= Alcamo =

Municipality in Sicily, Italy

Alcamo Àrcamu (Sicilian)
- Comune
- Comune di Alcamo
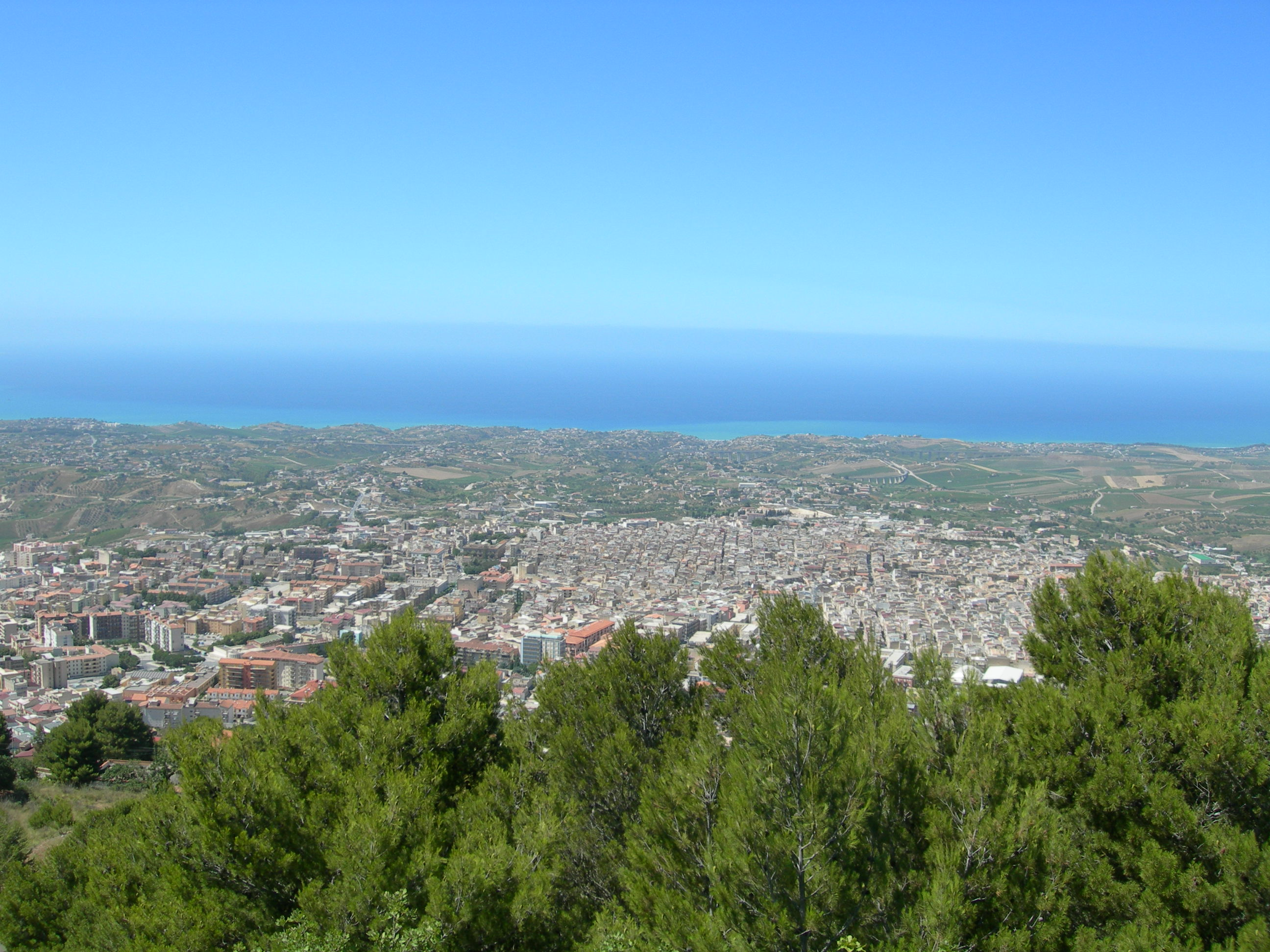

- Location within Italy Location within Sicily
- Coordinates: 37°58′40″N 12°57′50″E
- Country: Italy
- Region: Sicily
- Province: Trapani
- Frazioni: Alcamo Marina

Government
  - Mayor: Domenico Surdi

Area
  - Total: 130.79 km^{2} (50.50 sq mi)
- Elevation: 256 m (840 ft)

Population (31 October 2020)Data Table Istat
  - Total: 44,925
  - Density: 343.49/km^{2} (889.63/sq mi)
- Demonym(s): Alcamese (Italian); Àrcamisi (Sicilian)
- Time zone: UTC+1 (CET)
  - Summer (DST): UTC+2 (CEST)
- Postal code: 91011
- Dialing code: 0924
- Patron saint: Madonna of the Miracles
- Saint day: 21 June
- Website: Official website

Alcamo (Italian: [ˈalkamo]; Sicilian: Àrcamu [ˈaɾkamʊ]) is the fourth-largest town and municipality of the Province of Trapani, Sicily, with a population of 44,925 inhabitants. It is in the north-west of the island, on the border of the Metropolitan City of Palermo, about 50 kilometres (31 mi) from Palermo and Trapani.

The current municipality covers an area of 130.79 km^{2} (50.50 sq mi) and it is the second most densely populated in the province of Trapani, after Erice.

Alcamo is bounded by the Tyrrhenian Sea on the north, Balestrate and Partinico on the east, Camporeale on the south and Calatafimi-Segesta and Castellammare del Golfo on the west. Its main hamlet is Alcamo Marina, about 6 km (4 mi) from the town centre. Together with other municipalities is a participant in the Associazione Città del Vino, the Patto dei Sindaci movement, the Progetto Città dei Bambini project, Rete dei Comuni Solidali and Patto Territoriale Golfo di Castellammare.

== Geography ==
=== Territory ===
Alcamo is situated in the middle of the Gulf of Castellammare, at 258 m (846 ft) above sea level at the foot of Mount Bonifato, a calcareous complex 825 m (2,707 ft) high. At an altitude of 500 m (1,600 ft), near the "Funtanazza", there is the Nature Reserve of Monte Bonifato.

The territory of Alcamo includes Alcamo Marina, mainly used as a summer resort.

=== Climate ===
The climate is mild, with higher rainfall during winter than summer.

The average annual temperature is 16.9 °C (62.4 °F), with higher temperatures in August (24.8 °C (76.6 °F)) and lower ones in February (10.3 °C (50.5 °F)).

The average annual rainfall is 558 mm (22.0 in), driest in July (4 mm (0.16 in)) and wetter in December (83 mm (3.3 in)).

Climate data for Alcamo
Month	Jan	Feb	Mar	Apr	May	Jun	Jul	Aug	Sep	Oct	Nov	Dec	Year
Mean daily maximum °C (°F)	13.1 (55.6)	13.2 (55.8)	14.8 (58.6)	17.5 (63.5)	21.5 (70.7)	25.4 (77.7)	28.5 (83.3)	28.7 (83.7)	25.9 (78.6)	21.7 (71.1)	17.7 (63.9)	14.4 (57.9)	20.2 (68.4)
Daily mean °C (°F)	10.4 (50.7)	10.3 (50.5)	11.7 (53.1)	13.9 (57.0)	17.6 (63.7)	21.4 (70.5)	24.5 (76.1)	24.8 (76.6)	22.4 (72.3)	18.6 (65.5)	14.8 (58.6)	11.8 (53.2)	16.9 (62.3)
Mean daily minimum °C (°F)	7.7 (45.9)	7.5 (45.5)	8.6 (47.5)	10.4 (50.7)	13.8 (56.8)	17.5 (63.5)	20.5 (68.9)	21.0 (69.8)	18.9 (66.0)	15.5 (59.9)	12.0 (53.6)	9.2 (48.6)	13.6 (56.4)
Average precipitation mm (inches)	72 (2.8)	60 (2.4)	52 (2.0)	48 (1.9)	21 (0.8)	9 (0.4)	4 (0.2)	14 (0.6)	37 (1.5)	78 (3.1)	80 (3.1)	83 (3.3)	558 (22.1)
Source: Climate-Data.org

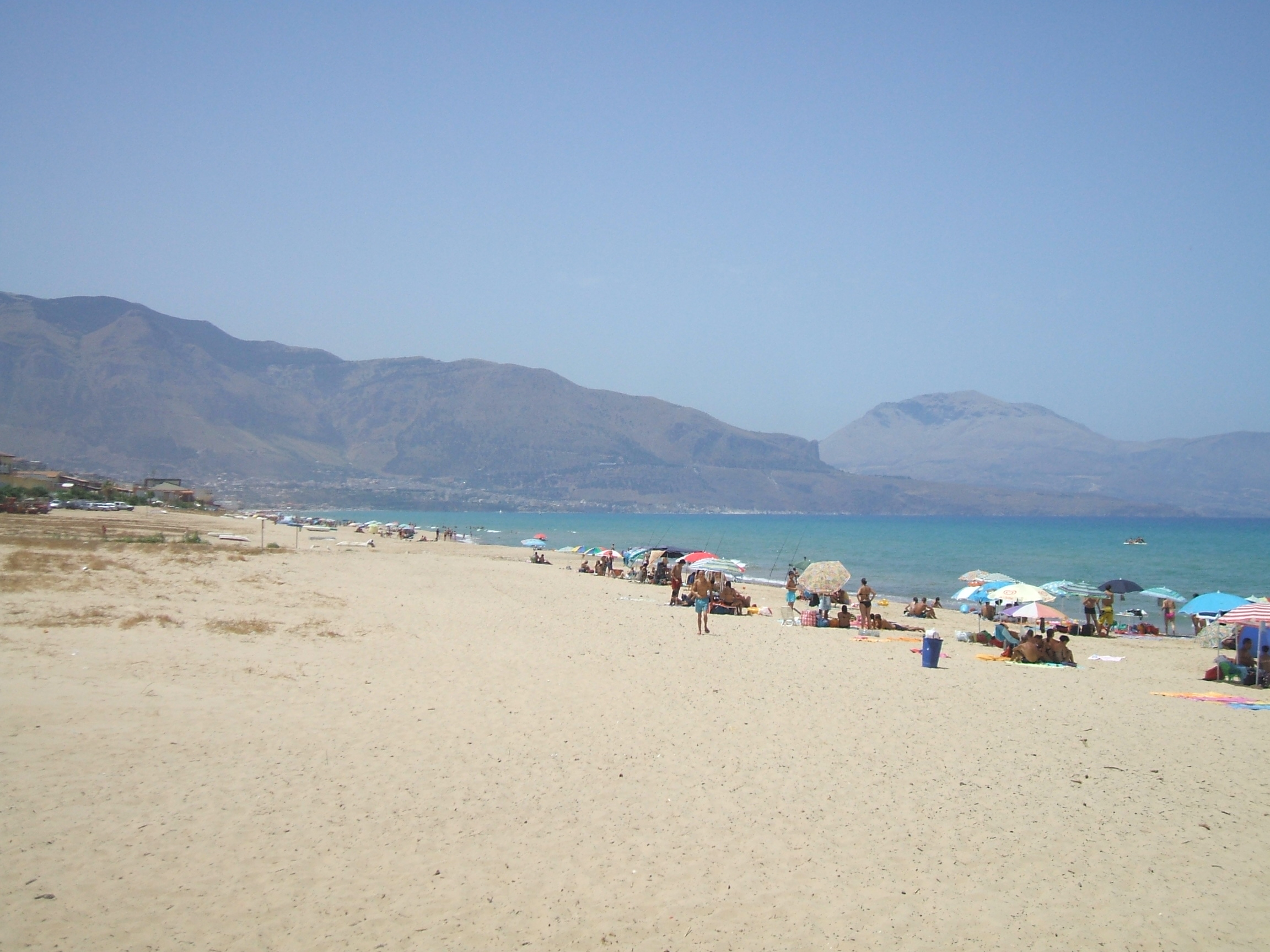
Part of the beach of Alcamo Marina in summer

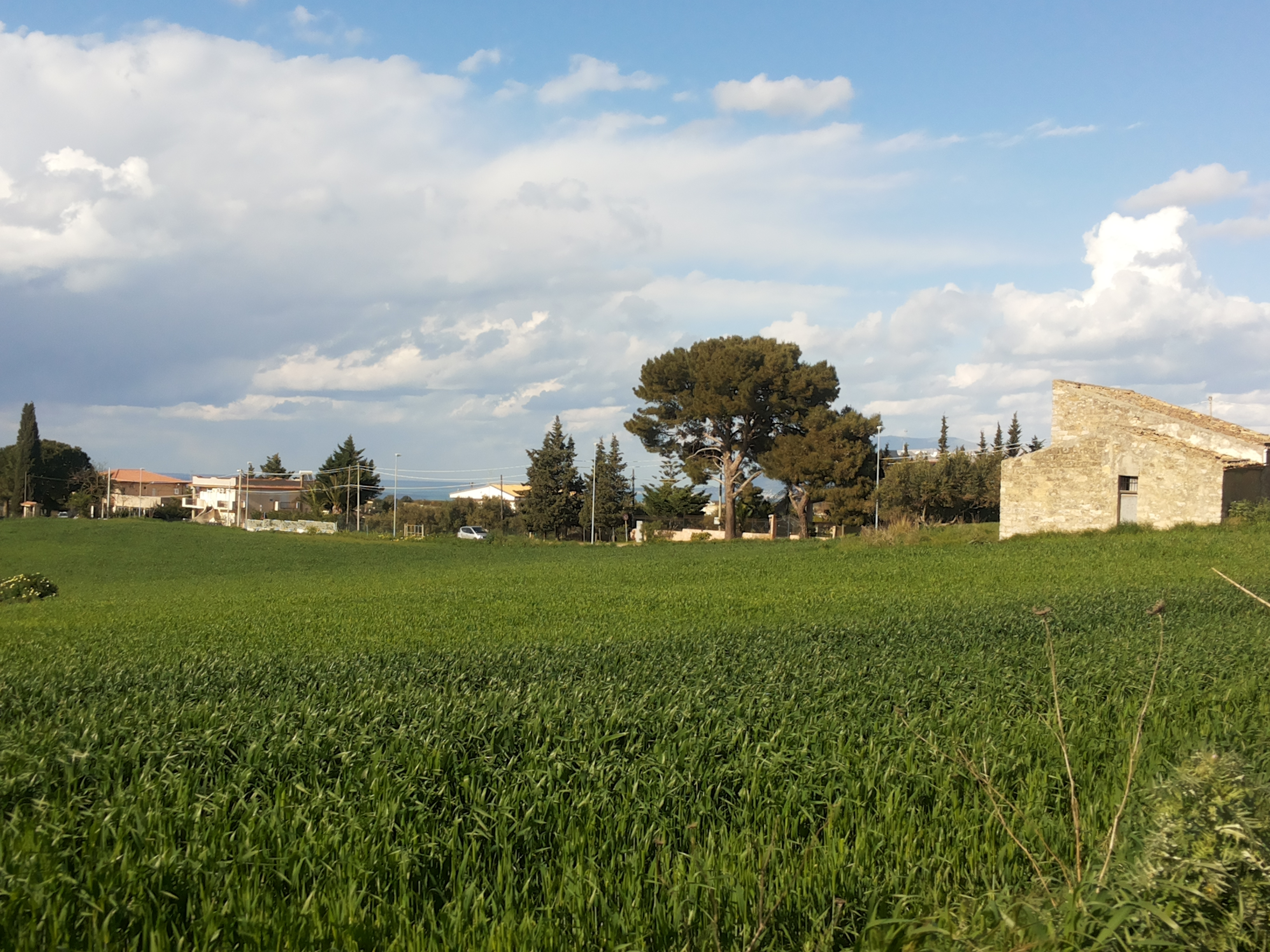
The countryside around Alcamo in spring

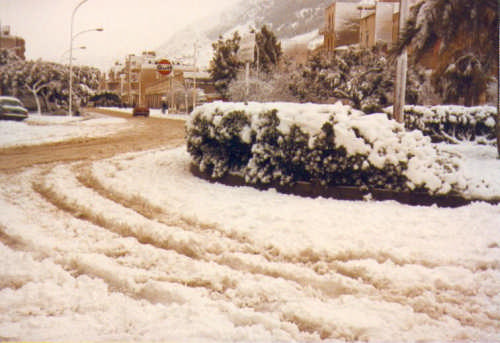
One of the rare snowfalls in Alcamo (8 January 1981)

Seismic classification
zone 2 (medium-high seismicity), Ordinance PCM 3274 (20 March 2003)
Climatic classification
zone B, 1140 degree day
Köppen climatic classification
CSa
Atmospheric diffusivity
low, Ibimet CNR 2002

== History ==
=== Etymology ===
There is no agreement about the etymology of the name "Alcamo". According to some scholars, it is derived from caccamu, a dialectal word referring to the plant Citrullus colocynthis.

=== Prehistory ===
Though there is little information about it, there are evidences that territory of Alcamo was inhabited in prehistoric times; in one of the most ancient sites, near Molinello (a country district), remains have been discovered dating back to the Mesolithic, approximately 9,000–6,000 BCE, with others dating back to the Neolithic found during the archaeological excavations by Paolo Orsi (1899) and the marquis Antonio De Gregorio (1917) near the river Fiume Freddo. An axe from the Neolithic is kept at the Museo archeologico regionale Paolo Orsi of Syracuse.

=== Longuro and Longarico ===
Lycophron describes an inhabited centre called "Longuro" on Mount Bonifato. Supposedly, this settlement was founded by Greeks who had escaped from the destruction of the town of Troy.

During the Roman period, the inhabitants of Longuro moved to Longaricum at the foot of the mountain to farm the surrounding area. The settlement's name appears in the Itinerary of Antoninus Pius (Italian: Itinerario di Antonino Pio) from in the 3rd century AD and coincides with the Latin name of Longuro.

It is possible that the two hillocks appearing on the gonfalon of Alcamo represent the two towns of Longaricum and Longuro.

=== Origins ===
The first document mentioning Alcamo dates from 1154, in a paper written by the Berber geographer Idrisi, who was given this task by Roger II of Sicily in order to get a collection of geographic maps. From over a mile away, the writer describes the position of Alcamo viewed from the Castle of Calatubo (visible today from the town) and defines it as a hamlet or a group of houses with rich soil and a flourishing market.

=== Medieval age ===
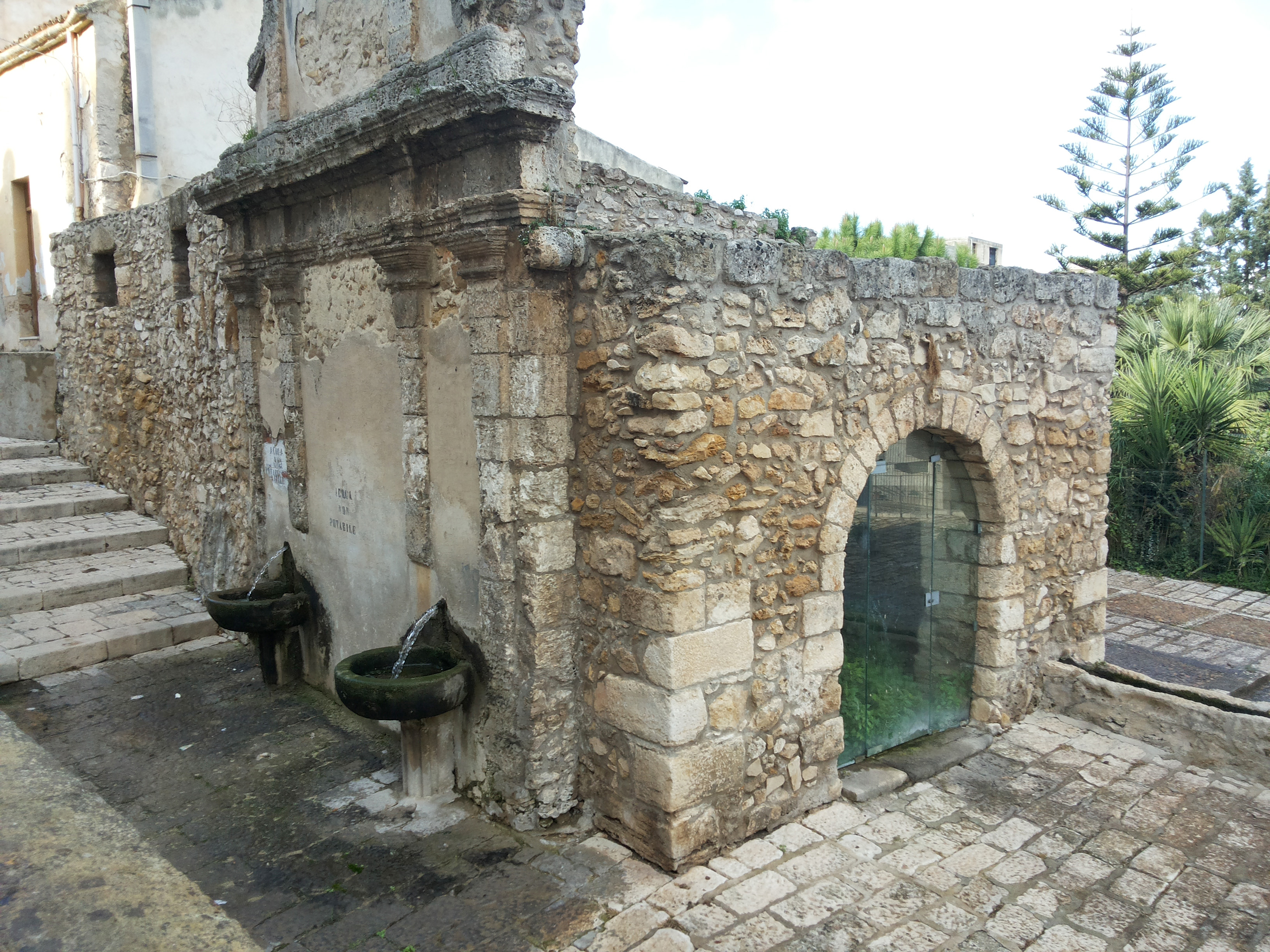
Arab fountain of Alcamo

Alcamo was divided into four hamlets named San Vito, San Leonardo, Sant'Ippolito and San Nicolò del Vauso. but a series of revolts between 1221 and 1243 led Frederick II to move most of the population to a colony at Lucera, while Christians from Bonifato came to inhabit the town. The poet Ciullo or Cielo d'Alcamo was born in the town.

In 1340 Raimondo Peralta acquired the feud and barony of Alcamo from Peter II of Aragon. The barony passed to his son Guglielmo Peralta Sclafani, called "Guglielmone", then to the Ventimiglia family (up to 1397), Giaimo de Prades (1407), the Cabrera family, the Speciale family, Pietro Balsamo prince of Roccafiorita (1618) and finally to Giuseppe Alvarez (1777).

By the 14th century Alcamo had several thousand inhabitants; many immigrated from different parts of Sicily and Italy (in particular Pisa, Amalfi, Bologna, Calabria and Liguria), and some also from Spain. During this period, Antonello da Messina moved to Alcamo for three years (around 1438–1441) to learn tanning techniques from the tanner master Guglielmo Adragna di Alcamo; the town was an important pole of development for commerce and handicraft. There was a considerable wheat and wine trade with nearby towns, with artisans such as bakers, blacksmiths, tanners and weavers. During this century Alcamo was an important centre for wheat storage and sorting. In the same period Giacomo Adragna transcribed Commentarii in Persium and Pietro d'Alcamo many works from the library of San Martino.

=== Modern age ===
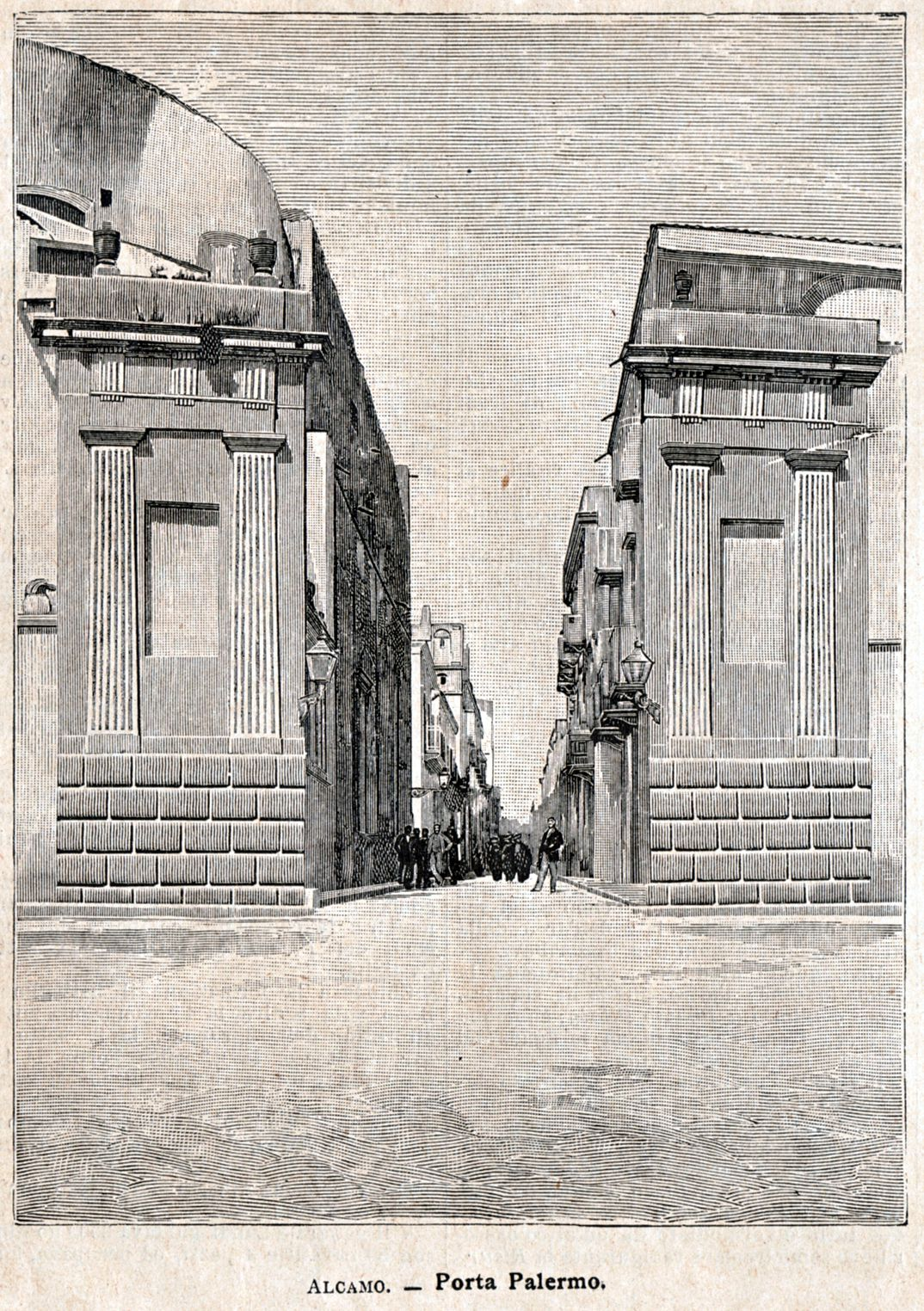
Porta Palermo in a print of 1900

Around 1500, Alcamo was under the jurisdiction of captain of justice Ferdinando Vega, who fought against raiding Turkish pirates. The town was surrounded by defensive embattled walls provided with four gates:

- Porta Palermo (afterwards called Porta Saccari), at the end of the present Via Rossotti;
- Porta Corleone, at the end of the present Via Commendatore Navarra;
- Porta di Gesù, opposite the church of Saint Mary of Jesus, next to the Franciscan friary;
- Porta Trapani (later called Porta del Collegio), at the beginning of Via Commendatore Navarra.

During this period, the town was divided into four-quarters, each one associated with the name of the main church in its area:

- San Giacomo de la Spada
- San Calogero
- San Francesco d'Assisi (or "Terra nuova")
- Maggiore Chiesa.

The division between these quarters coincided with the main streets of the town, now the present Corso 6 Aprile and Via Rossotti and its continuation Via dei Baroni Emanuele di San Giuseppe (called incorrectly "Via Barone di San Giuseppe").

In 1535, with the visit of the emperor Charles V coming back from Tunisia, the old Porta Trapani was closed and four gates were opened:

- new Porta Trapani, near the beginning of the present Corso 6 Aprile (that was called "Corso Imperiale");
- new Porta Palermo (initially called Porta San Francesco), at the end of today's Corso 6 Aprile;
- Porta Stella, at the corner between Via Stella and Piazza Ciullo; this name derives from the name of the Church of Our Lady of the Star (Italian: Madonna della Stella), near there;
- Porta Nuova, between the present Discesa al Santuario and Piazza della Libertà.

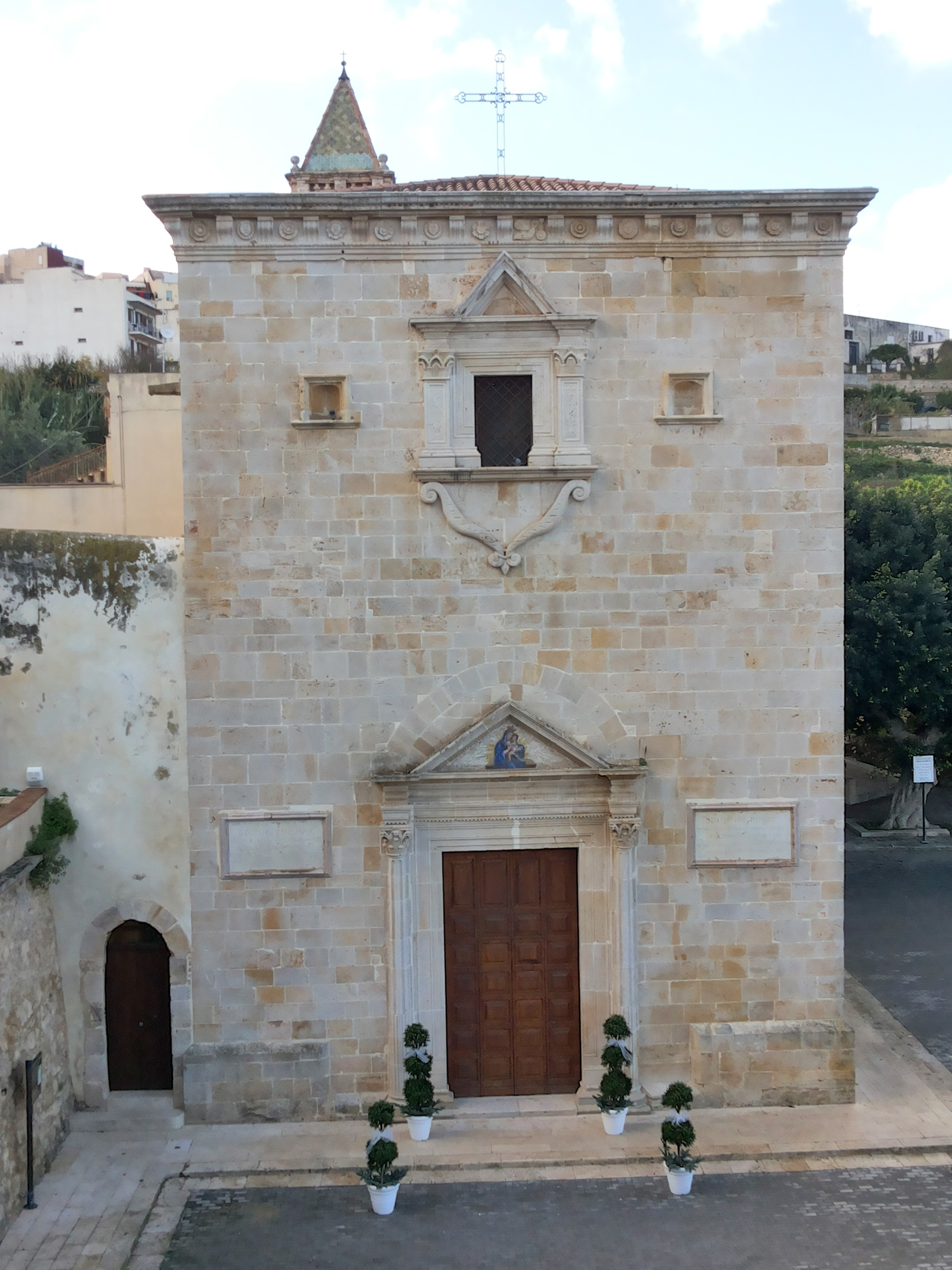
The Sanctuary of Madonna of Miracles

During the 16th century education in Alcamo improved with the construction of new schools and employment of expert teachers, in particular the poet and scholar Sebastiano Bagolino (1562–1604). In 1547 the Madonna appeared to some women of the people and an image of Madonna Fons Misericordiae was discovered and worshipped as "Our Lady of Miracles".

In the late 16th century, the population was decimated by an infectious disease. The victims were buried in the cemetery of Saint Ippolito.

In 1667 Mariano Ballo ordered the construction of a theatre, called "teatro Ferrigno". It was later demolished, but rebuilt during the 1960s when it was named "cine-teatro Euro", later "Teatro Cielo d'Alcamo".

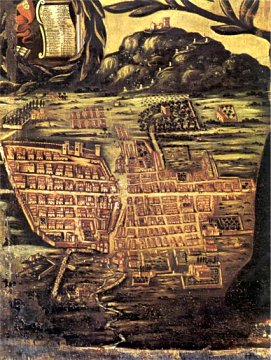
Map of Alcamo in a painting of 1725

During the 18th century, pestilence and popular rebellions occurred in Alcamo again. On the other hand, this age was important for art because of the construction of the Basilica of Our Lady of the Assumption (1699), designed by the architects Angelo Italia and Giuseppe Diamante. Its interior was decorated with 38 frescoes from 1736 to 1737 by the Flemish painter Guglielmo Borremans. In the same period the Church of Saint Olivia was renovated, Saint Paul and Bartholomew's Church was rebuilt (1689), and the Church of the Holy Crucifix (or saint Francis of Paola) was completed (1699) together with the monumental church of College some decades later in 1767.

Between 1752 and 1780, Ignazio De Blasi, an Alcamese nobleman, wrote the first book on Alcamo's history, entitled Discorso storico della opulenta città di Alcamo situata a piè del Monte Bonifato, e dell'antichissima città di Longarico ossia Lacarico, dopo detta Alcamo, su di esso monte.

The population of the town gradually recovered from earlier pestilence and had increased to 13,000 by 1798.

=== Contemporary age ===
In 1812, Alcamo's feudal status was abolished and the town became a direct royal possession.

The archpriests Stefano Triolo Galifi and Giuseppe Virgilio, together with the baron Felice Pastore, were members of the Sicilian Parliament as representatives of Alcamo. In 1820, during a revolt, there were different murders, sacks, releases of criminals from prison and a fire in the municipal archives. In 1829 many people died of cholera. In 1843 the construction of the present town hall started, on land owned by baron Felice Pastore.

On 6 April 1860, Stefano and Giuseppe Triolo let the Italian Tricolour wave on the town hall, creating groups of volunteers to help Giuseppe Garibaldi in the battle of Calatafimi, and from Alcamo some edicts on Victor Emmanuel II's behalf were issued. Some time later Francesco Crispi prepared the constitution for lands set free. To commemorate this event, Corso Imperiale was named Corso 6 Aprile.

In 1860, during the Unification of Italy the brothers Triolo of Sant'Anna and Giuseppe Coppola of Monte San Giuliano enlisted many citizens to fight with the "Garibaldians".

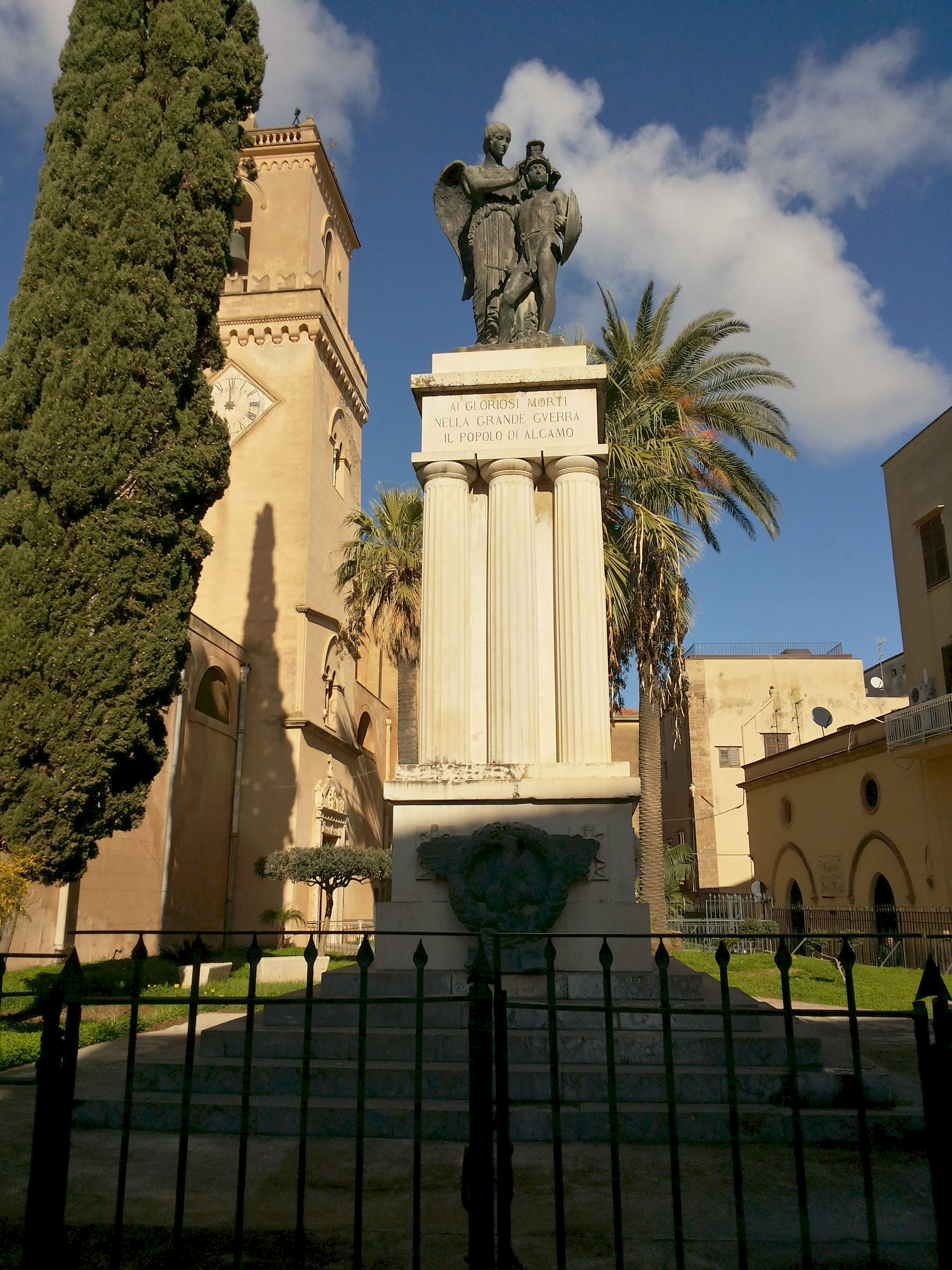
The Great War Memorial (1915–1918), inaugurated in 1929

At the end of the 19th century, in 1897, public lighting was inaugurated in Alcamo during the traditional feast of Our Lady of Miracles. Giuseppe Rizzo, a priest, founded the "Cassa Rurale e Artigiana Don Rizzo" bank in 1902.

At the beginning of the 20th century (1901–1911) the number of citizens in Alcamo diminished abruptly, partially because of the emigration of a recorded 36,718 Sicilians abroad, in particular to the United States, although an unreliable census makes the figure questionable. In the same period cultivation in the territory of Alcamo were affected by phylloxera, and two banks ("Cooperativa" and "Segestana") went bankrupt with subsequent economic difficulties for its citizens.

Events linked to the Mafia, such as the murder of Gaspare Cottone, a carter (1899) and the death of the 19-years-old Benedetto Guastella during an armed conflict with carabinieri in 1900 became notable. As the Mafia took power in the districts of Trapani and Alcamo, the commissary Cesare Mori intervened with a series of arrests and charges against the suspects and finally they arrested brothers Vincenzo and Michele Tedesco and Baldassare Adragna, considered the heads of the gangs in Trapani's territory.

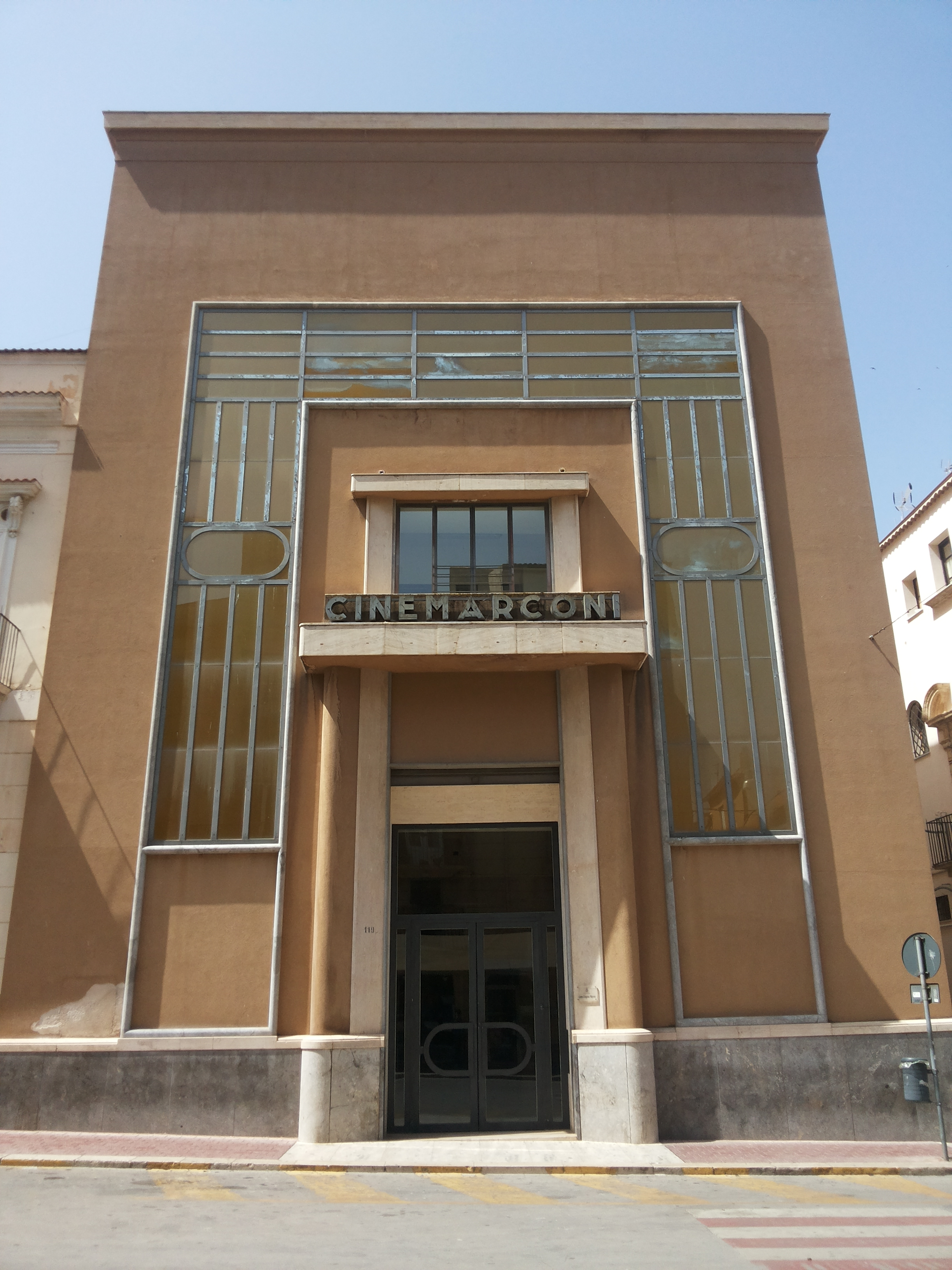
Façade of the cinema-theatre Marconi; today a congress centre

During the First World War, four hundred citizens from Alcamo died. The following period was characterized by poverty caused by monetary inflation and banditry. In 1918 about five hundred people died from Spanish flu. In the Second World War 213 citizens from Alcamo died or were lost. In 1927, Don Vincenzo Giovenco (1880–1954) operated and opened the first cinema in Alcamo, "Cinema Marconi". It closed less than ten years after opening after a fire.

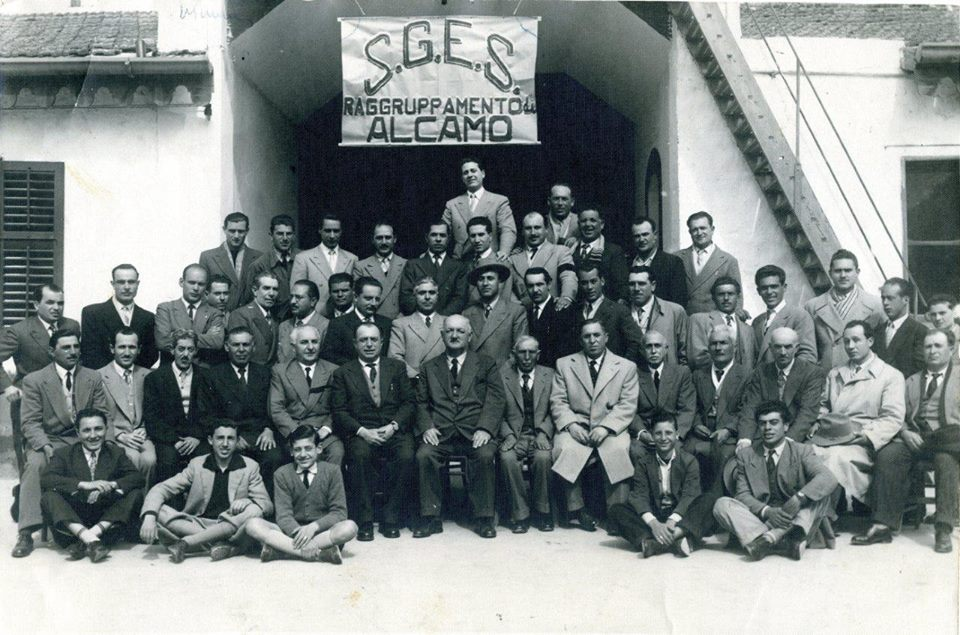
The entrance to Società Generale Elettrica della Sicilia (SGES) in Alcamo (in the '40s)

The foundation of Società Elettrotecnica Palermitana, whose name was changed to Società Generale Electrica della Sicilia (SGES), which installed an electric workroom in the district of Saint Augustine in Alcamo, dates back to the 1920s. Jobs inside the company were sought after: it was the only firm in Trapani Province which had a health insurance fund and granted holidays. The electric workroom existed until 1963, when it was acquired by Enel and demolished. During the years in which SGES operated, there was an improvement in the electric services in Alcamo's territory, contributed to by the construction of several artificial lakes.

During the Italian Fascism period, citizens asked the government to appoint Alcamo as the capital of the province (1930), but this request was denied.

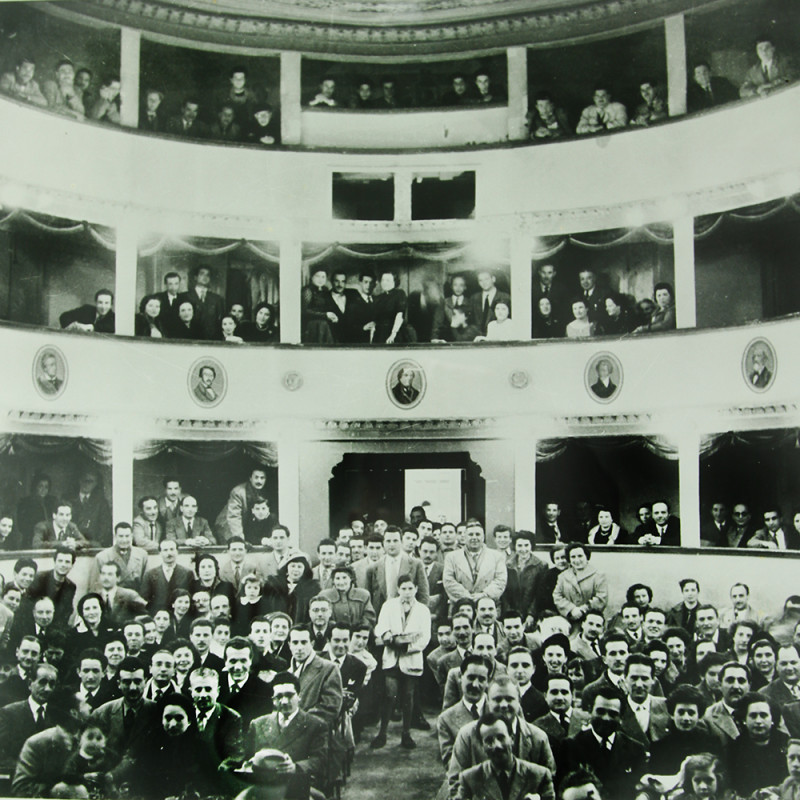
The old theatre Ferrigno in Alcamo (early 20th century)

On 19 August 1937, fascist leader Benito Mussolini visited the town, crossing Corso 6 Aprile in an open car and parading through the crowd of his supporters. The visit marked the inauguration of the railway line between Trapani and Alcamo, completed in the same year. Some weeks later, prince Umberto visited Alcamo.

On 21 July 1943 American troops entered Alcamo without any opposition, freeing the town from Italian Fascism. On 18 December 1944, with economic and social disruption, the citizens rose up, occupied the town hall and set its archives on fire. Since 1960 the town has expanded, particularly at the foot of Mount Bonifato, with the construction of Viale Europa, a main street in Alcamo.

From the end of the 1980s and into the 1990s there was a bloody Mafia war between the Greco clan (related to the Rimi family) and members of the emergent Mafia of Corleone, led by Vincenzo Milazzo in the territory of Alcamo. Vincenzo Milazzo received orders from Totò Riina to eliminate members of the old Mafia (in particular the member of the clan Greco) and put only his trusted men in command. The threat to the Greco clan from the Cosa Nostra led to five years of bloody conflict and resulted in tens of victims. The new Corleone Mafia prevailed, but came at the cost of a large number of its members' lives. During the same period of armed clashes between the Mafia families, the biggest heroin refinery in Sicily was discovered at contrada Virgini in Alcamo. (1985)

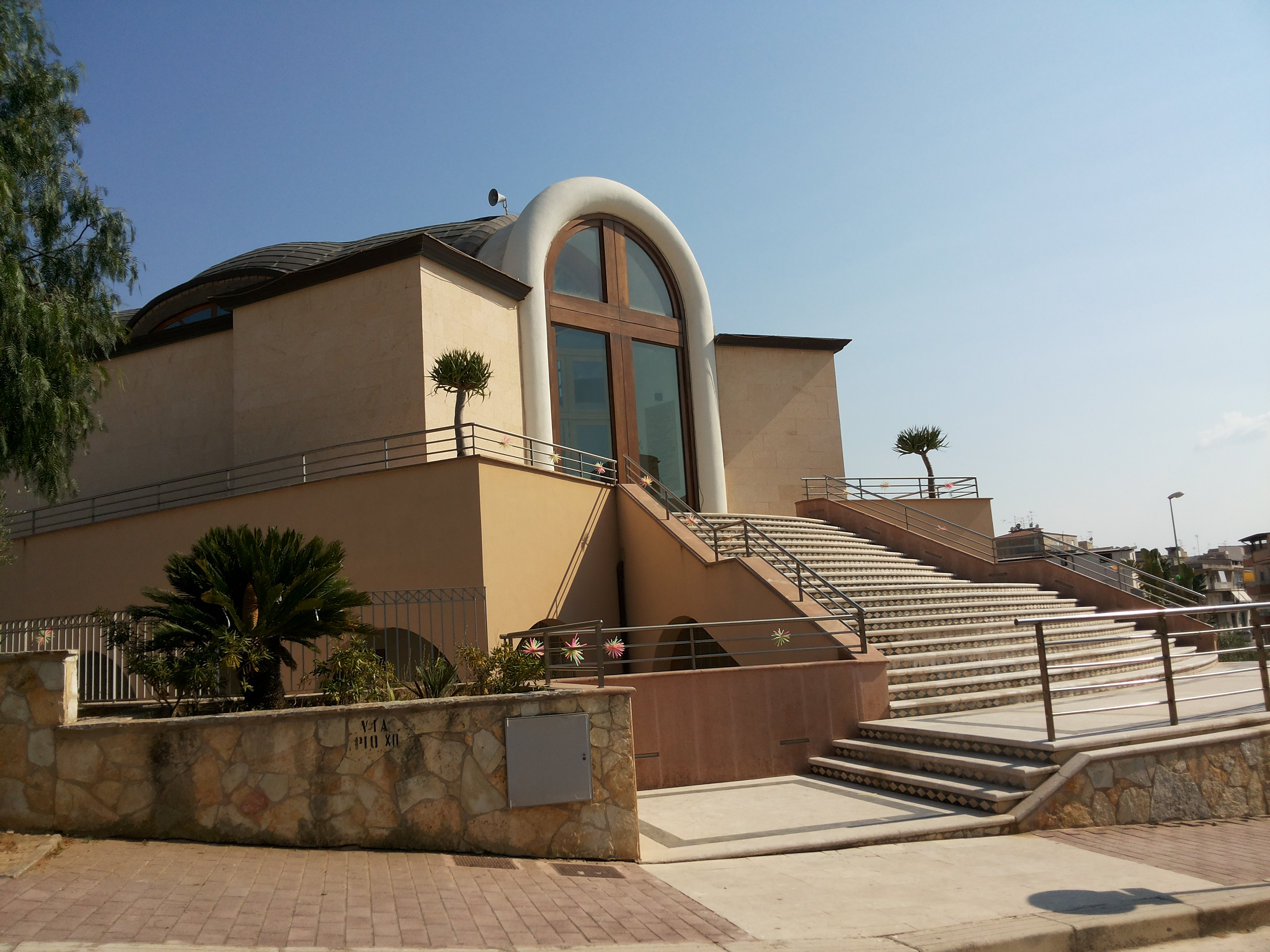
The Church of Jesus Christ the Redeemer

While the crimes of the Mafia went on and tens of people disappeared as victims of "lupara bianca", there was a religious revival which led to the birth of several Catholic associations such as Rinnovamento nello Spirito Santo, Neocatechumenal Way and the movement of Comunione e Liberazione. From the latter came the parish community of the Church of Jesus Christ the Redeemer, originating in the district of Sant'Anna (2006). This religious revival was followed by a new interest in the town's old traditions, mentioned in the works of Roberto Calia and Carlo Cataldo, historians from Alcamo. Carlo Cataldo has been recognized several times both for his historical works and for his dialectal poems of Alcamo's folklore.

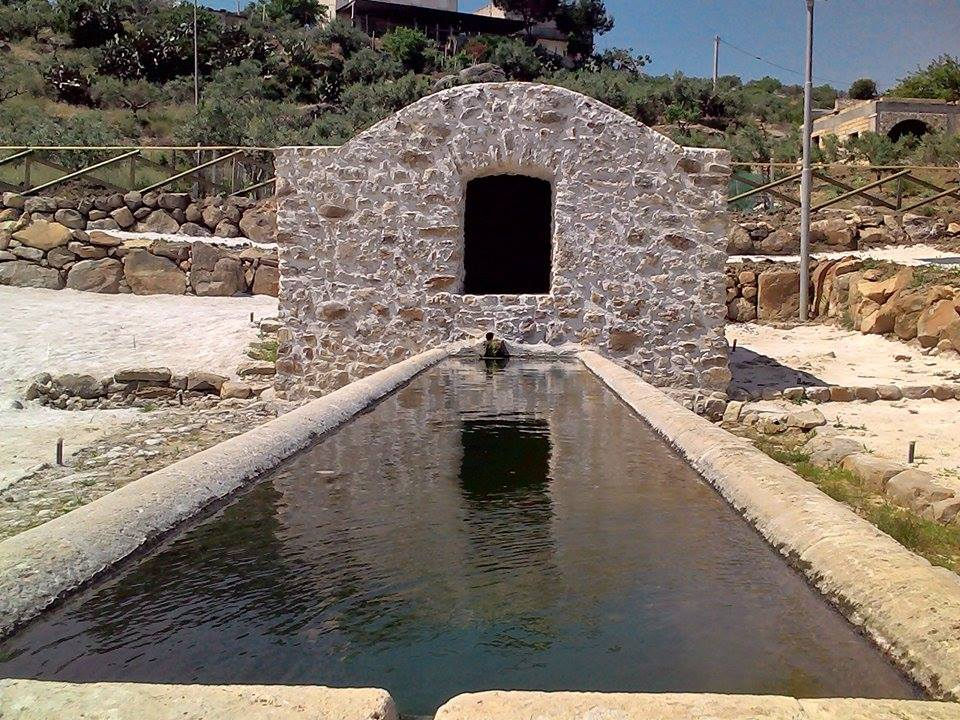
The Cuba delle rose after its restoration

In the 21st century there was a renovation of Alcamo's architecture, thanks to the restoration of some important historical buildings such as the Castle of the Counts of Modica, the Theatre Cielo d'Alcamo, the Cine-Theatre Marconi, the Ex Jesuits' College, the Cuba delle rose (in 2013), the church of College (in 2014), the façade of Badia Nuova (in 2014) and the old Arab fountain (in 2016). Restoration of the Castle of Calatubo is planned with the support of Fondo Ambiente Italiano; its chapel and the path leading to the castle have already been cleaned by the volunteers' association "Salviamo il Castello di Calatubo" (in 2015).

Urban areas have been improved, including the restoration of Piazza Ciullo by the architect Gae Aulenti (1996) and the construction of an underground car park in Piazza Bagolino, together with the creation of the near suburban park San Francesco. Environmentally, Alcamo has been considered an example to be followed for the results between 2010 and 2013 in the waste sorting (raccolta differenziata).

== Coat of arms ==
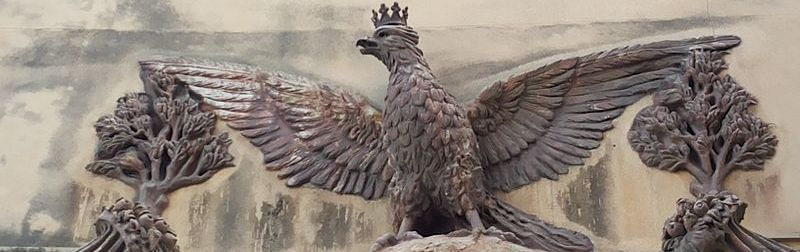
Stucco representing the coat of arms of Alcamo near Porta Palermo (1750)

The Coat of arms of Alcamo, used since the kingdom of Frederick II of Swabia, is a black flying Eagle, crowned by Gold in a Silver range, with three hills below and two Golden Oaks.

A sculpture of the coat of arms is on a side wall of the Church of Saint Francis of Assisi, near Porta Palermo.

== Main sights ==
=== Civil buildings ===
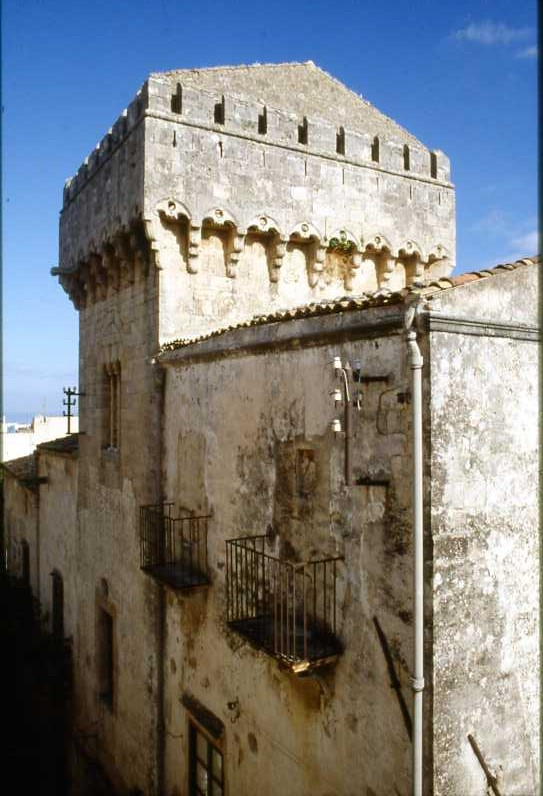
The tower of Palazzo De Ballis

There are several historical civil buildings in Alcamo:

- House of Ciullo d'Alcamo (3, Piazzetta Leopardi, near the Church of Saint Francis of Assisi)
- Palazzo De Ballis (Via Mariano de Ballis): built in the 16th century with a square tower with battlements, adorned with a round arch that contains two windows, a double lancet and one triple lancet; it was probably designed in 1490 by Tommaso and Pietro Oddo
- Ex Loggia Comunale (junction of Corso 6 Aprile and Via Barone di San Giuseppe): built in 1500 after the design of the architect Domenico Vitale, it has a base made with travertine and the upper part in calcarenite; it was used as a loggia from 1525 to 1767
- Palazzo Aversa (48, Via Porta Stella): it has balconies in carved stone and the coat of arms, with a red lion looking at a red comet
- Palazzo D'Angelo (between Corso 6 Aprile and Via Fratelli sant'Anna): built in 1768
- Palazzo D'Angelo (12, Piazza Ciullo): 19th century
- Palazzo De Stefani (Via Commendatore Navarra, opposite Badia Nuova): in Liberty style, built in the 19th century
- Palazzo Diana (or Termine) (junction of Via Ignazio de Blasi and Corso 6 Aprile): two small columns at the corner, one double lancet window in Via De Blasi, with the Diana's coat of arms and a cornice similar to Gothic style above the door
- Palazzo Di Gregorio (Via Dante): built around the 17th century
- Palazzo Ferrando-Mistretta (between Via Diaz and Via Sant'Oliva)
- Palazzo Ferrara (junction of Via Francesco Crispi and Via Ruggero Settimo): in classical style, built in 1909
- Palazzo Fraccia (Via 11 Febbraio): Baroque style, built in 1700 by the baron Agostino Fraccia
- Palazzo Guarrasi (15, Via 15 Maggio): built in the early 18th century
- Palazzo Mistretta Galati (between Piazza Bagolino and Corso 6 Aprile): earlier palazzo Fracciain Liberty style
- Palazzo Morfino (17, Via Giuseppe Fazio): built in the 18th century
- Palazzo Palmerini (junction of Via Madonna dell'Alto and Via Buonarroti)
- Palazzo Pastore (Corso 6 Aprile, near Piazza Ciullo): built at the end of the 18th century in neoclassic style; some elements of the façade are similar to those of Basilica and Palazzo Di Gregorio in Via Dante
- Palazzo Patti (24, Piazza Ciullo): built in the 18th century
- Palazzo Peria (102, Corso 6 Aprile, opposite Centro Congressi Marconi): built in 1700, it has two floors, restored with the system Livigny; in 1806 it was the seat of the municipality
- Palazzo Pia Opera Pastore, designed by the architect Giovan Battista Palazzotto in 1872
- Palazzo Polizzi (between Corso 6 Aprile and Via Don Rizzo)
- Palazzo Quattrocchi (47, Via 15 Maggio): built in the 18th century
- Palazzo Rocca (Corso 6 Aprile): built in 1629; garden
- Palazzo Rossotti-Chiarelli (in Via Rossotti): built in the 18th century in baroque style; it has an artistic main door and some balconies with iron railings
- Palazzo Speciale (51, Corso 6 Aprile, at the corner with Via Mariano de Ballis): built at the end of the 18th century; its balconies have wrought iron railings.
- Palazzo Triolo (between Corso 6 Aprile and Via Fratelli Sant'Anna): built at the end of the 18th century, it belonged to the barons of Sant'Anna
- Palazzo Velez (Via Buonarroti, behind the Basilica of Our Lady of the Assumption): built between 1600 and 1700, it has an internal garden
- Palazzo Virgilio (between Corso 6 Aprile and Via Stefano Polizzi): built at the end of the 18th century
- Town Hall (Piazza Ciullo): built in 1843 in Neoclassic style
- Villa Luisa (between Via Madonna Alto Mare, Via Rossotti and Via Federico II): built in 1903 in Liberty style with a Moorish trend, after a project of the architect Francesco Naselli

=== Religious buildings ===
==== 14th century ====
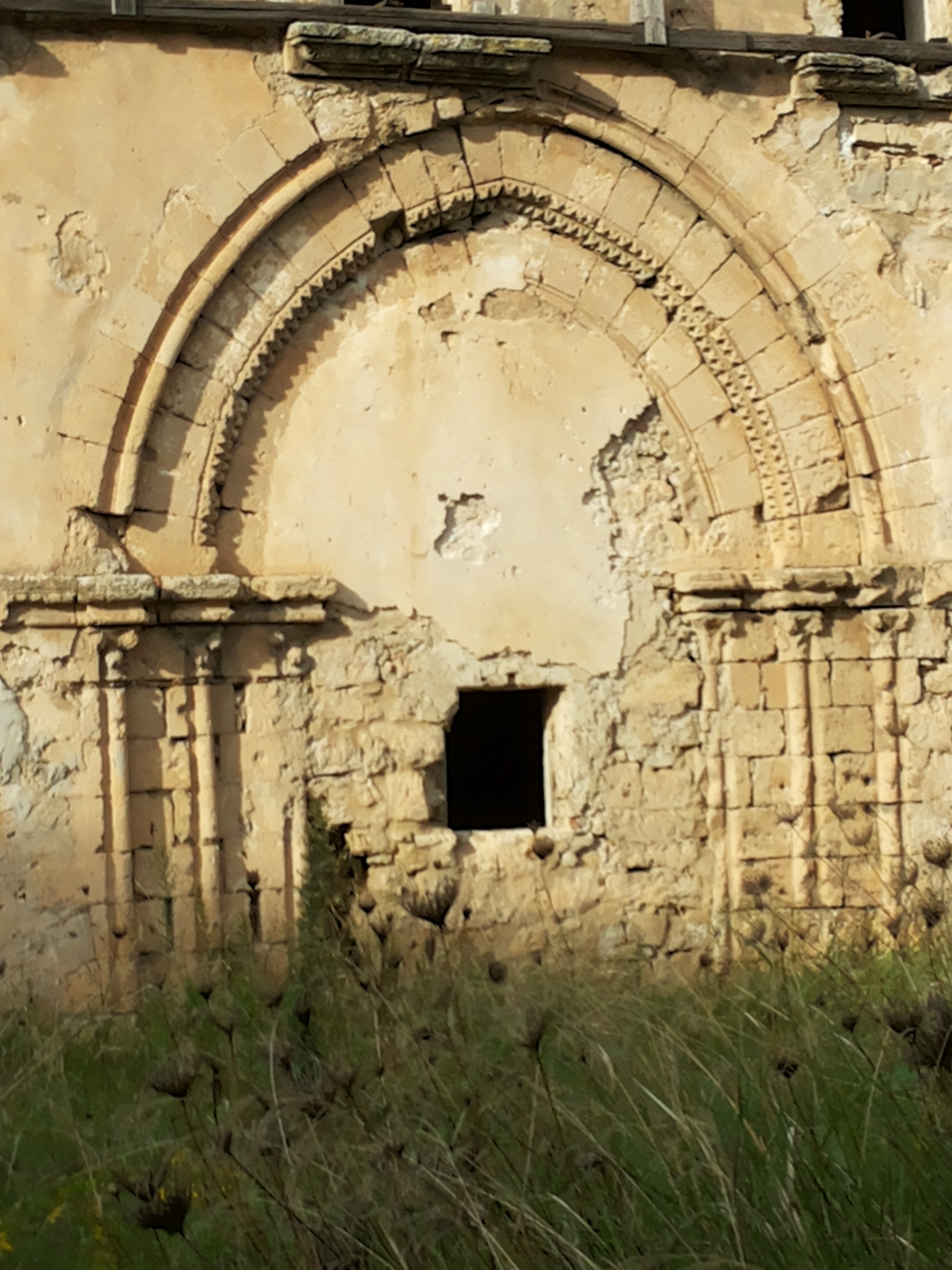
The portal of the Church of Our Lady of the Star

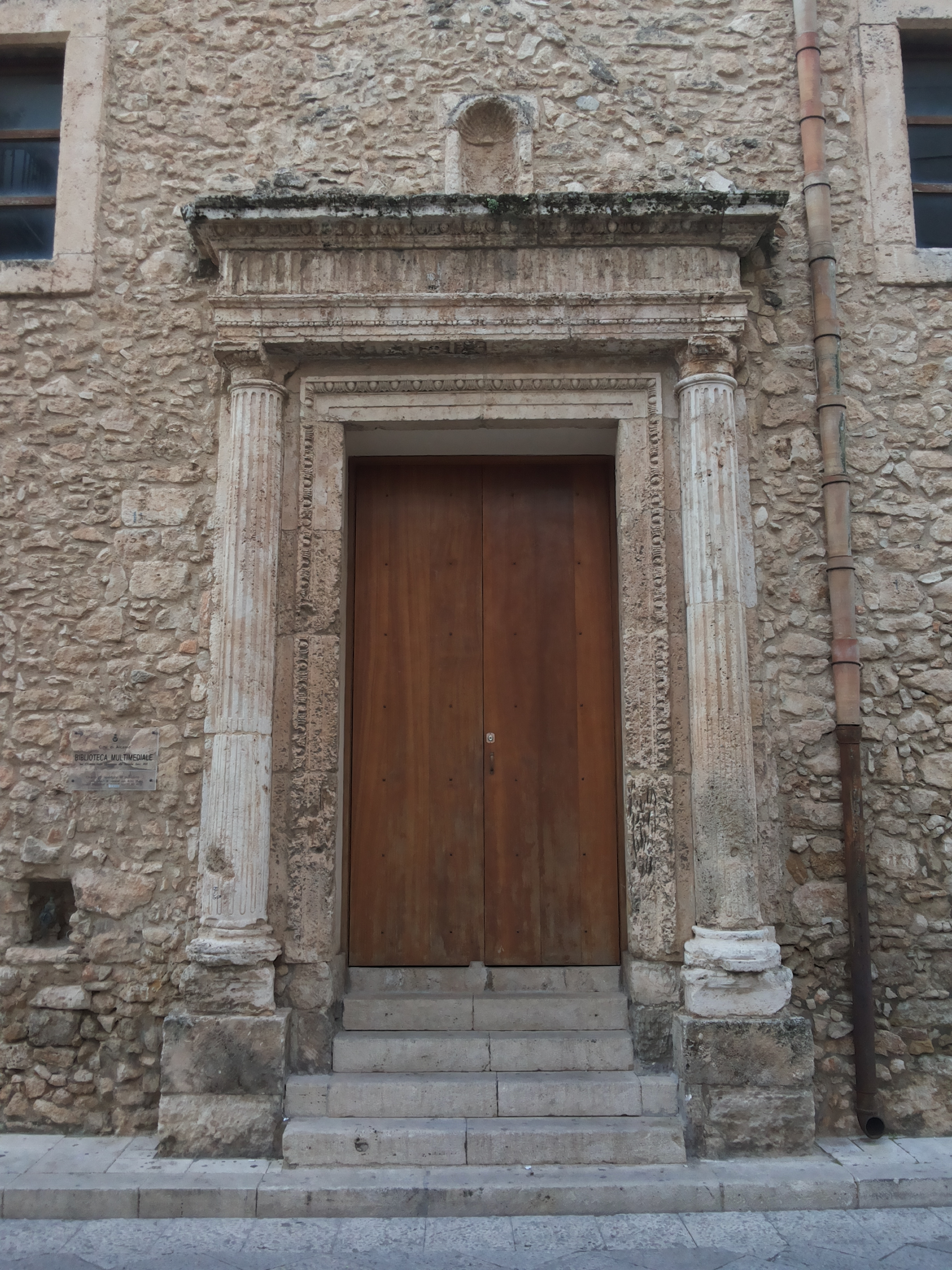
The portal of the Ex Church of Saint James of the Sword

- The Church of our Lady of the Star (Chiesa di Santa Maria della Stella): now abandoned, it was the first Mother Church of Alcamo since 1313. It was located in the old district of San Vito and inside it there was the painting of Our Lady of Honey (Madonna del Miele) dated 1300 and believed to be the oldest in Alcamo; this was later moved into the Saints Paul and Bartholomew's Church.
- Ex Church of Saint James of the Sword (Ex Chiesa di San Giacomo de Spada): built before 1529, it was enlarged between 1625 and 1636.

==== 15th century ====
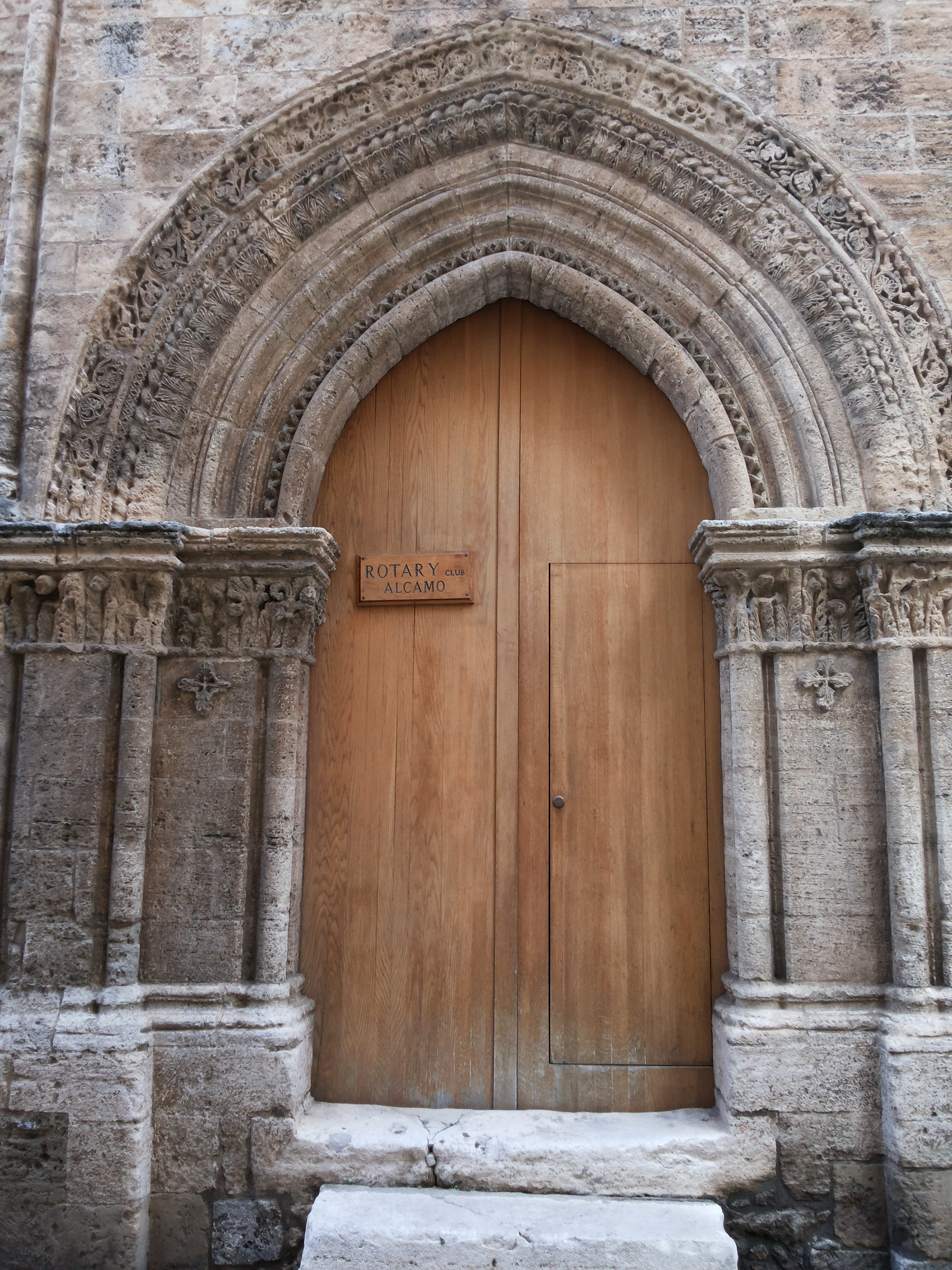
Portal of the Church of Saint Thomas

- Church of Saint Thomas (Chiesa di San Tommaso): the date of its construction is uncertain, probably the first half of the 15th century. It is faced by a great portal with geometrical decorations.
- Church of Saint Mary of Jesus (Chiesa di Santa Maria di Gesù): built in the 15th century and enlarged in 1762. It holds the body of the Blessed Arcangelo Placenza from Calatafimi.
- Ex Church of Ex Church of Our Lady of Rescue (Saint Maria del Soccorso): built in the 15th century.
- Church of Saint Vito (Chiesa di San Vito): it gave the name to the ancient district of San Vito and to the street where it is located. It was built before 1492 and, according to Ignazio de Blasi (a historian from Alcamo), it was founded by a member of the Confraternity of the Annunciation, together with a hospital for poor people next to it. It was restored in 1922 and again some decades ago; there is nothing old in it and today is used by Eastern Orthodox Church Christians.
- Church of the Holy Spirit: quoted in a deed dated 1491, as it is affirmed by the historian Ignazio De Blasi. It is located next to the first cemetery, on the North side.

==== 16th century ====
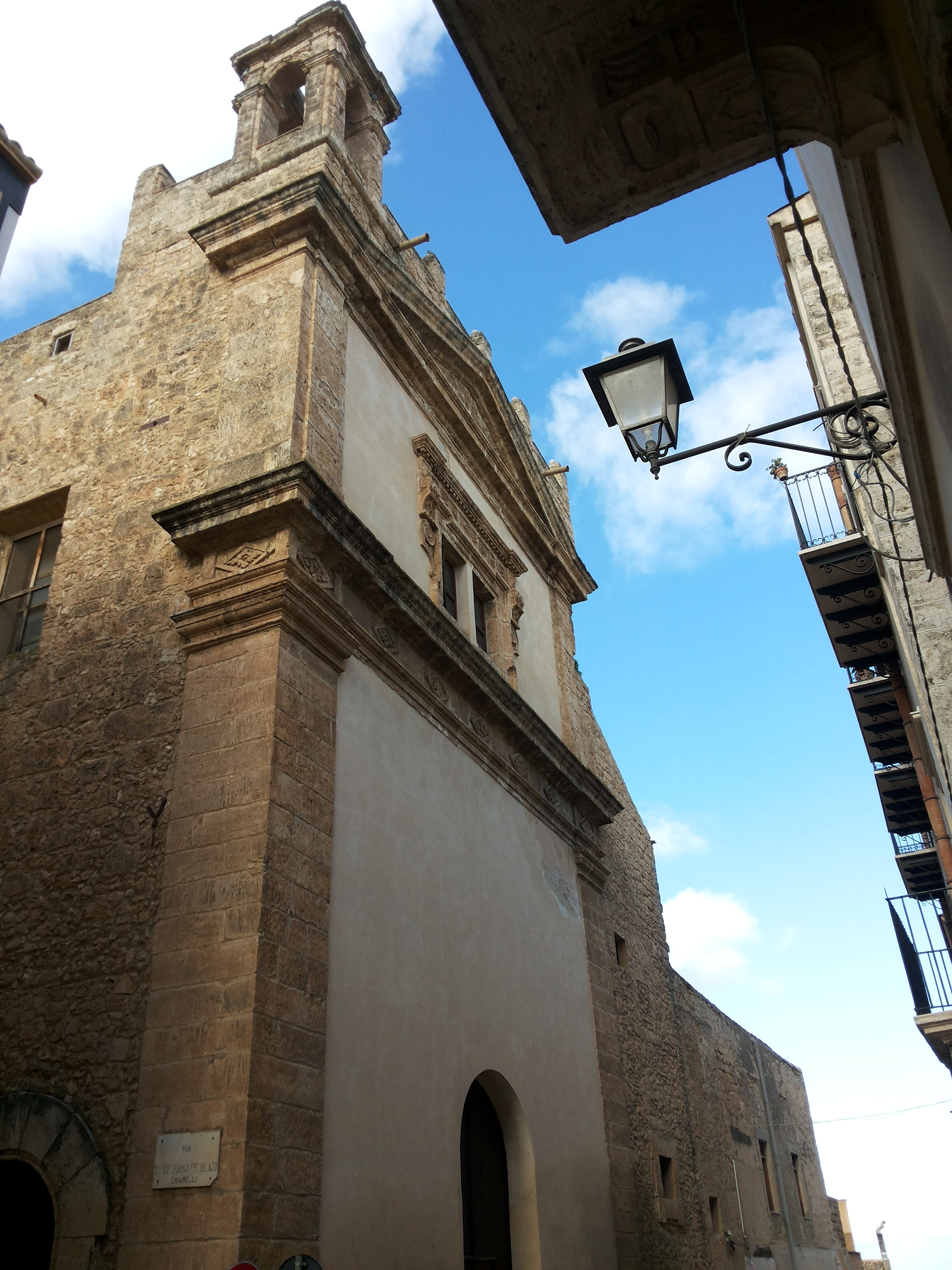
The façade of Church of the Holy Saviour

- Church of the Holy Saviour (Chiesa del Santissimo Salvatore or "Badia Grande"): built in the 14th century baroque style and rebuilt around the middle of the 15th century and again between 1690 and 1697. Inside there are pictures by Novelli dated to the mid-17th century.
- Church of Saint Olivia (Chiesa di Sant'Oliva): built in 1533 and renovated in 1724. Inside there is a picture by Pietro Novelli on the main altar (Sacrificio della Messa dated 1639) and works by the Gagini.
- Sanctuary of Madonna of Miracles (Santuario di Maria Santissima dei Miracoli): built in 1547
- Church of the Holy Crucifix (or Saint Francis of Paola) (Chiesa del Santissimo Crocifisso): built in 1550, and now the parish of Saint Francis of Paola
- Church of the Annunciation (Chiesa dell'Annunziata o del Carmine): built in the 14th century, and rebuilt in 16th and 17th centuries; collapsed in 1866
- ex Church of Saint Nicholas from Bari (Ex Chiesa di San Nicolò di Bari): built in 1430, demolished and rebuilt in 1558
- Church of Saint Augustine: built 1589

==== 17th century ====
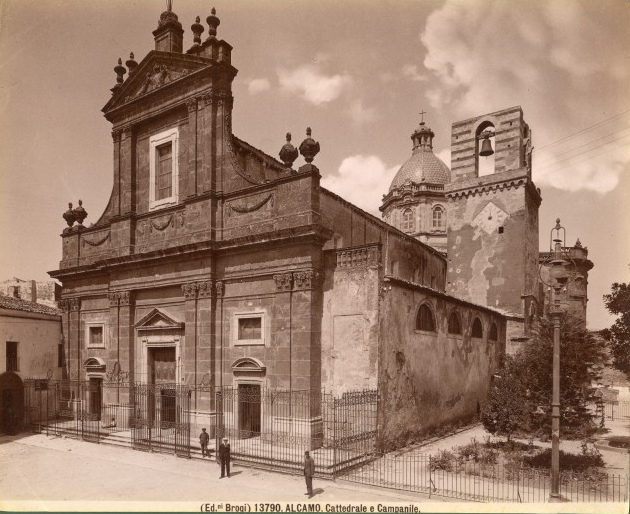
The façade of Basilica di Santa Maria Assunta in a photo of the early years of the 20th century

- Basilica of Our Lady of the Assumption was built during the 14th century and rebuilt in 1669; the present façade was added in 1786; the portal and the bell tower are the only remains of the original 14th century church. It is in the centre of the town, near Piazza Ciullo. The interior is tripartite and contains frescoes by Guglielmo Borremans. In the apse and side chapels there are works by Antonello Gagini, called "Madonna with the Saints Philip and James", Crucifix and Transit of the Virgin; there are also other works made by his apprentices. In a chapel there is The Holy Thorn. In 2010 the Sacred Art Museum was opened: it contains many works from other churches. In the first chapel, there is a modern architectural work dedicated to Don Rizzo (founder of the homonymous bank), designed by the architect Paolo Portoghesi.
- Church of Saint Francis from Assisi (Chiesa di San Francesco d'Assisi): built 1224–1226, demolished and rebuilt between 1608 and 1648. Inside it there is a marble ancon, probably by Domenico Gagini, and two sculptures reproducing the Maddalena and Saint Mark, both ascribed to Antonello Gagini.
- Church of Saints Paul and Bartholomew (Chiesa dei Santissimi Paolo e Bartolomeo): built between 1615 and 1689, it has characteristic baroque features and holds "Madonna del Miele" (made about the year 1300).
- Church of Our Lady of Graces (Santa Maria delle Grazie): built in 1619 and enlarged between 1626 and 1636
- Church of Saint Anne (Chiesa di Sant'Anna): built 1630–1634
- Church of Saint Peter (Ex Chiesa di San Pietro): 19, Via Barone di san Giuseppe. It was built in 1367 and reconstructed in 1645–1649, then enlarged in 1742 after a design by Giovanni Biagio Amico, an architect. The artistic portal (1649) is on the main door. The roof collapsed during the 1968 Belice earthquake; it was rebuilt 20 years later, costing 300 millions lira from Genio Civile.
- Church of the Saint Guardian Angel or Sheltered People (Chiesa del S.Angelo Custode or Chiesa delle Riparate): built 1647
- Church of the Holy Family: built in the 16th century in Piazza Ciullo
- ex Collegio dei Gesuiti (Ex Collegio dei Gesuiti): built in the 17th century; in the 18th century an arcade was added
- Church of the College of Jesuits or Church of Jesus (Chiesa del Collegio dei Gesuiti or Chiesa del Gesù ): built between 1684 and 1767
- Church of Our Lady with a Chain (Chiesa Maria della Catena): built in 1661, it hosts a portrait of Our Lady with a Chain, ascribed to Giuseppe Renda (18th century)
- Ex Church of Saint Catherine of Monte di Pietà (Ex Chiesa di Santa Caterina del Monte di Pietà): in Corso 6 Aprile, at the corner of Via Barone di San Giuseppe. Its façade, with a simple portal, was made in 1608 and the painting of Saint Catherine of Alexandria (1621), by Giuseppe Carrera or Giacomo Lo Verde, is now kept at the Sacred Art Museum.

==== 18th century ====
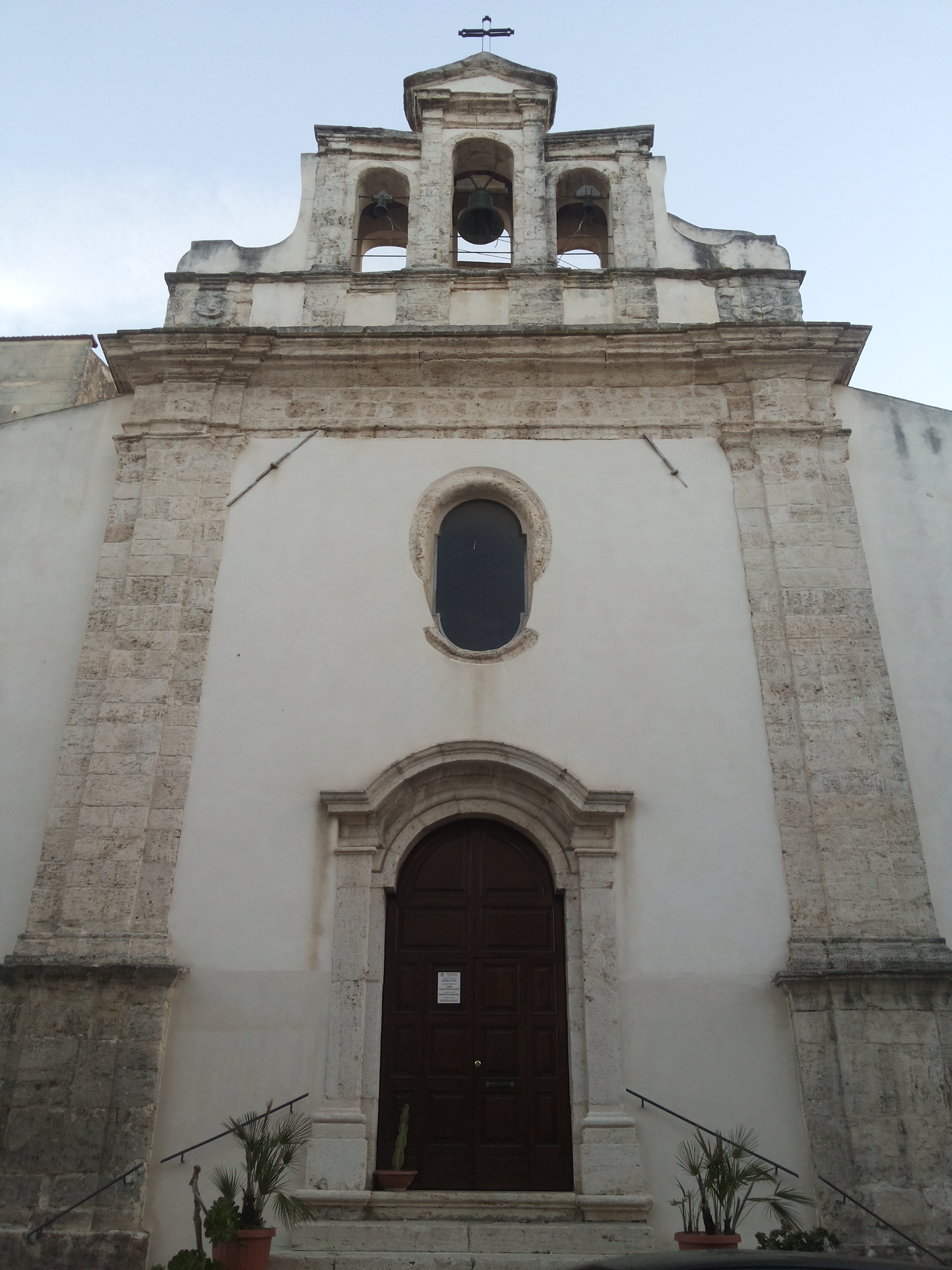
The façade of the Church of the Most Holy Trinity, Alcamo

- Saints Cosma and Damiano's Church (Chiesa dei Santi Cosma e Damiano or Santa Chiara): built in 1500 and rebuilt between 1721 and 1725. It has a baroque style and inside it there are two sculptures by Serpotta.
- Badia Nuova (Monastero di San Francesco di Paola), not to be confused with the homonymous Church, was built in 1531, demolished in 1699 and rebuilt in the first half of the 18th century. There is a picture by Pietro Novelli and some allegorical representations by Giacomo Serpotta.
- Church of the Most Holy Trinity (Chiesa della Santissima Trinità): built 1746–1757
- Ex Church of Ecce Homo (Ex Chiesa dell'Ecce Homo): built 1750
- Church of Our Lady of the Rosary (Chiesa di Santa Maria del Rosario): built in 1660 and reconstructed in 1761

==== 20th–21st centuries ====
- Sanctuary of Most Holy Mary of the Height (Santuario di Maria Santissima dell'Alto): built in 929 and reconstructed in the 20th century
- Sanctuary of Maria Santissima del Fiume, on Strada Statale 113, just after Autostrada A29 junction Alcamo Ovest. Built in the 1920s, it is frequented by believers in May.
- The small Church of the Most Holy Saviour: already known in 1379, last restored in 1942; its façade was rebuilt in gothic style
- The small Church of Madonna del Riposo: built in 1656 and restored in 1939; located at the end of the homonymous street
- Church of Saint Joseph the Worker (Chiesa di San Giuseppe Lavoratore): built in 1947
- Church of the Holy Souls in Purgatory (Chiesa delle Anime Sante del Purgatorio): built in 1813, demolished and rebuilt in 1958
- Church of the Holy Heart (Chiesa del Sacro Cuore): built in 1967
- Church of Jesus Christ the Redeemer (Chiesa Gesù Cristo Redentore): built in 2006
- Church of Madonna of the Good Thief

=== Military buildings ===
Military buildings in Alcamo include:

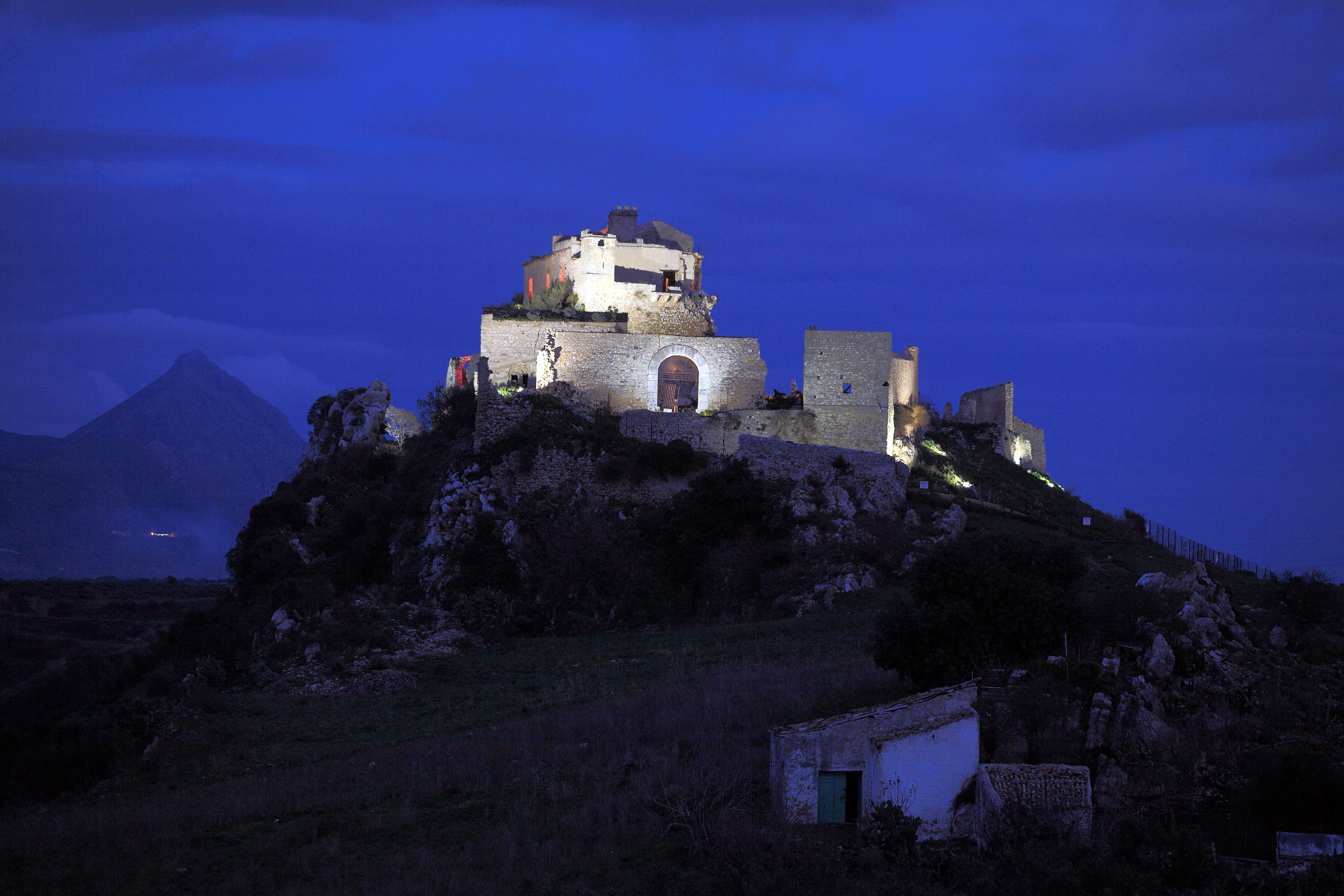
The Calatubo Castle by night

- The Castle of the Counts of Modica (or "Castle of Alcamo"): probably built in the 14th or 15th century by the Peralta family and then completed by the feudatories Enrico and Federico Chiaromonte. In 1535 the emperor Charles V lodged there. It was a possession of the Cabreras and then of the Counts of Modica, until 1812. Later, during the Reign of Italy and until 1960, it was used as a prison. It has a rhomboidal shape, with four towers: two quadrangular at the corners and the other two are connected by curtains and are cylindrical. In each tower there were a torture room for prisoners, rooms for sentinels and for passing guest sovereigns. One of the particular characteristics of the castle is given by the thick walls which bound it and that in old times defended it from the enemies' attacks extremely well.
- Castle of Ventimiglia: situated on the top of Mount Bonifato. It is a medieval castle and today there are only some parts of the walls, the primary tower and the dungeons. It took the name from Enrico Ventimiglia, who declared he had built it just for defence, though according to some interpretations, it would date back to a previous period.
- The Calatubo Castle, outside the town but inside its territory and on the road leading to Palermo, is a fortress built in the early Middle Ages. The homonymous village of Calatubo stood nearby and its commerce was based on the exportation of cereals and millstones. In the same place there is an old necropolis dating back to the 6th century BC.
- The watchtower located in the town centre, in Corso 6 Aprile, next to the Church of Saint Maria del Soccorso, opposite the Mother Church. Its construction dates back to 980 A.D. and is the oldest architectural work existing in Alcamo, in perfect preservation conditions. Later the tower was bought by the diocese (1400) and used as a bell tower for the near Mother Church which, at the time, didn't have one. They put then two bells on its top, the remaining one is on the west, while the smaller one on the north side was dismounted at about 1950 for safety reasons. Inside the building you can see a stone winding staircase with 84 steps, 50 of them are original ones.

=== Archaeological sites ===
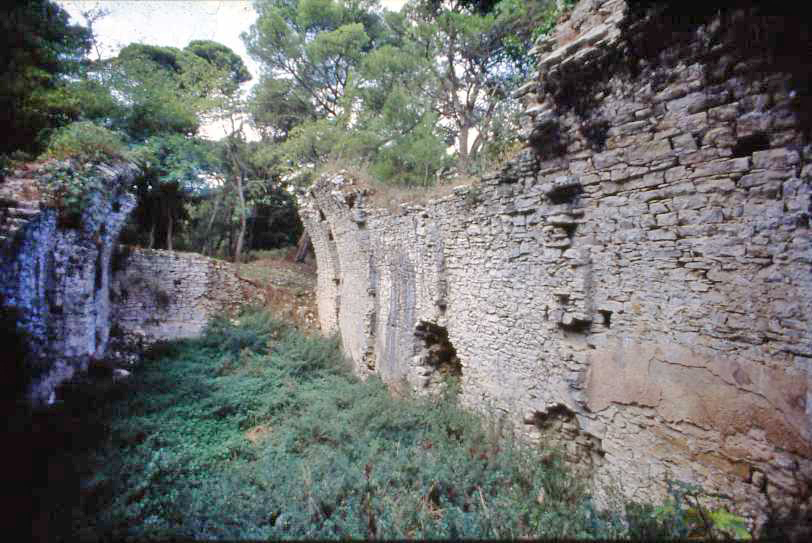
The interior of Funtanazza, on Mount Bonifato

In the territory of Alcamo there are several and interesting archaeological sites:

- The ruins on Mount Bonifato include Funtanazza (probably used as a water reservoir), Porta Regina, the Castle of Ventimiglia, the snowfields and the remains of the ancient village of Bonifato;
- The ruins in the area of Calatubo, which include the Castle of Calatubo, the necropolis near it and the ruins of the surrounding village.
- The Cuba delle Rose, an ancien Arab cistern near the Castle of Calatubo
- The ruins of the ancient Roman furnaces at Alcamo Marina, used to produce tiles and bricks;
- The archaeological site in Contrada Mulinello, where they have discovered finds dating back to the Mesolithic period;
- The area near Fiume Freddo where archaeological finds from the Neolithic have been found.
- The Geosite Travertino della Cava Cappuccini dating back to Pleistocene: they discovered here the fossilized shell of a turtle, Geochelone sp, the Skeleton of a dwarf elephant, dating back to 260,000 years ago, and two specimens of the giant edible dormouse, red deer, and wild boar, kept at the Civic Museum of Ligny Tower of Trapani

=== Natural areas ===
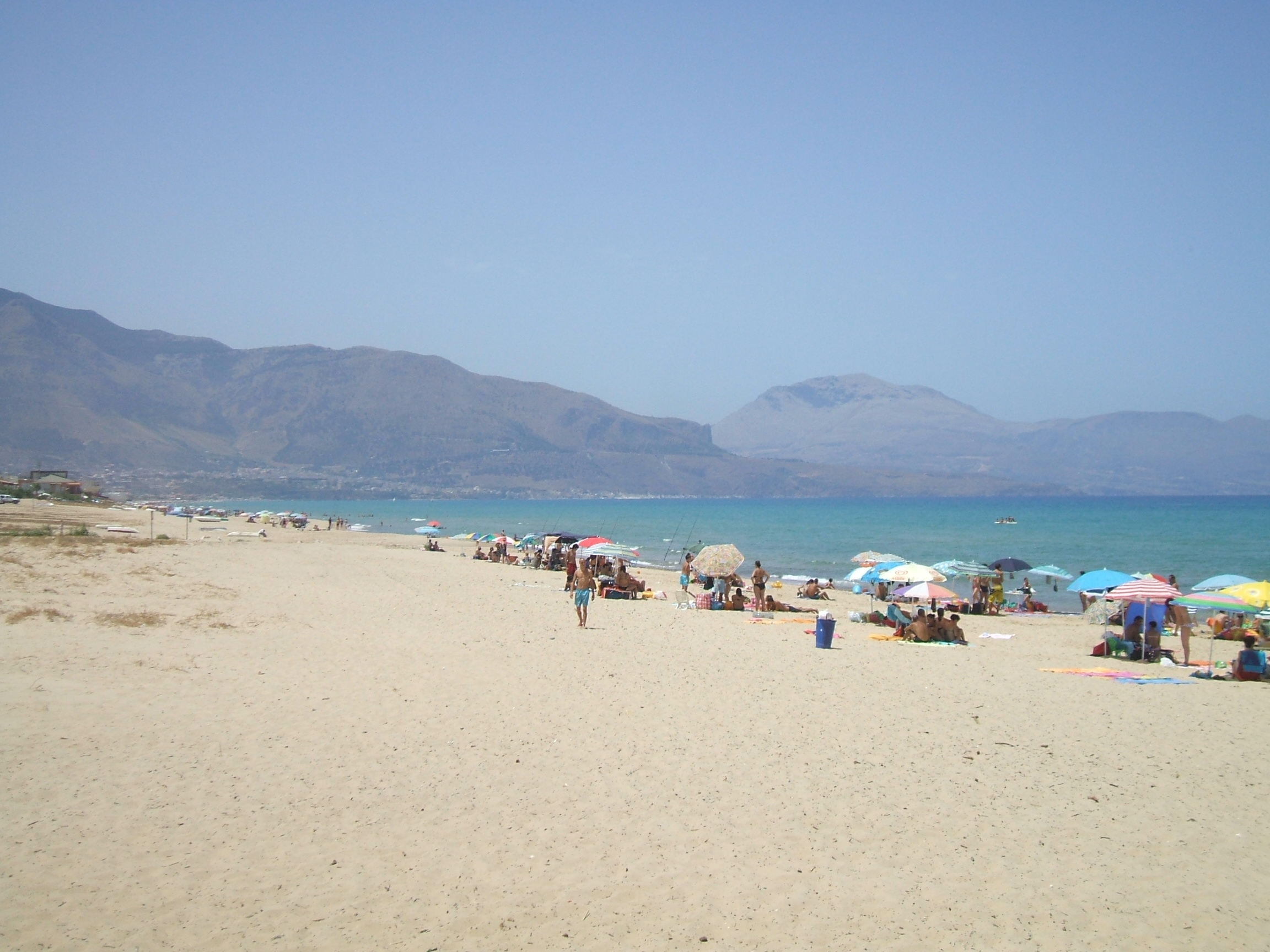
The beach of Alcamo Marina

Among the areas of naturalistic interest near Alcamo there are the beaches of Alcamo Marina, the Nature Reserve Bosco di Alcamo on Mount Bonifato and the Segestan thermal baths. The hot springs are produced by the reclimbing of water of meteoric origin which meets the water of Fiume Caldo. They are seven kilometres far from Alcamo and next to the boundary with the territory of Castellammare del Golfo, a small town which shares this naturalistic attraction with Alcamo. According to the narration given by Diodorus Siculus, they were created by the nymphs to favour Eracle's rest during his trip from Piloro to Erice.

=== Hinterland ===
The surrounding areas include interesting touristic and historical locations like Segesta and Gibellina. The old fishing village of Scopello, 20 kilometres (12 miles) from Alcamo, has been referred to as having a remarkable seaside. Another small town considered worth visiting is Castellammare del Golfo which is between these two places.

== Society ==
=== Demographical evolution ===
Historical population
Year	Pop.	±%
1861	19,531	—
1871	20,934	+7.2%
1881	37,497	+79.1%
1901	51,798	+38.1%
1911	32,211	−37.8%
1921	63,765	+98.0%
1931	51,687	−18.9%
1936	38,396	−25.7%
1951	41,815	+8.9%
1961	43,097	+3.1%
1971	41,596	−3.5%
1981	42,339	+1.8%
1991	42,621	+0.7%
2001	43,890	+3.0%
2011	45,314	+3.2%
Source: Statistiche I.Stat ISTAT URL consultato in data 28 December 2012.

=== Ethnic groups and foreign minorities ===
According to the ISTAT data of 1 January 2013, the foreign people resident in Alcamo were 1,258 people corresponding to the 2.58% of the residing population. The most represented nationalities, according to the percentage on the total residing population, were:

- Romania 727 (1.62%)
- Morocco 155 (0.34%)
- Tunisia 118 (0.26%)
- Albania 60 (0.13%)
- China 31 (0.07%)
- Poland 22 (0.05%)
- Serbia 15 (0.03%)

== Culture ==
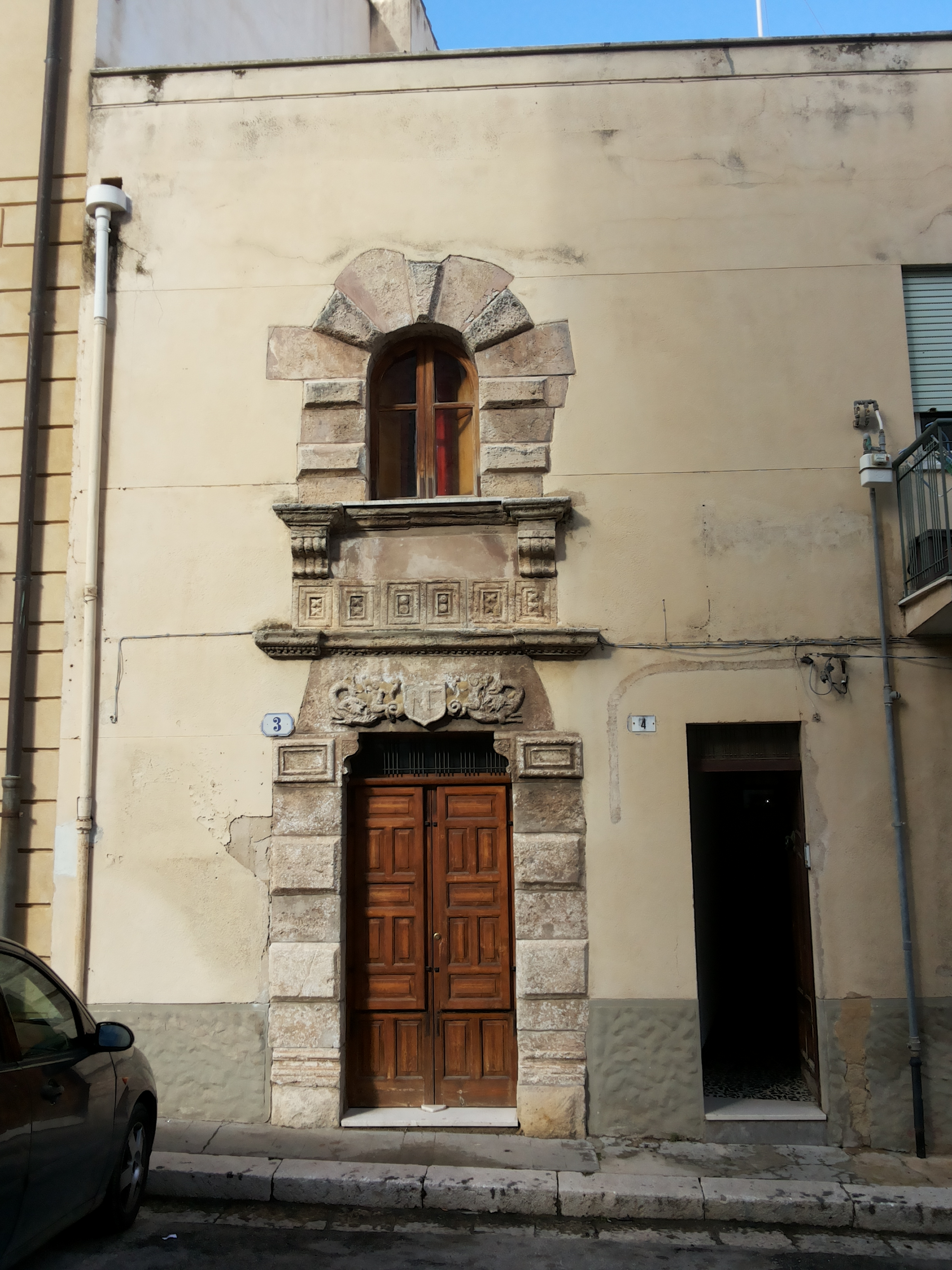
Presumed house of Cielo d'Alcamo

The poet Cielo d'Alcamo (known also as "Ciullo d'Alcamo") was the author of the contrasto "Rosa fresca aulentissima". He wrote in vernacular in the 12th century and was from Alcamo. Many important places of the town, such as the main square, the theatre and the Classical Lyceum founded in 1862, have been named after the famous poet.

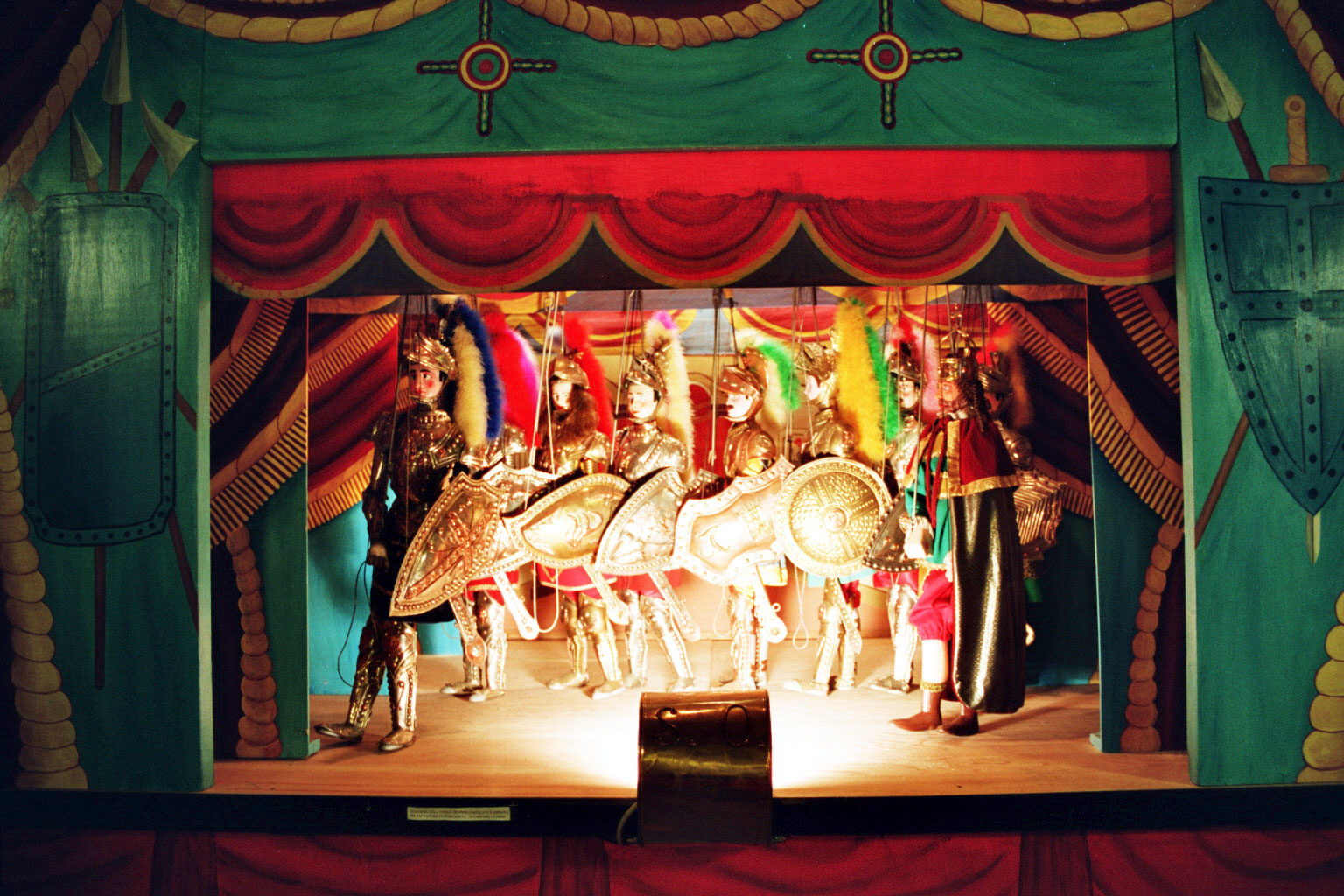
Puppet theatre of Alcamo

From the cultural point of view, in the following centuries Alcamo saw the rise of activities connected with arts such as the construction of churches and buildings, first in the baroque and then Renaissance style, with the coming of several artists of international level: painters (like Guglielmo Borremans and the very talented Pietro Novelli from Monreale), sculptors (Antonello Gagini and Giacomo Serpotta) and other various artists who embellished the town's image.

Inside the Castle of the Counts of Modica there is a puppet theatre: it has born again thanks to the engagement of Salvatore Oliveri, the grandson of the puppet master Gaspare Canino, who worked in Alcamo for about 50 years, continuing the work of Luigi, his father. They often give performances inside the castles or in the square.

It is also noteworthy the activity of Compagnia Piccolo Teatro, a theatre company founded in 1976, which has seen the rise (and success) of some actors and theatre directors.

During the feasts in Alcamo there are often streets entertainers and pedlars selling sweets, dried fruit and different objects in their stands called "baracchelle".

=== Museums ===
Inside Alcamo churches there are several artistic works. Apart from foreign artists, there were painters Giuseppe Renda and Gino Patti; among the living artists Turi Simeti, Vito Bongiorno and Gisella Giovenco; sculptors were Giuseppe Bambina, Pietro Montana and Nicola Rubino.

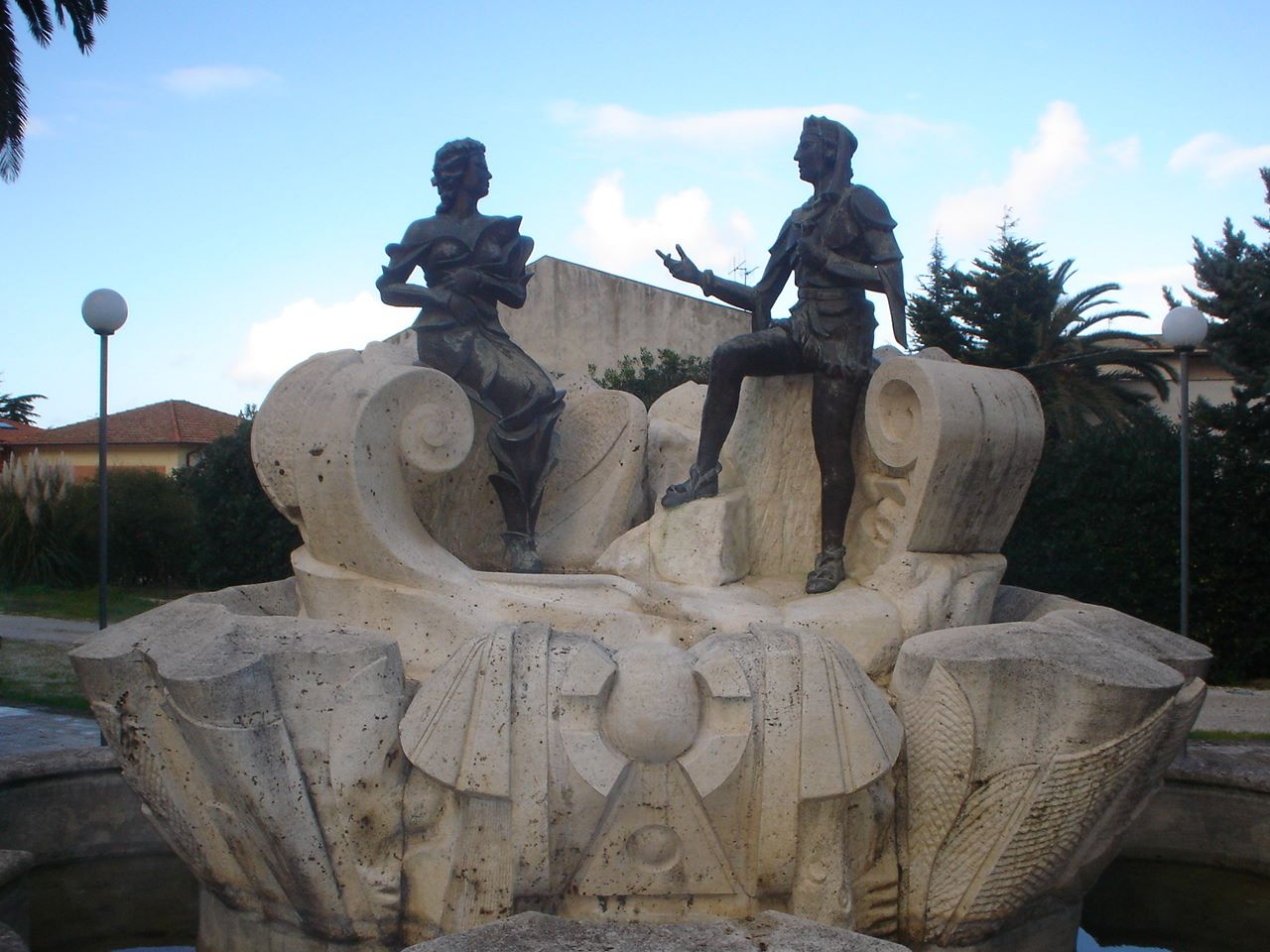
The monument to Cielo d'Alcamo, realized by Mariano Cassarà

- Museum of Contemporary Art, located inside the Ex Jesuits' College in Piazza Ciullo.
- Museum of Multiethnic Musical Instruments "Fausto Cannone": it is located inside the Ex Church of Saint James of the Sword near the Castle of the Counts of Modica and Piazza della Repubblica. It hosts a collection of 202 multiethnic instruments (collected by Professor Fausto Cannone in different parts of the world) such as: rebab, sarinda, gansira, swarpeti, bansuri, takita, marambao, vojnica e iakir.
- Sacred Art Museum: inside the Basilica of Our Lady of the Assumption There are many paintings, sculptures and other works coming from the town churches, dating from the 13th century to the 20th.
- Monument to Cielo d'Alcamo: the work, realized by the sculptor Mariano Cassarà, is a faithful representation of the scene of the famous Contrasto entitled "Rosa fresca aulentissima", written in 1240 by Cielo d'Alcamo, the first Italian poet who made use of lingua volgare. The two bronze statues represent the poet and his beloved; it is completed by the artistic fountain made with Travertine, and the coat of arms of Alcamo.
- Regional Vinotek of Western Sicily: located inside the Castle of the Counts of Modica.

=== Media ===
There is a local radio, Radio Alcamo Centrale, which operates in the territory since 1976.

The oldest periodical in Alcamo is "Il Bonifato".

The networks in Alcamo are Alpa Uno (since 1976) and Video Sicilia (since 1987).

=== Music ===
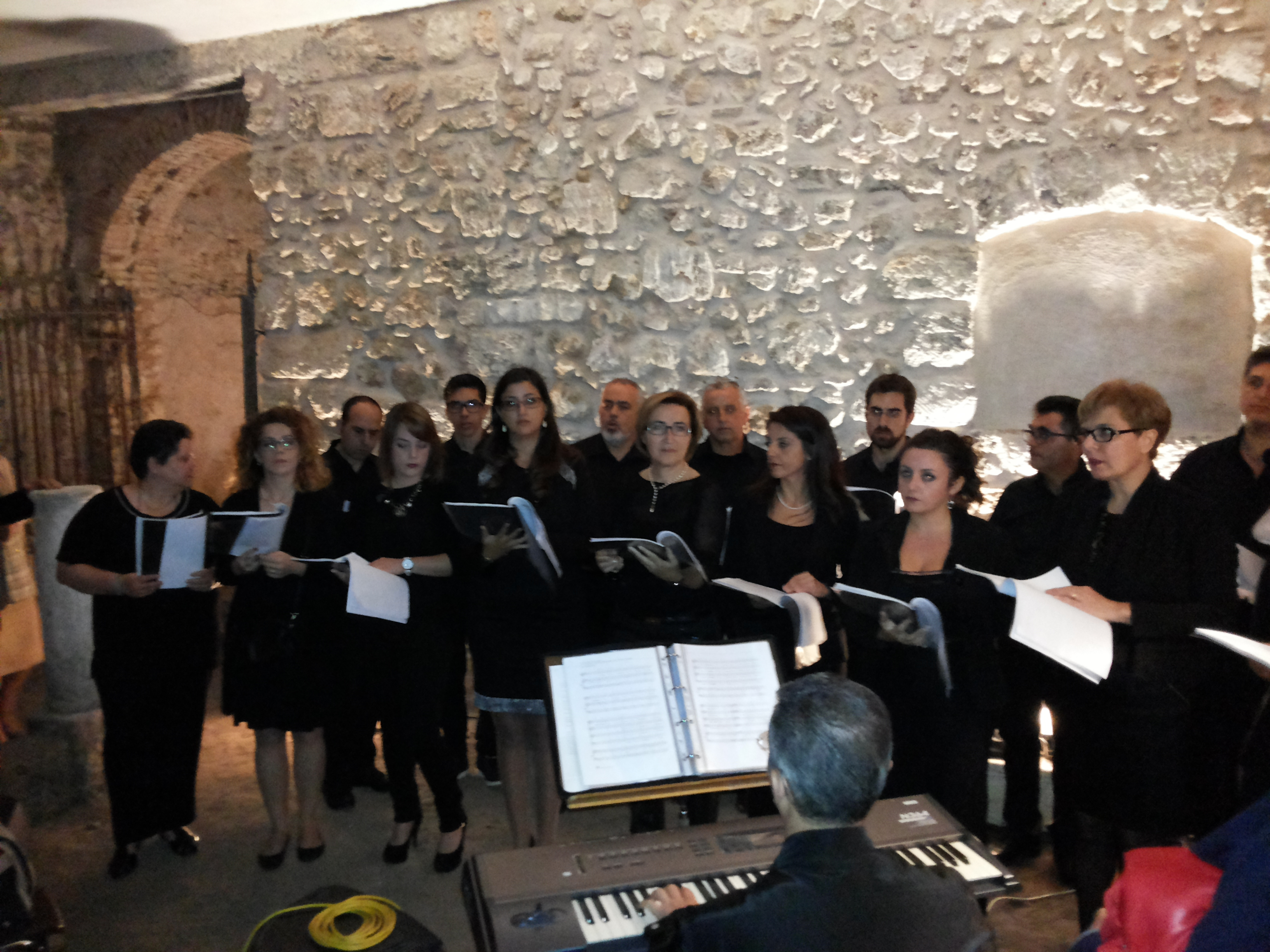
Exhibition of the Choir "Mater Dei" inside the garden of Palazzo Rocca

There are various musical associations in Alcamo:

- the Premiato Complesso Bandistico "Città di Alcamo", which is the oldest band in the province of Trapani, was founded in 1880 . In the first years it was led by the baron Giuseppe Triolo di Sant'Anna. In 1892, during a contest with the other Sicilian musical bands (and under the direction of the Maestro Raffaele Caravaglios), it won the honour Diploma and the golden Medal, that is why it is named premiato(=prized).
- The Brass Group, has been the promoter of the "Summertime Blues Festival", which was held for various consecutive years in Piazza Ciullo and where blues singers and musicians from different parts of the world took part.
- The Associazione Amici della Musica (Association of Friends of Music), founded in 1986, organizes an annual season of classical and contemporary music concerts held in Alcamo and surrounding localities. Since 1998 it has run an annual singing competition open to young opera singers of all nationalities. In 2001 the association also established the international cultural prize known as "Vissi d'Arte-Città di Alcamo". An annual prize, the "Vissi d'Arte" is awarded to individuals who have made exceptional contributions to art and society.
- The Associazione Jacopone da Todi, is a chorus founded in 1989: it has the objective of spreading the knowledge of holy art, in its different expressions; the director is Gaetano Stellino, a school teacher.
- The Coro Mater Dei is a musical association born in 1998 and made up of about 30 members; it has held various concerts (especially during the Christmas holidays) in Alcamo and in the province of Trapani. The chorus master is Baldo Barone.
- The Coro Francesca Adragna was founded in 2008 under the direction of the chorus master Maria Messana. It has a very varied repertory: arias from operettas, opera melodies, church music, Sicilian popular tunes and Neapolitan songs.

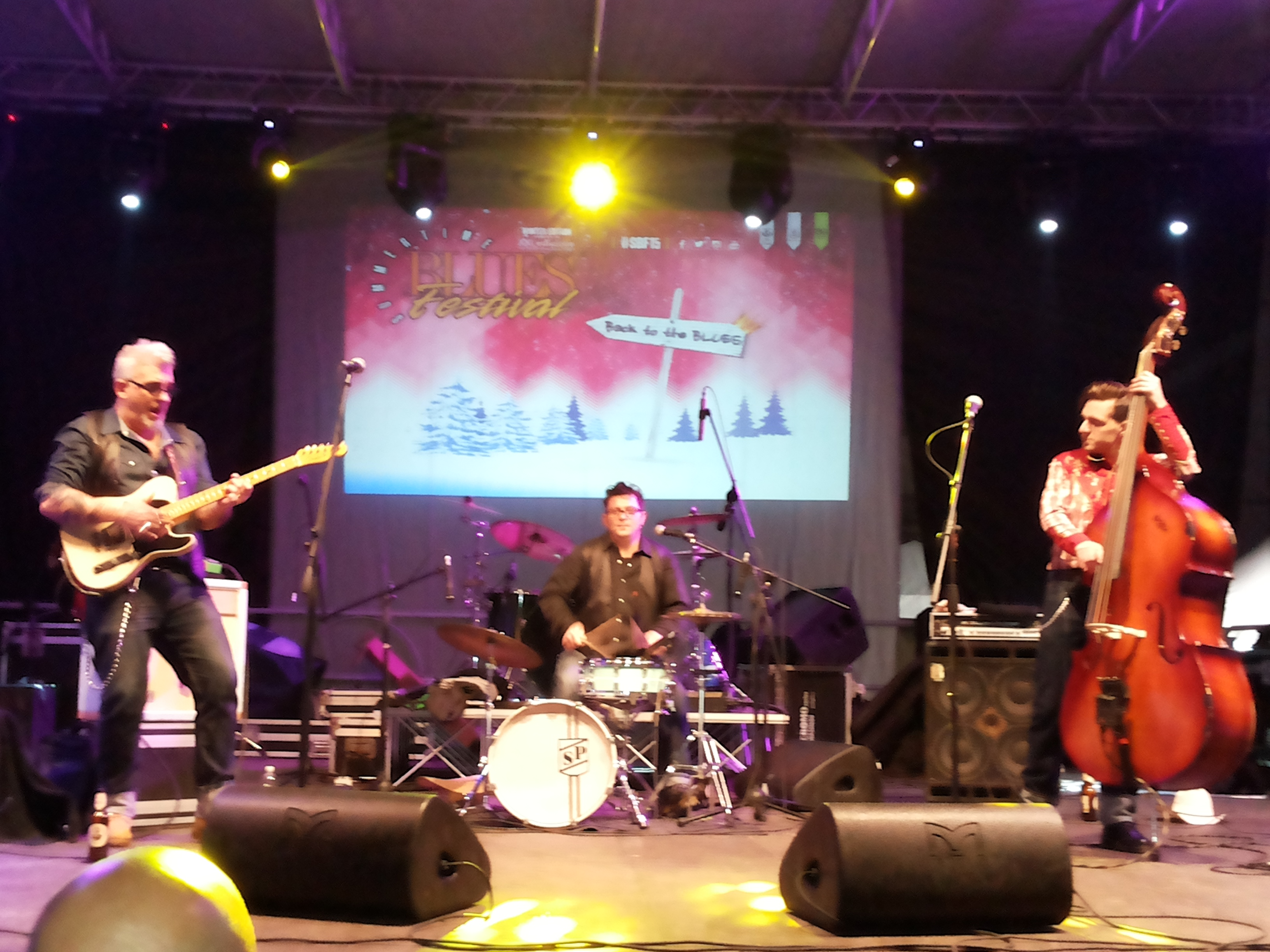
A live concert during XXI edition of the Summertime Blues Festival, in piazza Ciullo

=== Dance ===
There are different school dances in Alcamo, such as:

- Whisky a Gogò: it has organized for 20 years the Concorso Nazionale coreografico Danzalcamo: Sara Renda, the ètoile at the Opéra National de Bordeaux, started his career as a dancer in this school.

=== Religious traditions and folklore ===
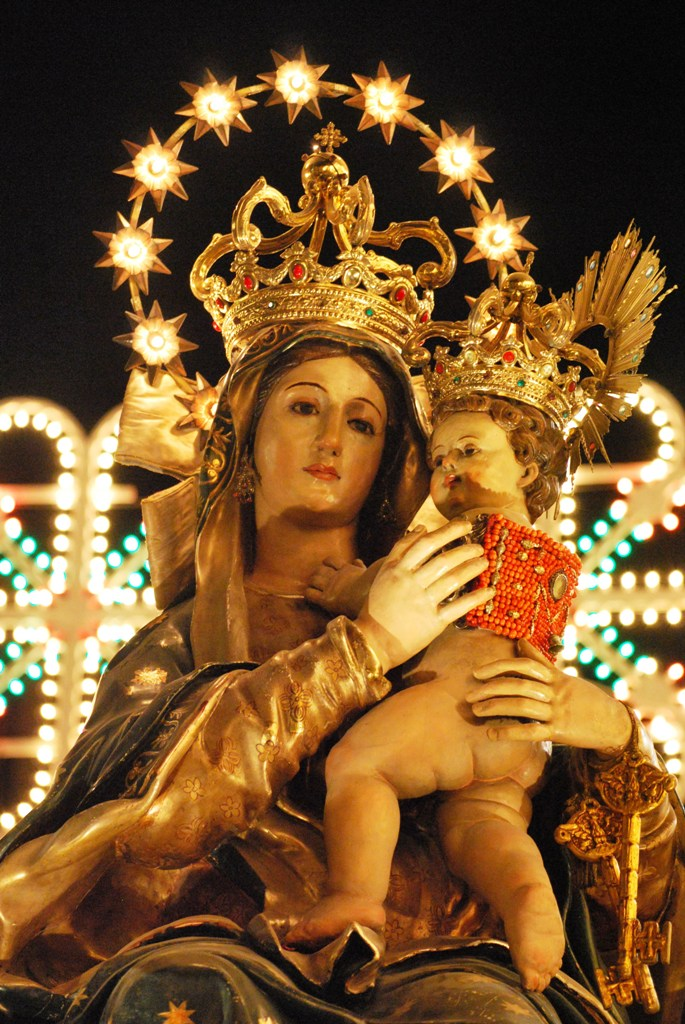
The simulacrum of Madonna of the Miracles during a traditional procession

- 19 March: celebration in honour of Saint Joseph (novena and procession)
- Good Friday: procession of the Dead Jesus and Our Lady of Sorrow.
- First Sunday after Easter: Feast of Jesus Christ the Redeemer (cultural and religious event).
- Second Sunday after Easter: celebration in honour of Saint Francis of Paola (cultural and religious event).
- Third Sunday after Easter: Feast of Patrocinio in honour of the Holy Family (procession and lunch with the Holy Family).
- 1 May: celebration in honour of Saint Joseph the Worker (novena and procession)
- 13 June: celebration in honour of Saint Anthony of Padua (novena and procession)
- 19–21 June: Celebration in honour of Maria Santissima dei Miracoli (Saint Mary of Miracles, the patron saint of Alcamo): cultural and religious events. During the feast there are a solemn procession of the Madonna's simulacrum, fireworks from the "bastione" in Piazza Bagolino and the descent of civil and political authorities to the Sanctuary of Madonna of Miracles. In the past (until 8–10 years ago) there were horse races along Corso 6 Aprile; the last two times they took place in Viale Italia.
- End of July: Saint Anne's feast with novena, procession and cultural-recreational activities.
- 8 September (Nativity of Mary): celebrations at the Sanctuary of Most Holy Mary of the Height (Madonna dell'Alto) on the top of Mount Bonifato with dialect poems recitation and procession.
- 7–8 December: celebration in honour of Immacolata Concezione (the Immaculate Conception): novena, pastoral melodies and procession.
- Alcamo Christmas (concerts, outdoor performances, preparation of traditional Christmas cribs and pipers' passing).

=== Recreational activities ===
- July–August: Alcamo Estate ("sagras" or festivals, "Calici di Stelle", "Blues Festival", "Festival di Nuove Impressioni")
- July–August: Concorso Nazionale Coreografico Danzalcamo
- Second half of August: "Alcart – legalità e cultura" (Legality and Culture) a series of events (exhibitions, seminars, music, theatre etc.).
- October: Concorso Internazionale per Cantanti Lirici “Città di Alcamo”, organized since 1998 by the Associazione Amici della Musica of Alcamo.
- Second or third week-end of December: Cortiamo – International Contest of short films organized since 2006 by "Segni Nuovi" (a club of cinematographic culture within the Church of the Saints Paul and Bartholomew).

=== Sport events ===
- 2–6 January: International Costa Gaia Trophy (youth soccer tournament).
- European lightweight title (professional boxing) was contested in Alcamo on 14 August 1991. Defending champion Antonio Renzo (from Calabria) stopped British challenger Paul Charters in the 11th round.

=== Local market ===
The local market in Alcamo (called "mercatino") takes place every Wednesday morning in Via Tre Santi, near Viale Italia.

== Cuisine ==
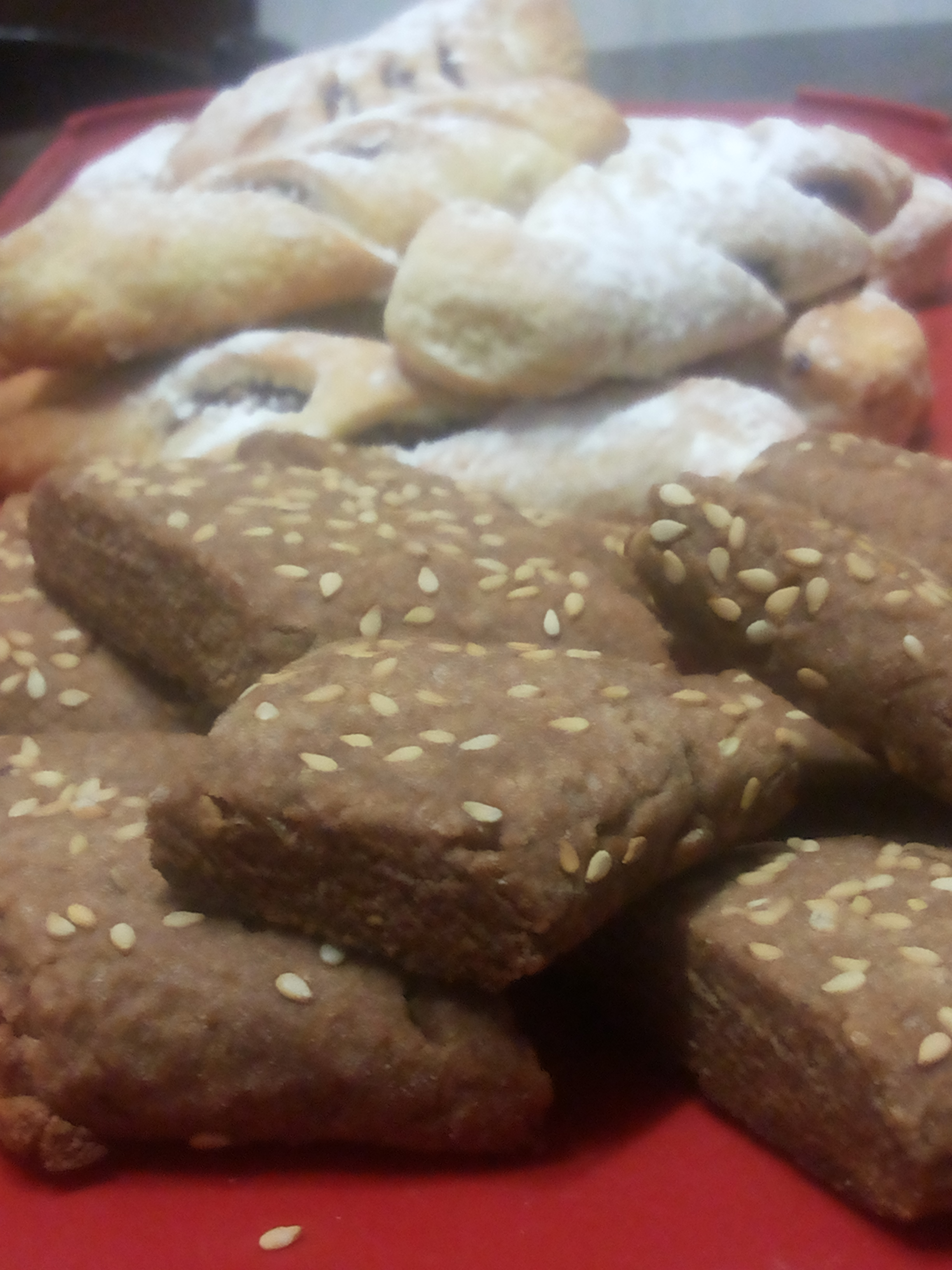
"Mustazzola" (in front) and "cuddureddi" (behind)

Some specialities of cuisine of Alcamo are:

- Handmade maccheroni
- Pasta con le sarde: Pasta with "finocchi and sarde" (wild fennel and sardines)
- Sausages with cavuliceddi (a typical Alcamo vegetable)
- Dried filled tomatoes
- Cuddureddi (Christmas fig sweets)
- Tetù (mixed spice chocolate biscuits)
- Sciù (cream sweets)
- Muffulette (A bread roll with ricotta or other fillings)

== People ==
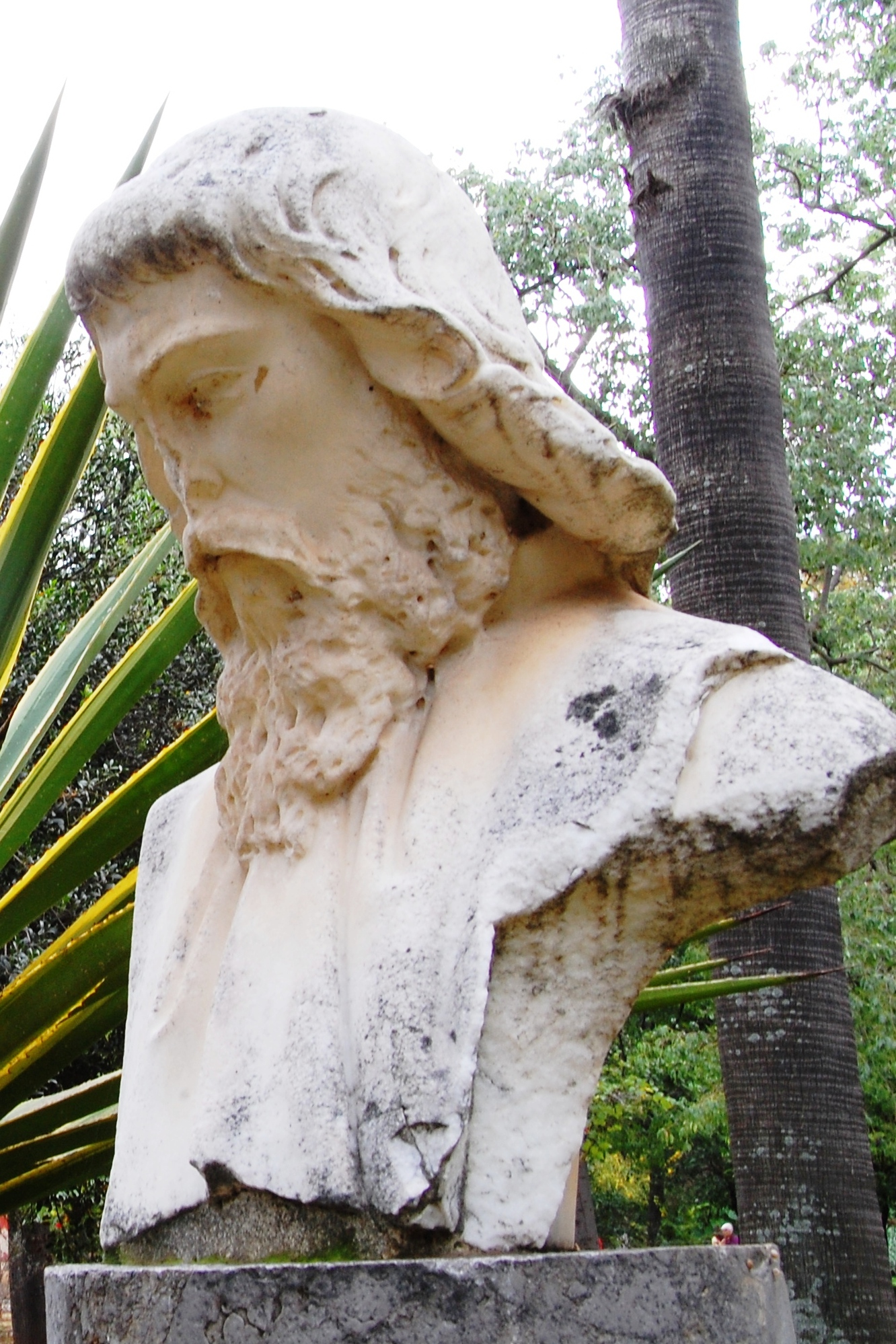
Marble bust of Cielo d'Alcamo inside Villa Giulia

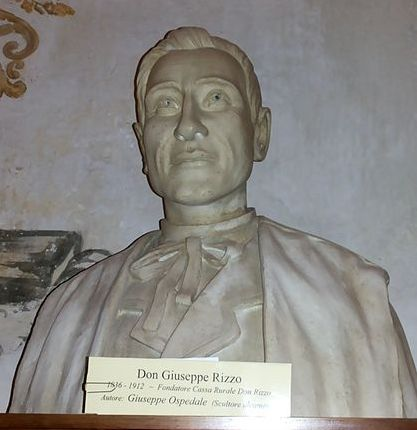
A bust of Don Giuseppe Rizzo, kept inside the Civic Library of Alcamo

- Cielo d'Alcamo (13th century), poet
- Arcangelo Placenza from Calatafimi (1390–1460), presbyter and Franciscan friar
- Sebastiano Bagolino (1560–1604), poet and painter
- Guglielmo Borremans (1672–1744), Flemish painter
- Ignazio De Blasi (1717–1783), historian
- Giuseppe Renda (1772–1805), painter
- Felice Pastore Cambon (1786–1862), baron of Rincione, politician and benefactor
- Francesco Mistretta (1798–1862), politician and judge
- Girolamo Caruso (1842–1923), agronomist and teacher at university
- Pietro Maria Rocca (1847–1918), historian
- Francesco Maria Mirabella (1850–1931), historian, school teacher, poet
- Giuseppe Rizzo (1863–1912), presbyter, founder of the homonymous Cassa Rurale ed Artigiana
- Nino Navarra (poet) (1885–1917) poet, writer, gold medal for his military value
- Vito Fazio Allmayer (1885–1958), philosopher, pedagogist and university teacher
- Pietro Montana (1890–1978), sculptor, painter and teacher
- Peter H. Ruvolo (1895–1943), lawyer and politician
- Gaspare Canino (1900–1977), puppeteer
- Nicola Rubino (1905–1984), sculptor and painter
- Vincenzo Regina (1910–2009), historian, presbyter
- Salvatore Asta (1915–2004), Catholic archbishop and diplomat
- Gino Patti (1925–1993), painter
- Ludovico Corrao (1927–2011), politician and senator
- Turi Simeti (1929–2021), painter
- Carlo Cataldo (1933–2021), historian and poet
- Vincenza Bono Parrino (1942), Minister of Cultural and Environmental Heritage in De Mita's government and teacher
- Giacomo Romano Davare (1945), writer, stage director and teacher.\
- Gisella Giovenco (Ferrara, 1946) painter, stylist and publicist
- Franca Viola (1947), the first Italian woman who refused the repairing wedding
- Antonino Raspanti (1959), Catholic bishop
- Benedetto Lo Monaco (1960), actor
- Vito Bongiorno (1963), painter
- Calandra & Calandra (Maurizio 1960, Giuseppe 1969), Folk singers
- Christian Rocca (1968), journalist and writer
- Stefano La Colla, tenor
- Domenico Piccichè (1970), pianist and teacher
- Ignazio Corrao (1984), politician and eurosceptic eurodeputy
- Sara Renda (1991), singer at the Opéra National de Bordeaux

== Economy ==
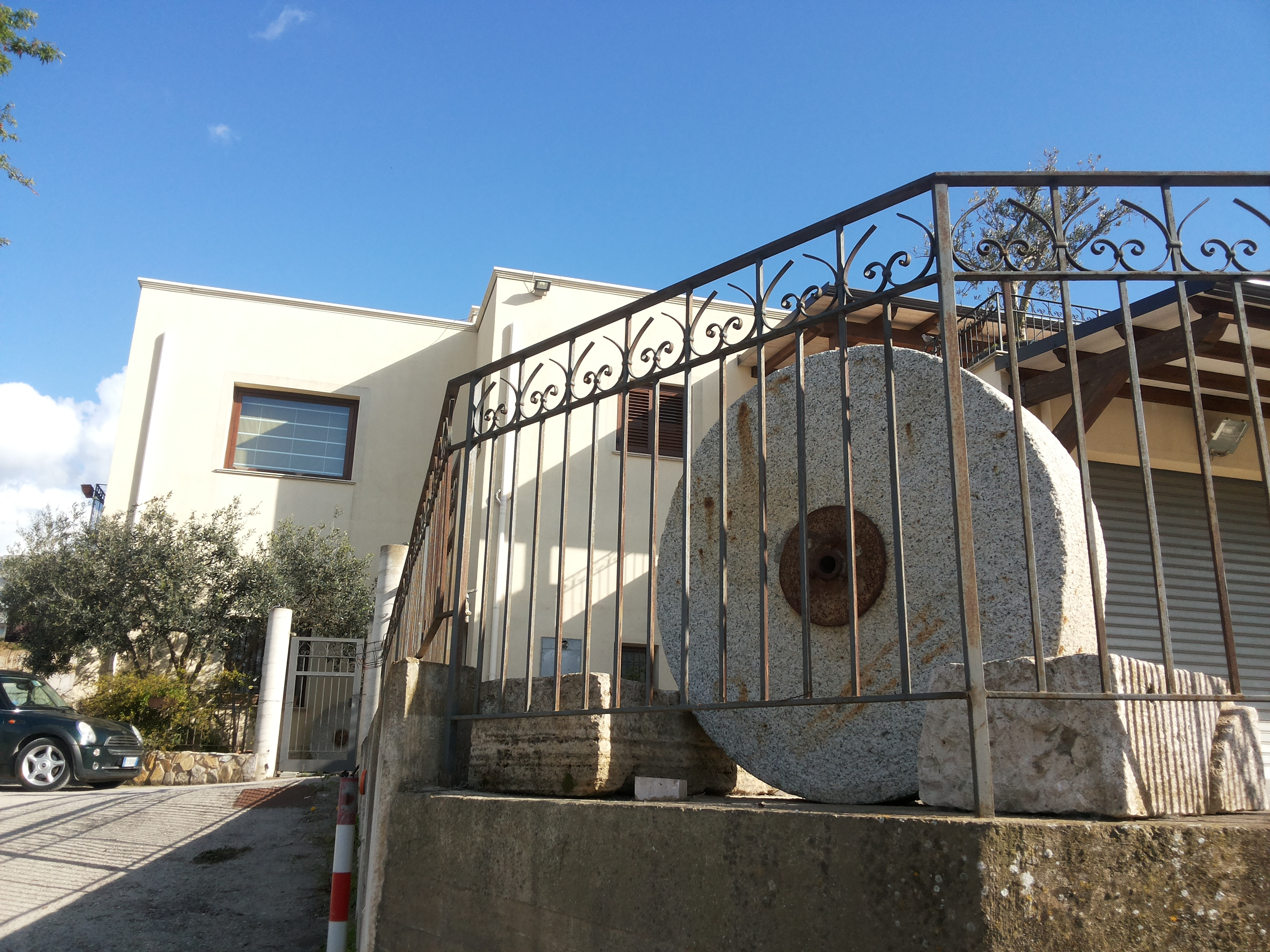
An oil mill in Alcamo (Antico Frantoio Vallone)

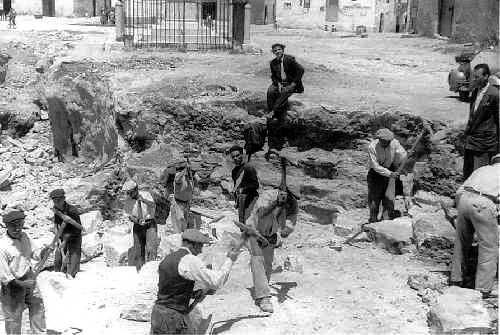
The stone quarry in Piano Santa Maria (1953)

Alcamo is one of the most important centres in Sicily for wine production, especially Bianco Alcamo D.O.C., produced from vineyards in the western Sicilian Val di Mazara wine region, using espalier or "tendone" structures and using white common or bright catarratto vines, eventually associated with damaschino, grecanico and trebbiano.

Besides the wine activity there are cattle and sheep breeding, olive growing (for the extraction of extra virgin olive oil), cereals (particularly wheat) and the typical oval melon, with a green wrinkled peel, locally called "miluni purceddu", which has the peculiarity that can be kept longer than other kinds of melon.

In the primary sector it is also significant quarrying (of different marbles and mostly travertino), though the tertiary sector (more or less advanced) has however got the majority of employed people.

== Transports and infrastructures ==
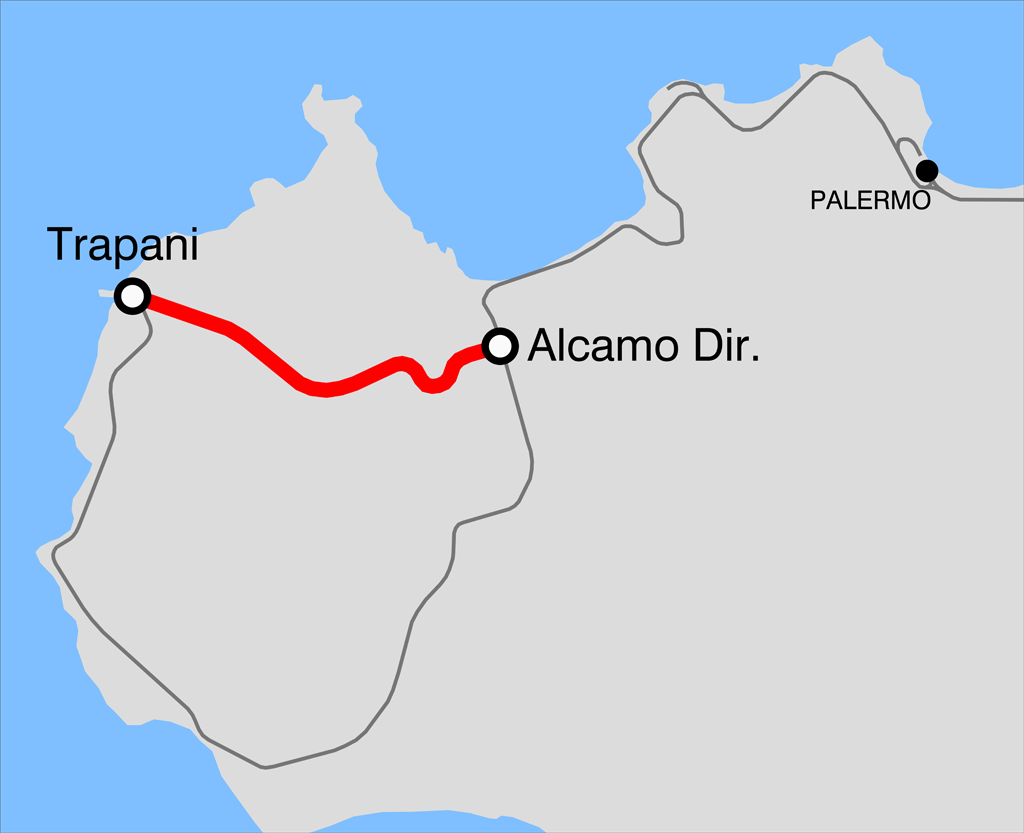
Railway route between Alcamo and Trapani

There are two motorway junctions from A29 motorway Palermo-Mazara del Vallo: Alcamo Est and Alcamo Ovest, apart the junction of Castellammare del Golfo which links up with the north entrance to Alcamo. Another motorway junction is from Alcamo Ovest (A29 motorway, diramazione Alcamo-Trapani). Alcamo is crossed by two National Roads: strada statale 113, connecting Trapani with Messina, and strada statale 119, connecting Alcamo with Castelvetrano. The Railway line doesn't pass through the town centre but along the coast, then inland on the west side. The railway station of Alcamo Diramazione is located near the motorway junction of Alcamo Ovest and the station of Castellammare del Golfo is situated in the territory of Alcamo, precisely at Alcamo Marina.

These State Highways (or National Roads) pass through Alcamo:

- SS 113 Settentrionale Sicula;
- SS 119 of Gibellina;
- SS 187 of Castellammare del Golfo;
- SS 731 Link Road (Bretella) of Castellammare del Golfo;
- SS 732 Link Road (Bretella) of Alcamo Est;
- SS 733 Link Road (Bretella) of Alcamo Ovest.

These Regional Roads (SR) of Sicily:

- SR 2 Parti Piccolo-Quaranta Salme-Croce di Fratacchia;
- SR 3 Alcamo-Giardinaccio-Rocche Cadute-San Nicola;
- SR 5 Bivio Quaranta Salme-Bivio Sant'Anna;
- SR 6 of Calatubo;
- SR 8 Amburgio-Morfino-Rincione-Coda di Volpe.

And also these Provincial Roads (SP) of the province of Trapani pass through Alcamo:

- SP 10 for Camporeale;
- SP 33 of Fiumefreddo
- SP 47 for Alcamo-Station of Castellammare del Golfo;
- SP 49 for Passofondo;
- SP 55 Alcamo-Alcamo Marina.
- SP 64 Quattrovie.

In the area of Alcamo there are also the following draining roads of the province of Trapani:

- SB 21 Bisurdo-Stracciabisacce;
- SB 22 Case di Piraino;
- SB 23 Maruggi-Montelongo.

Along the National Road Palermo-Sciacca (SS 624) there is the exit "Alcamo" in both directions and is about 30 km from on the south-west side of the town. This exit, wholly located in the territory of Poggioreale, connects with the National Road of Gibellina (SS 119) near the ex railway station and motorway junction of Gallitello through the Provincial road SP9 (of the series n.182 Macchia-Sella-Bonfalco) and the SB0 (a local link road of Gibellina), to the border between the territories of Poggioreale and Monreale.

Alcamo is about 40 km from the airport "Falcone-Borsellino Airport" of Palermo-Punta Raisi and about 50 km from the "Vincenzo Florio Airport" of Trapani-Birgi.

== Administration ==
=== Twin towns ===
- Jelgava, Latvia

== Sport ==
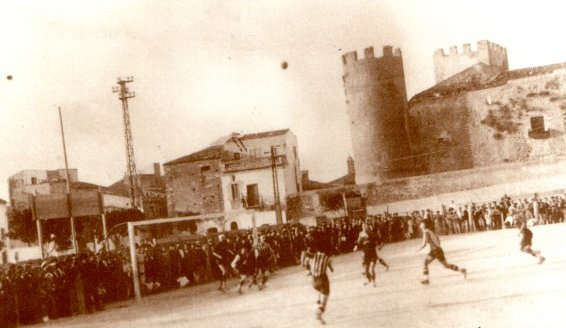
Alcamo football team during a match in 1928

A popular and practised sport in Alcamo, as in other Italian towns, is soccer; the team is the Alcamo team, which was in the past a protagonist in some football seasons in League C (Italian Serie C), for its victories against Bari and Crotone, and in League D. Apart various regional trophies, it has won the Coppa Italia Dilettanti in 1996 and the subsequent Supercoppa Italiana Dilettanti. Together with the golden period in League C, these were the most notable pages of the football history in Alcamo. A recent society crisis has caused bankruptcy and the team which played in League D had to restart from the First Category League. Today it competes in the regional Eccellenza championship following the 2010 refoundation. The activity of juvenile soccer is very active, and the Adelkam football school emerges among the various youth teams because it has launched different football players and has won a lot of national and international competitions. Alcamo is also the principal centre of the Costa Gaia International Trophy, a youth football kermess in which a lot of titled teams take part and where many players of the bigger championships have been the protagonists.

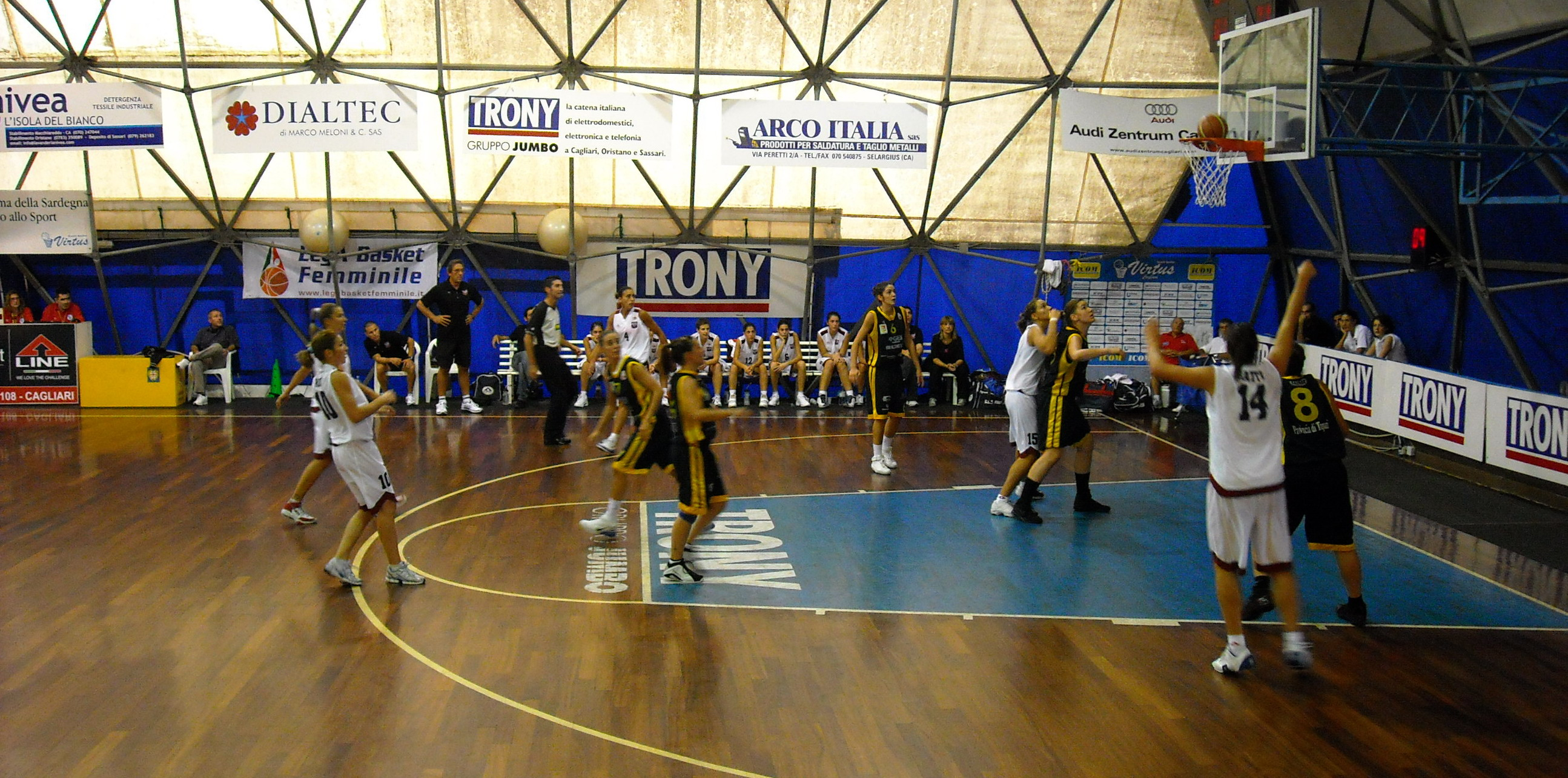
Basket Alcamo against CUS Cagliari Pallacanestro

Basketball is also popular, today with better results than football anyway. The female team Basket Alcamo (Gea Magazzini) which has obtained important results in its history (a long participation in A1 League and the final match in the Ronchetti Cup), has played in the A2 League for eleven years, and has regained the major league in the season 2011–2012. The male team has also obtained good results, but not at the same levels.

The local handball team, Pallamano Alcamo plays its home matches at the Palasport Enzo D'Angelo.

=== Sports facilities ===
The town has several sports facilities, the most important are the stadium Lelio Catella (with a capacity of about 10,000 people) for football and athletics, the Palazzetto dello Sport (sports hall) Tre Santi for Basket and the Palasport Enzo D'Angelo (an indoor stadium) for handball.

There is a private swimming pool open to public use (La Fenice) where young boys (who have won National prizes) train regularly. In the same facility there is an ice-skating rink. When Alcamo football team played in League C, the home matches were played at stadium Don Rizzo, which together with Sant'Ippolito stadium, is now used by juvenile and minor teams.

=== Sports personalities ===
- Gino Colaussi (1914–1991), national football player and trainer for Alcamo team
- Charley Fusari (1924–1985), US boxer
- Cynthia Cooper (1963), ex player for Basket Alcamo
- Jean Alesi (1964), ex French car-racer
- Antonino Asta (1970), ex football player and trainer.
- Lisa Leslie (1972), ex player for Basket Alcamo
- Giuseppe Scurto (1984), ex football player and trainer.
- Giacomo Di Donato (1988), ex football player

== See also ==
- Alcamo Marina

== Sources ==
- Regina, Vincenzo (1972). Profilo storico di Alcamo e sue opere d'arte dalle origini al secolo XV (in Italian). Edizioni Accademia di Studi "Cielo d'Alcamo".
- Mirabella, Francesco M. (1876). Cenni degli alcamesi rinomati in scienze, lettere, arti, armi e santità. Alcamo: Surdi.
- Le guide oro – Sicilia. Firenze: Casa editrice Bonechi. 1992.
- Calia, Roberto; Craparo, Enzo; Baldassano Cataldo, Erina (1991). La Bella Alcamo. Alcamo: Edizioni Blu Imaging & Adv.
- Chiarelli, Andrea; Cocchiara, Dario (2005). Alcamo nel XX secolo, Volume I: 1900–1943 (in Italian). Campo Edizioni.
- Chiarelli, Andrea; Cocchiara, Dario (2009). Alcamo nel XX secolo, Volume II: 1944–1999 (in Italian). Campo Edizioni.
- Orlandi, Cesare (1770). Delle location d'Italia e sue isole adjacenti compendiose notizie (in Italian).
- San Martino De Spucches, Francesco; Gregorio, Mario (2013). La storia dei feudi e di titoli nobiliari della Sicilia dalla loro origini ai nostri giorni (in Italian). Lulu.com. ISBN 978-1-300-84355-9.
- Gruppo Archeologico Drepanon (2014). Bonifato – La montagna ritrovata (in Italian). Trapani: Il Sole editrice. ISBN 978-88-905457-3-3.
- Bembina, G. B.; Mirabella, Francesco Maria; Pietro Maria, Rocca (1956). Alcamo sacra (in Italian). Alcamo: Tipografia Cartografica. Archived from the original on 11 March 2016.
- Malanima, Paolo (2009). Pre-Modern European Economy: One Thousand Years (10th–19th Centuries). BRILL. ISBN 978-90-04-17822-9.
- Marsala, M. T. (1980). Atlante di Storia Urbanistica Siciliana "Alcamo". Palermo: Flaccovio S.F.
- Mirabella, Gaspare (1981). Alcamo quello che resta... Alcamo: Sarograf.
- Mirabella, Francesco Maria (1980). Alcamensia noterelle storiche con appendici di documenti inediti. Alcamo: Sarograf.
- Calia, Roberto (1991). Una città da scoprire: Alcamo. Alcamo: Edizioni Blu Imaging & ADV.
- Calia, Roberto (1992). Lo Stemma della Città di Alcamo (attraverso i secoli). Alcamo: Sarograf.
- Regina, Vincenzo (1975). Storia società e cultura dal cinque al settecento. Alcamo: Edizioni Accademia di studi "Cielo D'Alcamo".
- Calia, Roberto (1997). I palazzi dell'aristocrazia e della borghesia alcamese. Alcamo: Carrubba.
- Regina, Vincenzo (1977). Ottocento alcamese storia e arte. Alcamo: Edizioni Accademia di studi "Cielo D'Alcamo".
- Regina, Vincenzo (1956). Brevi note su Alcamo del 1700. Alcamo: Edizioni Accademia di studi "Cielo D'Alcamo".
- Regina, Vincenzo (1992). Alcamo una città della Sicilia. Palermo: Aracne.
- Mirabella, Francesco Maria (1919). Sull'origine della città di Alcamo. Acireale: Popolare.
- Di Giovanni, V. (1876). Notizie storiche della città di Alcamo. Palermo: Amenta M.
- Rocca, Pietro Maria (1894). Delle muraglie e porte della città di Alcamo. Palermo: Lo Statuto.
- Regina, Vincenzo (1982). Bonifato Terra Sicana Elima da Lungaro a Longarico. Alcamo: Cartograf.
- Di Graziano, A. A. (1981). Note e documenti per la storia di Alcamo nei secoli XIII e XIV. Roma: Centro Ricerca.
- Regina, Vincenzo (1986). Alcamo, paesaggio urbano e rurale. Alcamo: Edizioni Leopardi.
- Bembina, G. B. (1979). Storia ragionata della città di Alcamo. Alcamo: Editrice Zulemia.
- De Blasi, Ignazio (1880). Della opulenta città di Alcamo. Discorso storico. Alcamo.
- Trasselli, C. (1971). Alcamo un comune feudale del trecento. Trapani: Corrao G.
- Regina, Vincenzo (1979). Alcamo dalla prima guerra mondiale ai giorni nostri. Alcamo: Edizioni di Studi "Cielo D'Alcamo".
- Mirabella, Francesco Maria; Rocca, Pietro Maria (1884). Guida artistica della città di Alcamo. Alcamo: Bagolino.
- Polizzi, G. (1879). I monumenti di antichità e d'arte della provincia di Trapani. Trapani.
- Maniaci, G.; Di Bernardo, R. (1974). Espansione e problema ecologico nel comprensorio di Alcamo. Alcamo: Damiano Campo.
- Città di Alcamo – Assessorato al Turismo (2002). Alcamo – un itinerario guidato per una città tutta da scoprire...
- Cataldo, Carlo (2001). La conchiglia di S. Giacomo. Alcamo: Edizioni Campo.
- Cataldo, Carlo (1982). Guida storico-artistica dei beni culturali di Alcamo, Calatafimi, Castellammare del golfo, Salemi, Vita. Alcamo: Sarograf.
- Regina, Vincenzo (2002). Cavalieri ospedalieri e pellegrini per le antiche vie della provincia di Trapani. Archived from the original on 22 October 2016.
- Longo, Ignazio (2013). Terra Alcami. Imago Urbis. Rappresentazioni iconografiche e cartografiche antiche. Rome: Aracne editrice. ISBN 978-88-548-6350-7.
