= Tower Calandrino =

- Alcamo in Italy
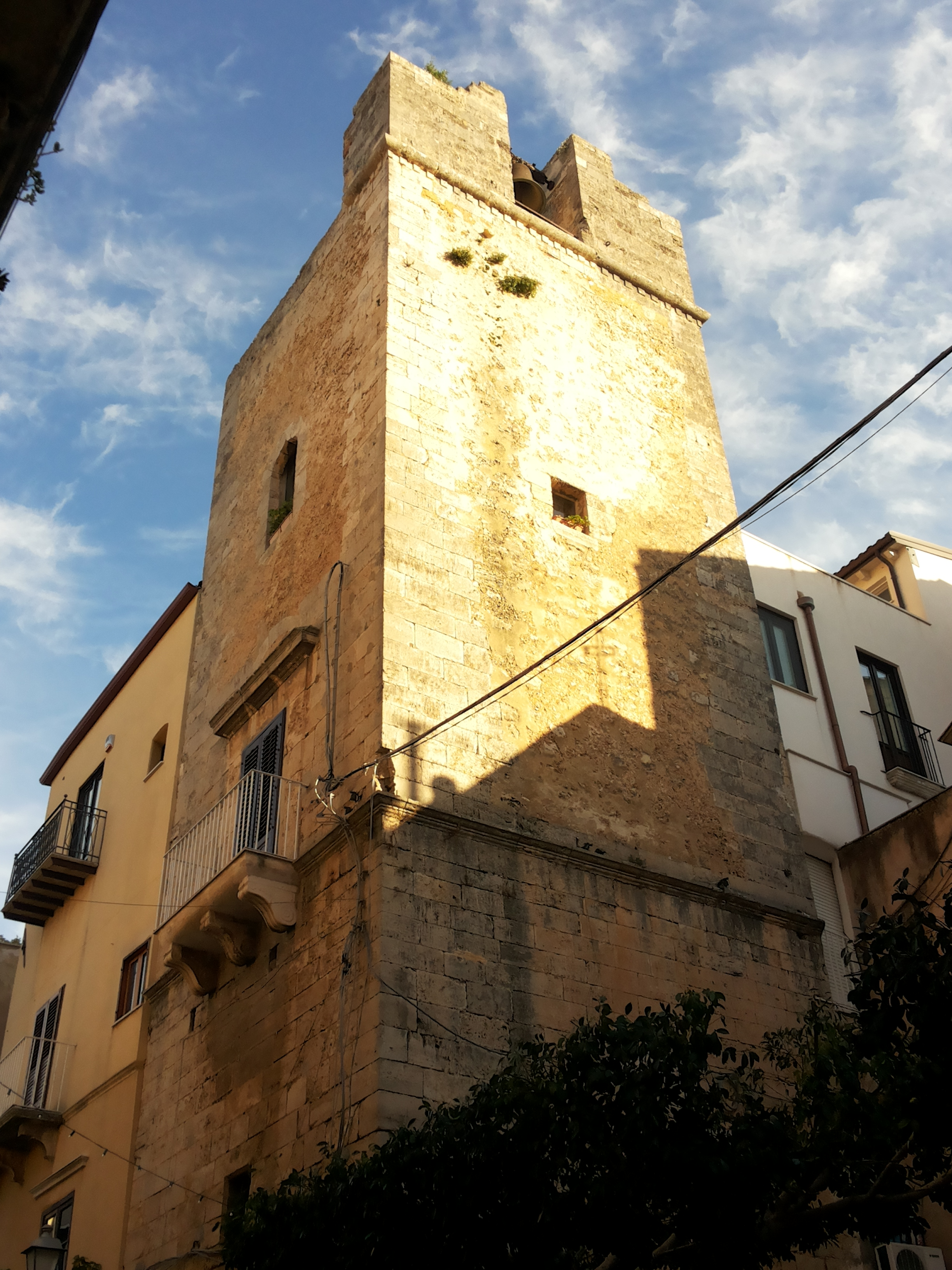
- A view of the tower

Site information
- Type: Watchtower and belltower
- Open to the public: no

Location
- Coordinates: 37°58′51″N 12°57′58″E
- Height: about 20 metres

Site history
- Built: 1519

The Tower Calandrino (or Bell tower of the Church of Saint Maria del Soccorso) is located in the old town of Alcamo, in the province of Trapani.

== History ==
There are not any historical references about the origin of this building before 1519, though according to some people it would date back to the Arab domination of Sicily, so becoming the most ancient building in the town centre of Alcamo, even antecedent to the Castle of the Counts of Modica (1350), of which it was originally a watchtower, later adapted to a belltower.

Its shape and structure (detached from the church, cistern and other characteristics inside it) could also let people think that it had been built before the years 1519–1520, and later reconstructed.

So it would have worked both as a watchtower and a belltower; in fact, it was bought by the Roman Catholic Diocese of Trapani in the early 15th century; the Church of Saint Maria del Soccorso benefitted from it after the Mother church, which had used it as a bell tower, built its own.

They put two bells on it: the bigger one on the west side and the smaller one on the north side, dismantled at about 1950 for safety reasons. It was abandoned until the middle 1800s, when a part of it was sold to other private citizens.

Today its owner is signor Ignazio Calandrino, who has adapted it to his needs, but wanted to keep its originality.

== Building of the bell tower ==
Neither from Giuseppe Polizzi's citation, nor Ignazio De Blasi's we can establish the year of its construction; however, we can infer it from the Guida artistica della città di Alcamo dated 1884, published by Francesco Maria Mirabella and Pietro Maria Rocca, where you can read at page 18:

Going ahead for the Corso, not far from the above said Oratory (the Ex Church of Saint Catherine of Monte di Pietà) and next to a fine bell tower shaped like a tower, built in the years 1519–20, you can see the Church of Saint Maria del Soccorso.

There are, in fact, two deeds: in the first one, dated 30 July 1519, Baldassare Cannone sold one hundred strong stone sheets (cantoni) to two rectors of the Confraternity, for the building of the bell tower of the same Confraternity, and in the second on 3 September 1520 (by the notary Orofino), Vincenzo Maniscalco and Nicolò Di Chiara sold Pietro Tabone, who represented the Confraternity, two hundreds small stone sheets and twenty bigger ones, ad opu di lu campanaru of that Confraternity.

The material declared in the two deeds corresponds, as for quantity and dimensions, to that one used for the construction of the bell tower, so the building of this structure surely dates back to the first half of the 15th century.

== Description ==
The tower is not a part of the Church as it is detached from the same of about 70 centimetres: only two sides are visible at present, because the remnant part is concealed by the neighbouring buildings. The main part of it, except from the final one with the bell) is 16,35 metres high: there are a small cornice of the 16th century in the middle part, and another one which is incomplete.

The basis, 1.65 metre high, is made with squared stones, about 65 centimetres long (two spans and a half) and about 40 centimetres large (a span and a half) as those indicated in the deed dated 30 July 1519.

At present the building is still quite unbroken, though over the centuries it has undergone various changes: for instance, the balcony overlooking corso 6 Aprile was added at about 1700.

Inside the construction there is a stone spiral staircase leading to the terrace, and formed by 85 steps (50 of them are winder treads and compact), each one 24 centimeters high on average.

This stairway has not undergone any restoration; on the walls of the rooms there is still the black of the smoke of the torchs that had lighted them for centuries. Below the tower there is a big cistern, which received rain from the terrace, through a specific pipeline, useful for its lodgers.

Apart from the original access from Piazzetta Monsignor Ricceri, you can also enter it directly from the house that forms an integral part.

== Sources ==
- Polizzi Giuseppe:I monumenti di antichità e d'arte della provincia di Trapani; tip. Giovanni Modica Romano, Trapani, 1879
- Guadalupi Gianni, Mariano Coppola: Alcamo, introduzione di Vincenzo Regina (collana Grand Tour);Grafiche Mazzucchelli, Milano,1995
- Cataldo Carlo: La conchiglia di S. Giacomo p. 74; Edizioni Campo, Alcamo, 2001
- Cataldo Carlo: Guida storico-artistica di Alcamo-Calatafimi-Castellammare del Golfo-Salemi-Vita p. 60; Sarograf, Alcamo,1982
- Rocca, Pietro Maria (1905). Di alcuni antichi edifizi in Alcamo. Palermo: tip. Castellano-Di Stefano.
- Bembina G. B.: Francesco Maria Mirabella, Pietro Maria Rocca: Alcamo sacra; Edizioni Accademia di Studi "Cielo D'Alcamo", Alcamo,1956;
- "il più antico edificio".

== See also ==
- Tower
- Bell tower
- Church of Saint Maria del Soccorso
- Alcamo
- Castle of the Counts of Modica (Alcamo)
