= Palazzo Fraccia =

Palace in Alcamo, Italy

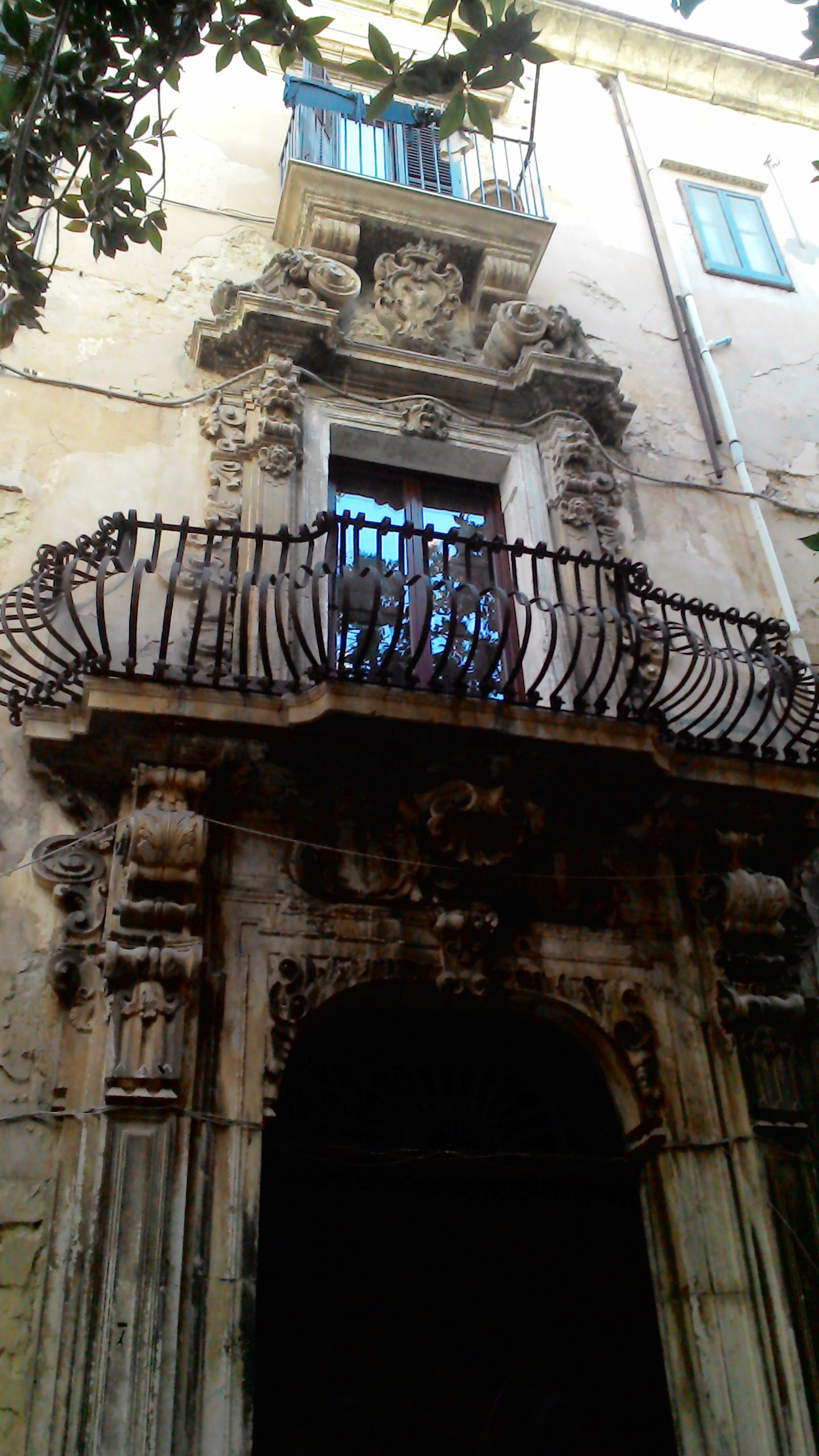
- Interactive map of the Palazzo Fraccia area

General information
- Architectural style: Baroque
- Location: Alcamo, Italy
- Coordinates: 37°58′50″N 12°57′56″E
- Construction started: 1700
- Client: Agostino Fraccia

Palazzo Fraccia is a palace in the town centre of Alcamo, in the province of Trapani.

== History ==
This palace was built by Agostino Fraccia, baron of Favarotta and Furni since 1697, in order to have a mansion fitting to the new social position he had acquired from his noble family; it can certainly be considered one of the most beautiful civil buildings built in the 18th century in Alcamo.

== Description ==
On the Baroque style façade there are eight entrances on the ground floor: the central one is full of decorations; the portal, made with travertine, owing to the restoration of the road, has a raised bottom with simple pedestals, two capitals and a lowered arch (finely decorated at its arrises), surmounted by two brackets with leaf and fruit decorations, supporting the balcony of honour.

The portal of the balcony is also rich with baroque decorations, with two pilasters, other garnitures on both sides, ending with three masks, the biggest one in the middle; the family emblem dominates the tympanum: it is formed by a heart confixed by an arrow and surmounted by the baronial crown.

The other five balconies on the first floor are made with carved stone; the brackets are fluted and have some decorations; on the second floor there are five stone balconies, two windows and two recent balconies.

As soon as you enter the lobby, there is an atrium: today, of the two ancient staircases, there is only the one leading to the first floor; in the late 19th century they built another staircase leading up to the second floor.

The palace is situated between the Church of Saint Nicholas of Bari (along corso 6 Aprile) and via Porta Stella, where there are two other entrances on the first floor, leading to its eight rooms with accessories, and to the ten rooms existing on the second floor.

The terrace dominates the Church, with a recent balcony which was added in the last century; during the 1950s the building has changed its ownership from the marquess Patti di Santa Rosalia to the families Manno, La Colla, Lucchese and Ippolito.

== See also ==
- Church of Saint Nicholas of Bari (Alcamo)
- Palazzo Pastore
- Villa Luisa

== See also ==
- Palazzo De Ballis
- Palazzo Pastore (Alcamo)
- Villa Luisa (Alcamo)

== Sources ==
- Pietro Francesco Mistretta: Il Vespro, Alcamo 24 marzo 1977
- "Palazzo Fraccia".
- Roberto Calia: I Palazzi dell'aristocrazia e della borghesia alcamese; Alcamo, Carrubba, 1997
- P.M. Rocca: di alcuni antichi edifici di Alcamo; Palermo, tip. Castellana-Di Stefano, 1905
- Giuseppe Polizzi: I monumenti di antichità e d'arte della provincia di Trapani; Trapani, Giovanni Modica Romano, 1879, p. 61
