= Palazzo Rossotti-Chiarelli =

Building in Alcamo, Italy

Palazzo Rossotti
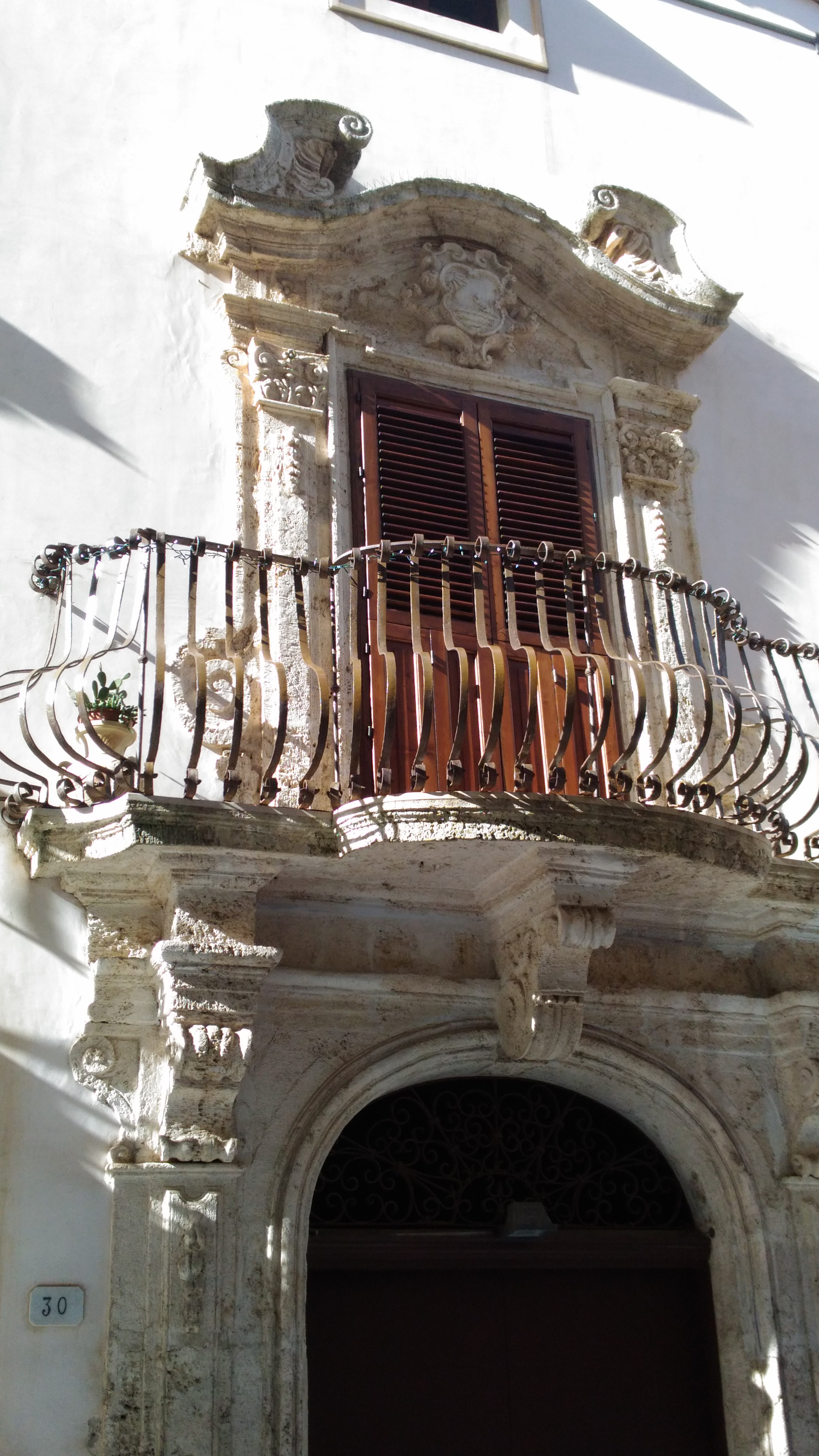
- Interactive map of the Palazzo Rossotti area

General information
- Location: Alcamo, Italy
- Coordinates: 37°58′54″N 12°58′00″E
- Construction started: 18th century
- Client: Rossotti-Chiarelli family

Palazzo Rossotti-Chiarelli, dating back to the 18th century, is located in via Rossotti in Alcamo, in the province of Trapani. It is in via Rossotti: in the same street you can also visit the Chiesa del Santissimo Salvatore(o Badia Grande).

== Description ==
The façade, in baroque style, has five windows and seven secondary entrances on the ground floor, that are part of some houses, and the main one which is very fine. On the first floor, apart three windows with brackets and a stone fronton, there are five balconies with brackets and galleries made with carved stone.

The main balconies are very imposing, with galleries realized with carved stone, and an iron convex railing; the doors of the balconies look very elegant too, with flowery elements, Corinthian capitals surmounted by an architrave and by the family's coat of arms, represented by a shield with undulating lines, overcome by a crowned lion rampant, turning towards the rising sun. On its upper part there is a medallion with a woman's figure of in relief. There are some doors and windows in via Tenente De Blasi Chiarelli and via Madonna dell'Alto.

Until the end of the 20th century, this palace has been the Rossotti's residence, then it was inherited by the Chiarelli family. Today it belongs to the families Settipani and Amato.

== See also ==
- Casa De Ballis
- Palazzo Pastore (Alcamo)
- Villa Luisa (Alcamo)

== Sources ==
- Roberto Calia: I Palazzi dell'aristocrazia e della borghesia alcamese; Alcamo, Carrubba, 1997
- P.M. Rocca: di alcuni antichi edifici di Alcamo; Palermo, tip. Castellana-Di Stefano, 1905
- Giuseppe Polizzi: I monumenti di antichità e d'arte della provincia di Trapani; Trapani, Giovanni Modica Romano, 1879
