= Spirito Santo, Alcamo =

Church building in Alcamo, Italy

Spirito Santo
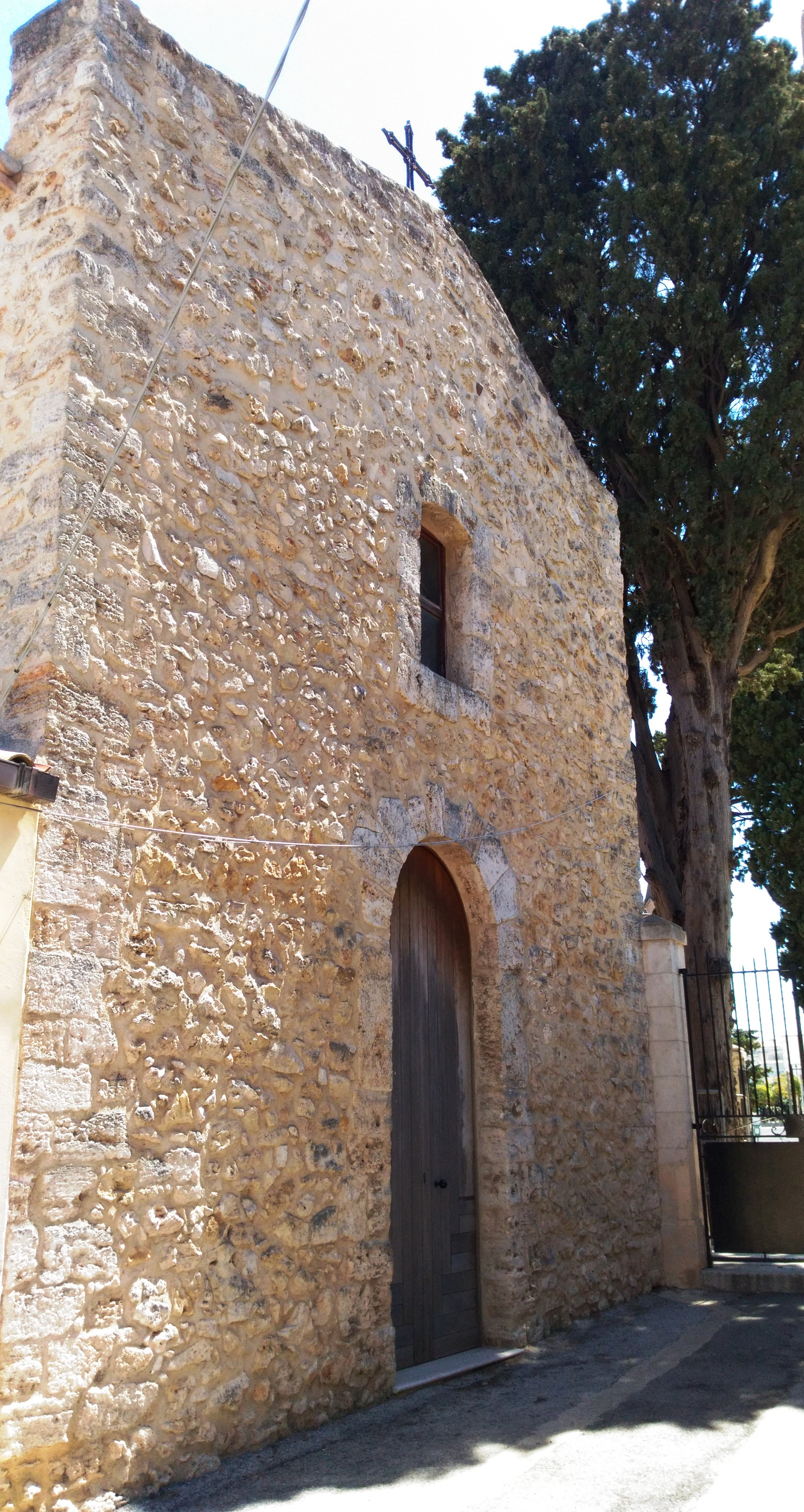
- The façade of the building

Religion
- Affiliation: Catholic
- Province: province of Trapani
- Region: Sicily
- Rite: Catholic
- Patron: The Holy Spirit

Location
- Location: Alcamo, province of Trapani, Italy
- Municipality: Alcamo
- State: Italy
- Interactive map of Spirito Santo
- Territory: Alcamo
- Coordinates: 37°59′14″N 12°57′49″E

Architecture
- Groundbreaking: 15th century

Spirito Santo ('Holy Spirit') is a Catholic church located in Alcamo, in the province of Trapani, Sicily.

== History ==
Documentation of the church's existence dates back to May 11, 1491, among the deeds of the notary Giacomo Gruppuso of Alcamo. The church is on an isolated plot of land that is full of trees, and managed by the Rectors of the Confraternity of the Annunciation.

In his work Discorso storico della opulenta città di Alcamo, the historian Ignazio De Blasi mentions a bill of sale concerning an enclosure in the districts of San Giovanni and Sant'Angelo, dated November 20, 1593, and a land concession dated August 17, 1549, among the deeds of the municipality of that period.

The shape of the building, the tempera painting, and the main areas exposed to the west, as in the nearby chapel of San Giovanni Battista, indicate that it was built in the same period.

In the 16th century, it was known as The Church of Saint Angel, because inside it there were temperas of Saint Michael and of the Guardian Angel. Its present name takes inspiration from the other homonym fresco on its vault. In the mid-1700s, the church was restored by a priest named Father Adragna. Other works were done in later periods.

De Blasi confirms this supposition regarding the name and believes that it was named Church of Saint Angel, because, the same as in the nearby Church of San Giovanni, the figure of this patron saint was placed on the right side of the tribune.

Once the church was administered by its chaplain, that is, a beneficiary, elected by the Bishop of Mazara del Vallo. Today it is opened only on Pentecost Sunday and on the second of November.

== Pentecost ==
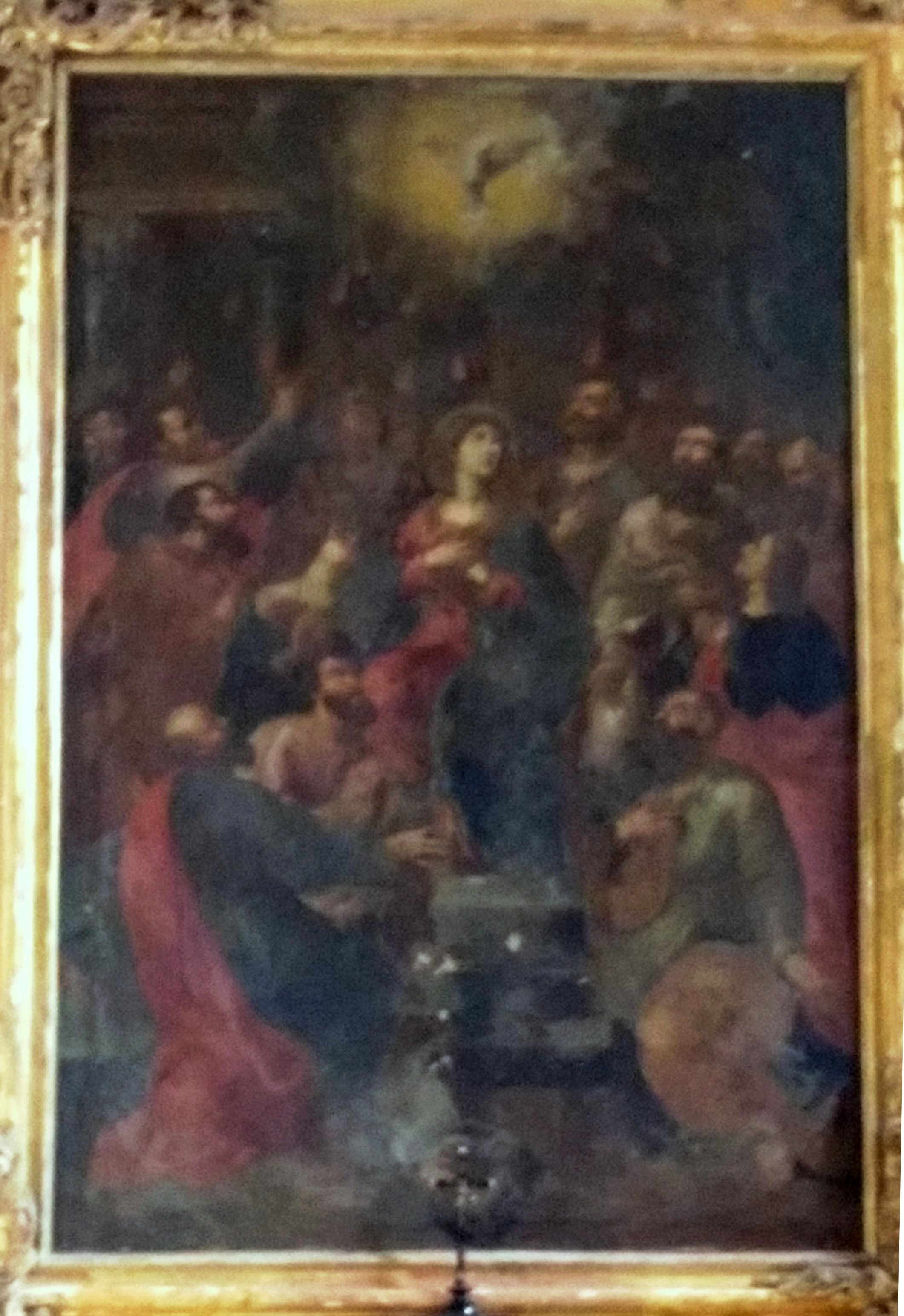
Pentecost, painted by Mario Giambona (1703)

Besides the frescoes representing the two angels and the one on the vault depicting the Holy Ghost in the shape of a dove, there is a painting made by Mario Giambona, a painter from Trapani, on the altar; at first, this work, representing the Pentecost, was intended for the chapel of the hospital of Alcamo.

The painting titled Pentecost is linked to the last period of the school of Pietro Novelli: in fact, initially the painting had been assigned to Giacomo Lo Verso, one of Novelli’s apprentices.

In the painting the characters are placed on the Virgin’s sides, almost in a circle, reflecting the importance of form in Novelli's works, similarly to the apostles in the painting which represents Saint Matthias’s election, kept inside the Church of Capuchins in Leonforte.

== Sources ==
- Cataldo, Carlo (1982). Guida storico-artistica dei Beni Culturali di Alcamo-Calatafimi-Castellammare del Golfo-Salemi-Vita. Alcamo: Sarograf.
- Bembina, G.B. (1956). Alcamo sacra; with notes by P. M. Rocca, reviewed and enlarged by Francesco Maria Mirabella. Alcamo: Accademia di studi Cielo d'Alcamo.
- La Sicilia e l'Immacolata. Non solo 150 anni. A cura di Diego Ciccarelli e Marisa Dora Valenza. Palermo: Biblioteca Francescana, officina di studi medievali. 2006.

== See also ==
- Pietro Maria Rocca
- Ignazio De Blasi
- Francesco Maria Mirabella
