= Palazzo Rocca (Alcamo) =

Building in Alcamo, Italy

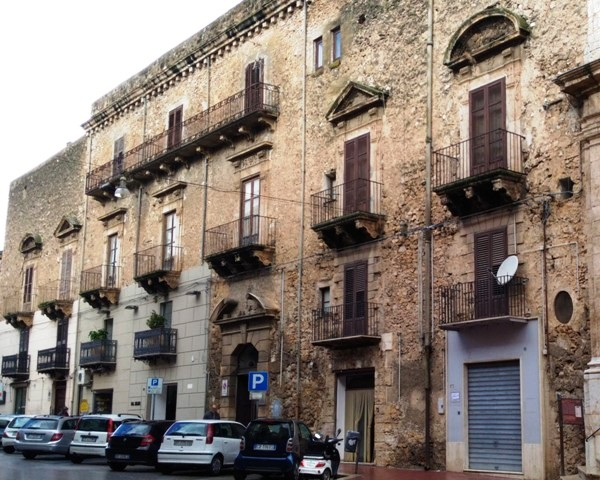
- Interactive map of the Palazzo Rocca area

General information
- Location: Alcamo, Italy
- Coordinates: 37°58′51″N 12°57′42″E
- Construction started: 1629
- Client: Rocca family

Palazzo Rocca is a civil building located in Alcamo, in the province of Trapani.

== History ==
This imposing palace was built in 1629 by the nobleman Salvatore Rocca and was completed by Vincenzo Rocca. It is considered one of the most important buildings in Alcamo. Today, part of it is used as a clergy house of the Church of Saints Paul and Bartholomew and orphanage, and another part as a residential building.

=== Description ===
The façade, still intact, is made with pieces of ceramics and has corbels and portals of carved stone. On the ground floor there are four shops and three more doors. The main one has a portal realized with very solid limestone travertinoide. Above it is a smooth pediment, some cornices and an open tympanum ending with two volutes.

Above the ground floor is a mezzanine floor with six small balconies having marble corbels and a wrought iron railing. On the first floor there are two balconies with stone galleries and corbels. On the second floor there is a long balcony, with stone galleries and corbels, and a wrought iron railing. Finally, the façade is surmounted by a denticulated eave.

From the gate in the northern part of the building one can enter a magnificent garden, about 1,500 square metres large. Inside are palms, lemons, oranges, cedars of Lebanon trees and two fountains; one has an octagonal shape, with an iron dome in the middle of it. The other one is round and has small columns supporting an iron dome.

The main entrance leads into a large hall. On the left is a small front door leading to the premises of the clergy house of the Chiesa dei Santi Paolo e Bartolomeo, a gate to the sacristy through a corridor, and a front door leading to the Orphanage Sant'Antonio, with its premises on the first and second floor.

From the southern side one can enter a mezzanine belonging to the Amodeo family, and a second floor of the Coraci family. On the left of the hall is a room which was used as a stable, and another entrance with an arch leading to a flat belonging to the families Benenati-Amodeo, with eight rooms and various accessories.

The premises of the building have undergone different changes, so some frescoes, ancient tiles and stone portals have been lost.

== See also ==
- Villa Luisa
- Palazzo Pastore
- Palazzo De Ballis

== Sources ==
- "Chiese e monumenti". Archived from the original on 2016-04-03.
- "Descrizione della chiesa".
- Gian Battista Bembina: Storia ragionata di Alcamo, manoscritto presso la Biblioteca Civica di Alcamo, in appendice
- Roberto Calia: I Palazzi dell'aristocrazia e della borghesia alcamese; Alcamo, Carrubba, 1997
- P.M. Rocca: Di alcuni antichi edifici di Alcamo; Palermo, tip. Castellana-Di Stefano, 1905
