= Palazzo Palmerini =

Building in Alcamo, Italy

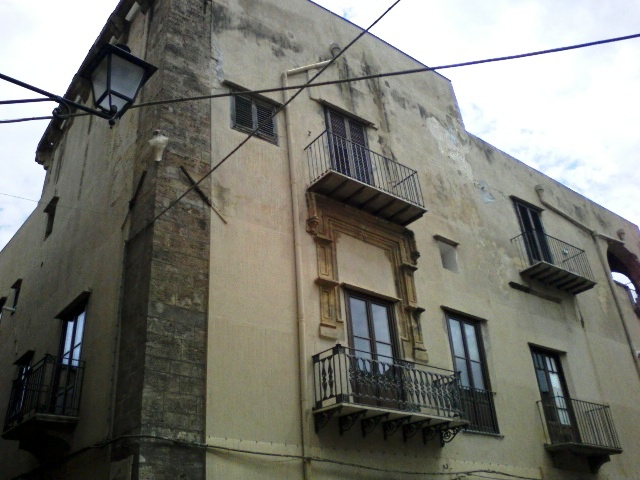
- The façade
- Interactive map of the Palazzo Palmerini area

General information
- Architectural style: Renaissance
- Location: Alcamo, Italy
- Coordinates: 37°58′53″N 12°57′58″E
- Completed: 18th century

Palazzo Palmerini (formerly Mastrandrea) is a 16th-century civic building located in Alcamo, in the province of Trapani: the Palace is situated at Via Buonarroti.

== History ==
The ownership of this mansion to the Mastrandrea family is deduced from the deed drawn by the notary Aversa on 16 June 1562. The historian Pietro Maria Rocca, from Alcamo, mentions some notarial contracts, between 1533 and 1534, which testify that the tower was built in this period. After the Mastrandreas, the owners were the Tornamiras, and finally the Palmerinis.

=== Description ===
The building dates back to the late Middle Ages. It has a battlement tower and was built for the prestige of the family that built it. The tower, with corbels at Machicoulis (as in the architecture of the time), is located at the corner between Via Buonarroti and Via Madonna dell'Alto; the corner, made with ashlars on which the coat of arms (represented by a shield with the shape of a horse head with a stripe in the middle of it, surmounted by a star) is placed, is a particular one.

On the ground floor of via Buonarroti there are three entrances: one is a round arch; there are two windows on its sides. On the first floor are a window and two balconies with stone corbels, and a recent one with a marble gallery which is sustained by iron supports. Its portal is 16th century in style.

As the historian Francesco Maria Mirabella affirms, after the Jesuits came back to Alcamo in 1806, the Municipality had to give the Collegio back to them, and then decided to rent the palace of Mastrandreas, that belonged to signor Benedetto Palmerini at that time. Between 1835 and 1841 the building was divided into different parts by the owner, signora Orofino Palmerini, and leased to four families simultaneously.

== Sources ==
- Roberto Calia: I Palazzi dell'aristocrazia e della borghesia alcamese; Alcamo, Carrubba, 1997
- P.M. Rocca: Di alcuni antichi edifici di Alcamo; Palermo, tip. Castellana-Di Stefano, 1905
- Giuseppe Polizzi: I monumenti di antichità e d'arte della provincia di Trapani; Trapani, Giovanni Modica Romano, 1879
- Francesco Maria Mirabella: Alcamensia noterelle storiche con appendice di Documenti inediti p. 28; Alcamo, ed. Sarograf, 1931

== See also ==
- Palazzo De Ballis
- Alcamo
- Pietro Maria Rocca
