= House of Ciullo d'Alcamo =

Historic building in Alcamo, Italy

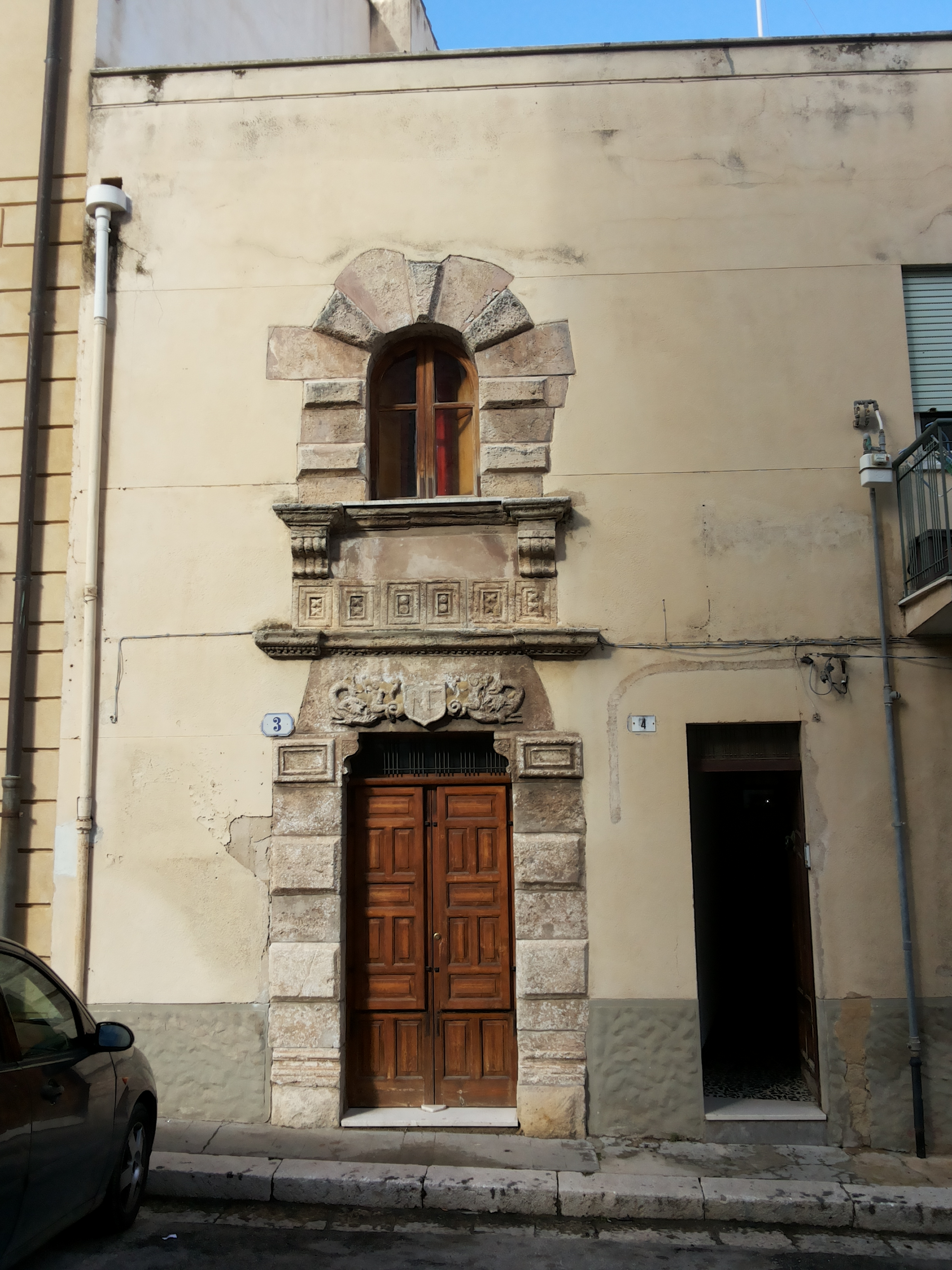
- Alleged house of Ciullo d’Alcamo

General information
- Location: Alcamo, Italy
- Completed: 16th century

The House of Ciullo d'Alcamo is a residential building located in the town centre of Alcamo, in the province of Trapani, Italy.

== History ==
The popular tradition assigns the property of this house to the poet Ciullo d'Alcamo; it is not easy to understand where this hearsay came from. Actually, they first tell about this house, which has nothing to do with Ciullo d'Alcamo, in 1854 in a list of sites of historical interest, belonging to the municipality of Alcamo, now missing.

It does not have any architectural characteristics of the 13th century, the period in which the poet lived, and who, more probably, was born in the old town set on Mount Bonifato and called Longaricum, rather than in the present town of Alcamo.

In 1892 Francesco Maria Mirabella, a historian from Alcamo, asserted that the portal was to be assigned to the end of the 16th century, later than the poet’s period.

Today it belongs to the Lombardo family, who have restored the interior part, leaving both the portal and the window untouched.

== Description ==
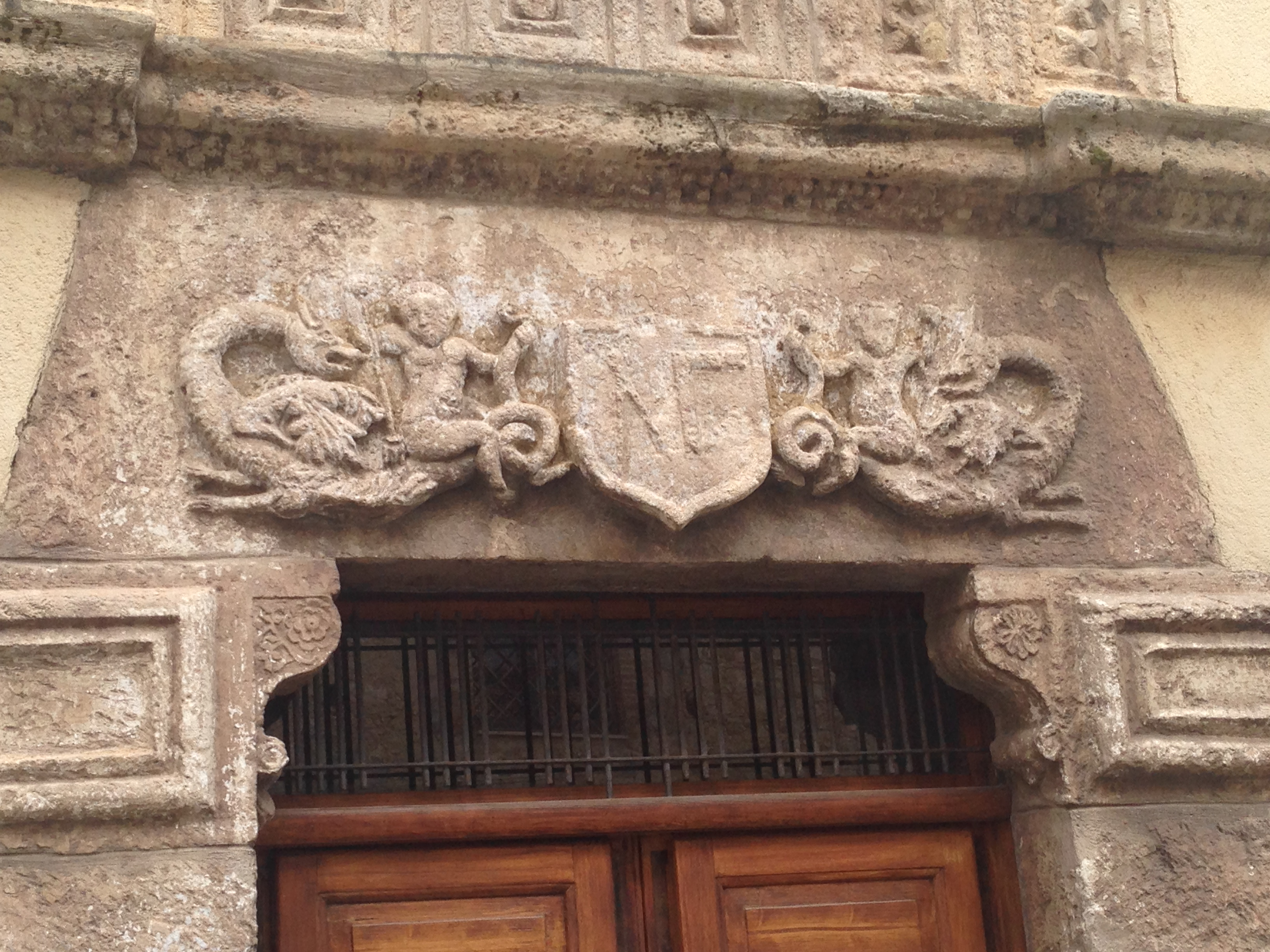
Detail of the portal

The characteristic elements of the façade are the portal and the window with circular arc above it: they both are realized with limestone travertinoide.

Above the portal there is a decoration in high relief, with a compass and a delineator in its middle, between two big drakes ridden by two small angels with a trident in their hands.

== See also ==
- Cielo d'Alcamo

== Sources ==
- Roberto Calia: I Palazzi dell'aristocrazia e della borghesia alcamese; Alcamo, Carrubba, 1997
- Carlo Cataldo-Benedetto Barranca: Cielo e il contrasto sul suo monumento;Alcamo, Sarograf, 1996
- Carlo Cataldo: Guida storico-artistica dei beni culturali di Alcamo, Calatafimi, Castellammare del Golfo, Salemi e Vita, Sarograf-Alcamo (1982)
- P.M. Rocca: di alcuni antichi edifici di Alcamo; Palermo, tip. Castellana-Di Stefano, 1905
- Giuseppe Polizzi: I monumenti di antichità e d'arte della provincia di Trapani; Trapani, Giovanni Modica Romano, 1879, p. 61
