= Villa Luisa (Alcamo) =

Mansion in Italy

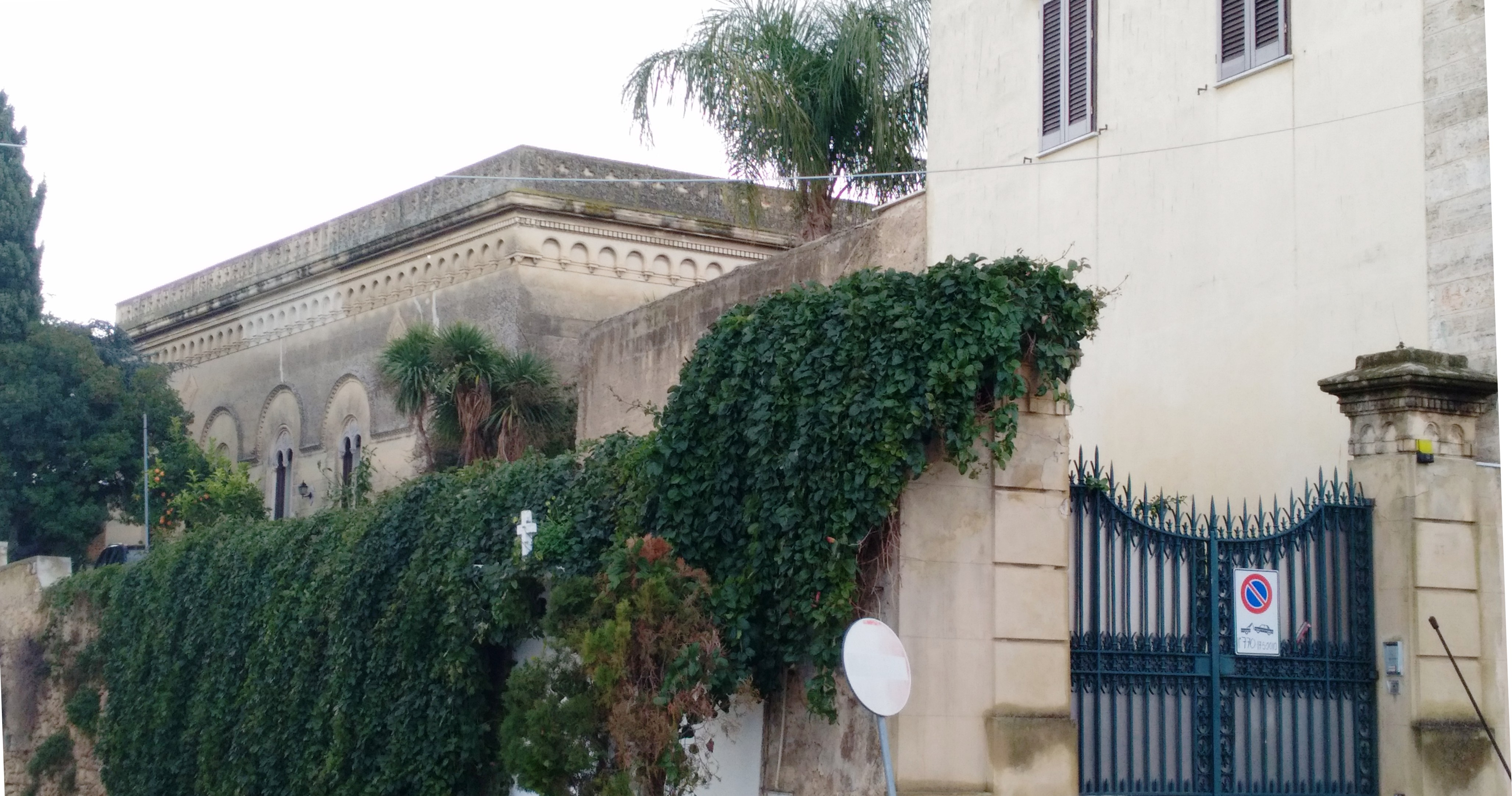
- Interactive map of the Villa Luisa area

General information
- Architectural style: Liberty
- Location: Alcamo, Italy
- Coordinates: 37°58′57″N 12°58′02″E
- Construction started: 1903
- Client: Stefano Chiarelli Peria

Technical details
- Size: 350 square metres

Design and construction
- Engineer: Francesco Naselli

Villa Luisa is a mansion located in the town centre of Alcamo, in the province of Trapani.

== History ==
It is an elegant villa probably built in 1903 in Liberty style; it took the name of his owner’s wife, Stefano Chiarelli Peria. It is situated in Alcamo, a town rich with ancient buildings and beautiful churches. We do not know the name of the architect who planned it, but it is very similar to Villa Paino in Palermo, also belonging to the family Chiarelli Rossotti, and whose plan is assigned to the engineer Francesco Naselli of Ernesto Basile school.

The mansion has been used as a dance hall and for wedding parties in the 1970s, then as a nursery school in the 1980s.

Today, after the restoration made in 1980, it has become a refined household, with trees of different types, and multicoloured flowers: a real peaceful haven.

=== Description ===
The building has a fine Liberty style tending towards Moorish; with only one raised floor, it is 350 square metres large, with a magnificent garden enriched by fountains and elegant seats. On the main façade (still surmounted by the owner’s coat of arms and his initials) there is a big balcony with a fine marble parapet, with some carvings with the shape of a Greek cross, and five artistic openings. There are 14 rooms, with the ballroom, about 110 square metres large, in the middle of them.

After the restoration made in 1980 (made according to the project of the architects Valeria De Folly, Dannis and Carlo Bruschi), this room has become a more functional space, like a corner rich with different plants, well-lighted by a large skylight and a big white chandelier made of Murano glass dated 1943.

The furniture is very appropriate, as they have maintained the family’s one, dating back to the early 1900s; there are also two beautiful fireplaces of grey marble, the first is located in the hall and the other in the main bedroom. That one in the hall has geometrical patterns, with the coat of arms of the barons Rossotti Chiarelli, surmounted by a baronial crown. The second fireplace has floral arrangements, with the family crest in the middle of it.

== Sources ==
- Roberto Calia: I Palazzi dell'aristocrazia e della borghesia alcamese; Alcamo, Carrubba, 1997
- P.M. Rocca: di alcuni antichi edifici di Alcamo; Palermo, tip. Castellana-Di Stefano, 1905

== See also ==
- House of Ciullo d'Alcamo
- Palazzo Pastore (Alcamo)
- Palazzo De Ballis
- Palazzo Rocca (Alcamo)
