= San Nicolò di Bari, Alcamo =

Church building in Alcamo, Italy

San Nicolò di Bari
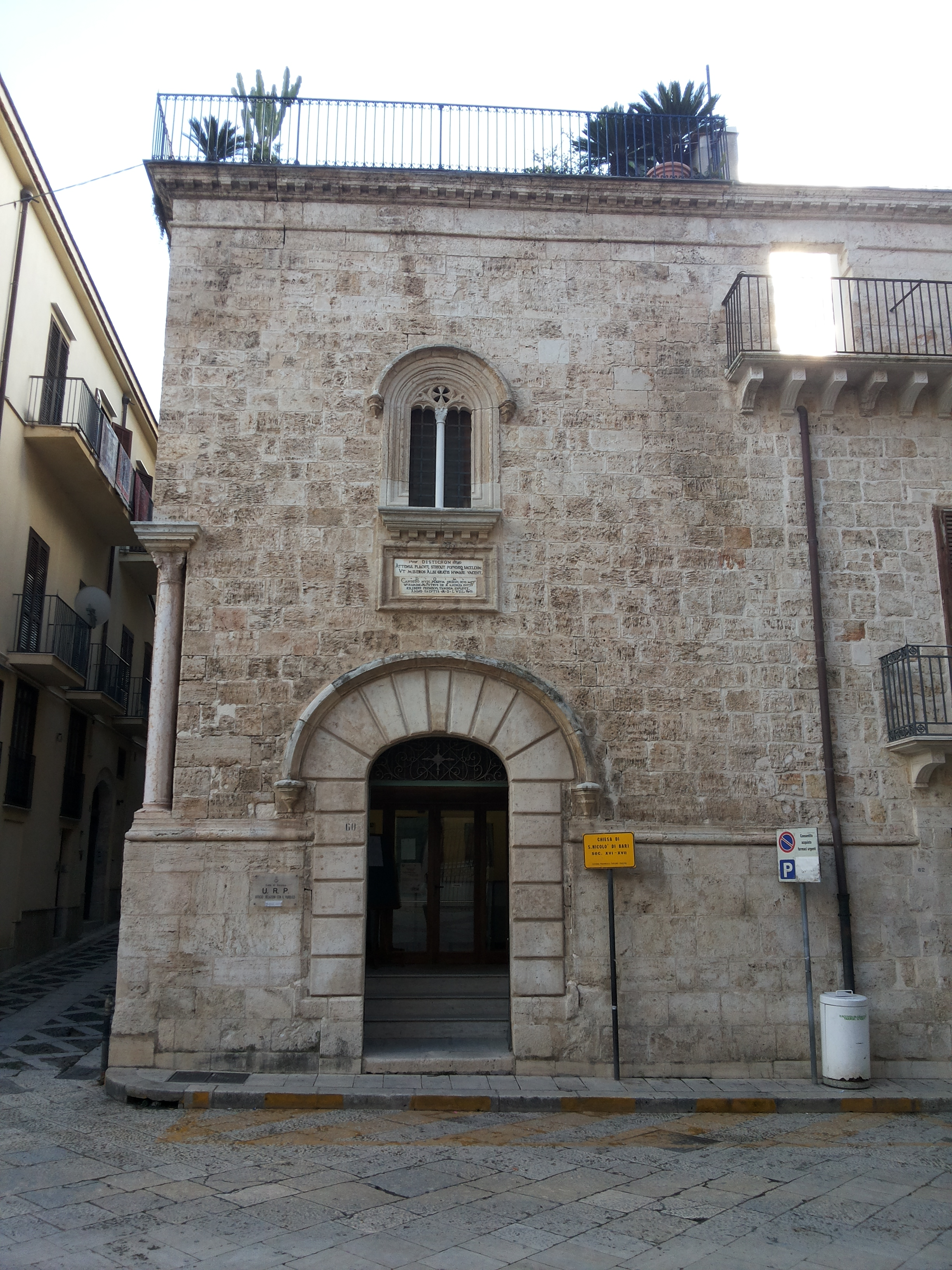
- The façade

Religion
- Affiliation: Catholic
- Province: province of Trapani
- Region: Sicily

Location
- Location: Alcamo, province of Trapani, Italy
- Municipality: Alcamo
- State: Italy
- Interactive map of San Nicolò di Bari
- Territory: Alcamo
- Coordinates: 37°58′51″N 12°57′20″E

Architecture
- Architect: Girolamo Vicchiuzzo
- Founder: Pietro Mastrandrea,
- Groundbreaking: 1558

San Nicolò di Bari is a deconsecrated Roman Catholic church, built in a Romanesque, early Renaissance-style located in the town of Alcamo, in the province of Trapani on the island of Sicily, Italy.

== History ==
By 1430 a church with this name already existed in Alcamo, under the patronage of the Liotta family. In 1558, Nicolò di Gregorio, a member of the Liotta, authorized Pietro Mastrandrea, the Rector of the Confraternity of Bianchi, to demolish the ancient Church and build the present one.

Since 1896, after the dissolution of the company, the Church hosted the seat of Monte di Prestiti "Filippi" (banking house) from the Congregation of Charity, which destroyed the altar in order to put a safe there. Deconsecrated since the middle of last century, today the Church is the seat of URP (Public Information Office) and the Tourist office.

== Description and works ==
The facade has some archaic elements, including a double lancet window ending with a denticulate cornice; it was completed and designed by Girolamo Vicchiuzzo, an architect and carver from Palermo. During the last century, a fake balcony was added; a finely carved small column stands at the corner of the façade. The interior has a single nave with two bays and a crossed vault: the former main altarpiece, now lost, depicted San Nicola di Bari painted in 1599 by Narciso Guidone, a painter from Trapani.

== Confraternity ==
Originally it was called Confraternity of Mercy and the Most Holy Crucifix, or the Mount of the Most Holy Charity: its founder was the nobleman Pietro Mastrandrea; after his death the Confraternity had the patronage on the Church, given by Nicolangelo de Gregorio in 1567. Afterwards it was called Compagnia dei Bianchi and was aggregated to the Arciconfraternity of San Giovanni Decollato, Rome ]; its brethren belonged to nobility and they wore "a white sackcloth and visors" with the emblem of the Most Holy Crucifix on their shoulders. The company had the following scopes and duties:

- Visiting the poor prisoners, striving for their release with the financial support of people too.
- Protecting the confessed criminals, comforting them before death, and bringing them to the burial place on their shoulders.
- Burying poor people, accompanying them with some priests.
- Visiting the poor sick people who were in hospital, helping them during meals and serving them with a spirit of charity.

The historian Ignazio de Blasi also speaks about the duty to help the poor sick people and look for a free burial place for them; in 1820 some of these possibilities were revoked to companies, and later, in 1898, they were definitely abolished by law. The financial incomes of this company were assigned to the families of prisoners and to ex-convicts as benefits.

== Sources ==
- Carlo Cataldo: Guida storico-artistica dei beni culturali di Alcamo-Calatafimi-Castellammare Golfo p. 61; Sarograf, Alcamo, 1982
- Carlo Cataldo: La conchiglia di S.Giacomo p. 85-86; Campo, Alcamo, 2001
- Carlo Cataldo: Il pane della libertà p. 17; Campo, Alcamo, 1999
