= Palazzo Pastore (Alcamo) =

Building in Alcamo, Italy

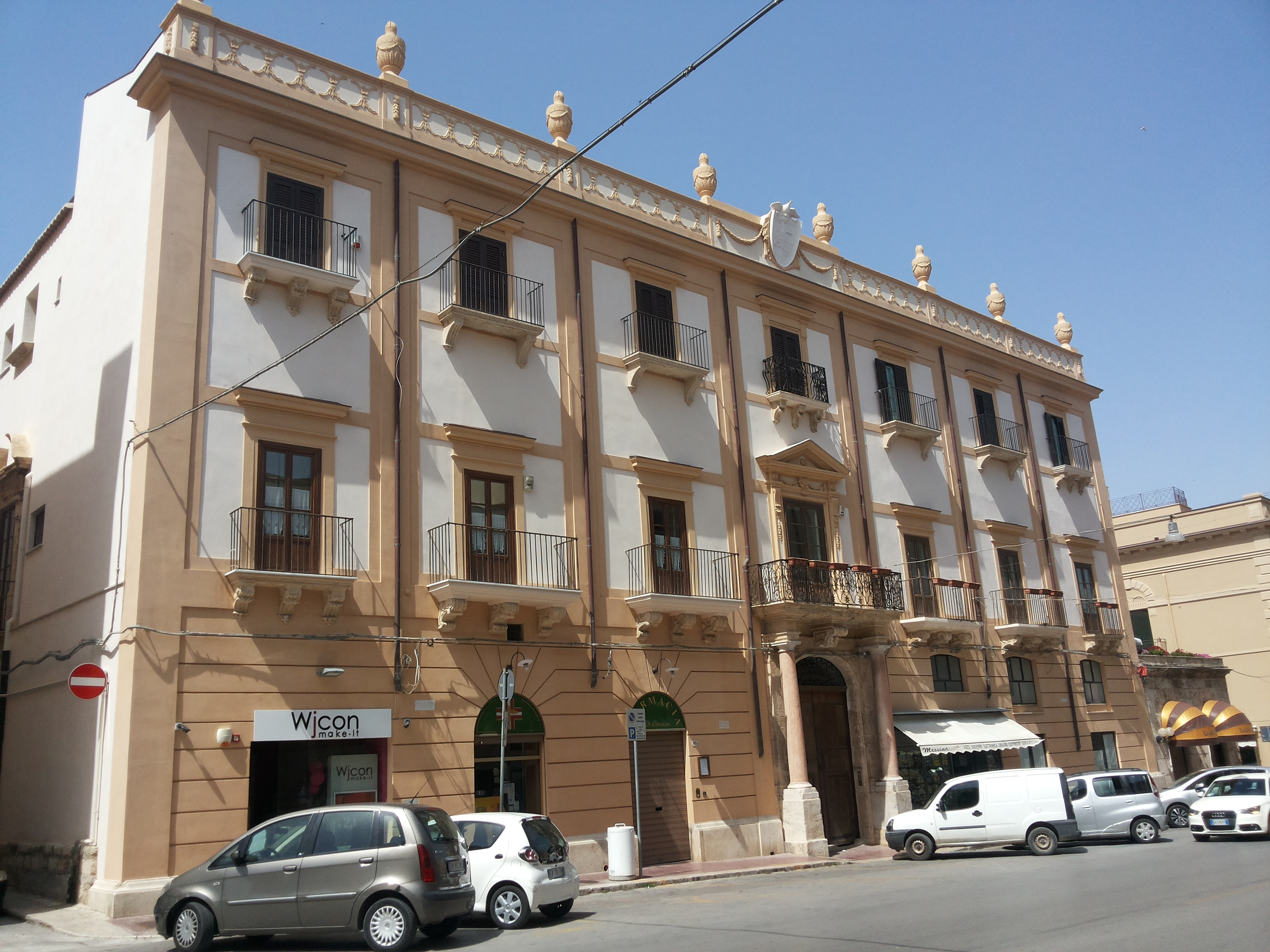
- The façade
- Interactive map of the Palazzo Pastore area

General information
- Architectural style: neoclassical
- Location: Alcamo, Italy
- Coordinates: 37°58′51″N 12°57′51″E
- Completed: 18th century

Palazzo Pastore is a civil building located in Alcamo, in the province of Trapani.

== Description ==
It is one of the best-known and most beautiful palaces in Alcamo; in neoclassical style, it was built at the end of the 18th century by the baron Nicolò Pastore, the first baron of Rincione and the father of the more famous Felice Pastore, politician and benefactor. Various noblemen and princes were hosted in this wonderful place over time.

The building has three floors and three internal courts, one of them very large; the façade has some structural parts similar to those of the Mother Church and other palaces. The entrance leading to the two stairs is imposing: on the northern side there are eight columns made with red marble and a ceiling with ribs, with four round arches leading to the two stairs and to the main court.

On the northern wall of the staircase there is a plaque which commemorates the stay of His Majesty Ferdinand I of the Two Sicilies in 1799. There is another entrance from via Cernaia, with two rooms used as a gatehouse and a stairway leading to the first floor, where there are 12 rooms and other accessories that were the servants’ quarters at one time.

== See also ==
- Casa De Ballis
- Palazzo Rossotti-Chiarelli
- Villa Luisa (Alcamo)

== Sources ==
- Roberto Calia: I Palazzi dell'aristocrazia e della borghesia alcamese; Alcamo, Carrubba, 1997
- P.M. Rocca: di alcuni antichi edifici di Alcamo; Palermo, tip. Castellana-Di Stefano, 1905
- Giuseppe Polizzi: I monumenti di antichità e d'arte della provincia di Trapani; Trapani, Giovanni Modica Romano, 1879, p. 61
