= Nino Navarra =

Italian poet and orator (1885–1917)

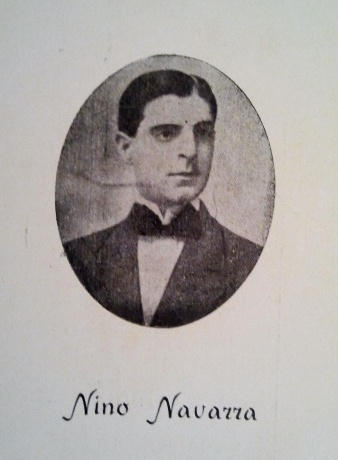
Nino Navarra

Nino Navarra (Alcamo, 1885 – Kars Plateau, 6 June 1917) was an Italian poet and orator.

== Biography ==
He was born from Leonard Navarra and Cecilia Triolo of the barons of Sant'Anna, and died during World War I in 1917, at the age of 32. He was an infantry second lieutenant who fell for his country and was awarded a Silver Medal of Military Valor.

At the age of twenty (in 1905), he published a collection of sonnets, entitled L'annunziazione, which easily brings back to the name of his model, Gabriele D'Annunzio. As he received several approvals for his compositions, Navarra left his home town to attend the Roman literary circles, where he met D'Annunzio, in the period when the poet was also successful with his dramatic works.

He collaborated with the Italian cultural magazine Scena illustrata and with the French periodical Eclair. In Paris, the poet acquired estimate for his oratorical skills which took him to give a series of lectures on literary subjects in Germany and Brazil, where he had the opportunity of sharing his lyrics that were very expressive and full of musicality now mobile and lithe, now slow and serious.

== Poetics ==
In his poetry, he sings the fullness of life:

we drink a scent in each flower

and every day we break a chain

and exalts the heroic action: tomorrow the hero will come, he will have silver weapons.

Navarra nostalgically remembers his domestic peace and the family affections in his youth, worries for loneliness and the premonition of a premature end.

In a little essay by the Academy Lo Frutto, dedicated to Navarra "a soldier poet" during the dedication of the homonymous junior high school in Alcamo in 1950, the literary critic professor Giuseppe Cottone said: Navarra's literary style following that of D’Annunzio, is all in the unlimited devotion to Beauty which was on top of his ideals. A follower of D’Annunzio, then, not so much for love of contemporaneity nor because he was D’Annunzio's friend, but for a natural and deep affinity of temperament.

Gozzano succeeded, so to say, to D'Annunzio, who Nino Navarra approaches for his Arcadian sentiment and for the cult of ancient Greece as the birthplace of spirit. In all his poems, there are the ideals and dreams of a twenty-year-old poet.

Navarra closes his first verse collection with a hope: Soul, be your Faith stronger than Time

(...) Soul, I throw you towards Life(...)

Now it is better that I prepare my future myself.

== Works ==
- Segesta, Alcamo, 1901
- Tra fiore e sogno, Alcamo, 1901
- Annunziazione, a collection of sonnets, published in Alcamo in 1905

== Sources ==
- Andrea Chiarelli e Dario Cocchiara:Alcamo nel XX secolo; ed. Campo; Alcamo, 2005
- Lo frutto, i 150 anni del Liceo Classico di Alcamo, a cura di Francesco Melia e Gaetano Stellino p. 80; ed. Campo; Alcamo, 2012
