= Santa Caterina del Monte di Pietà, Alcamo =

Church building in Alcamo, Italy

Saint Catherine of the Mount of Piety
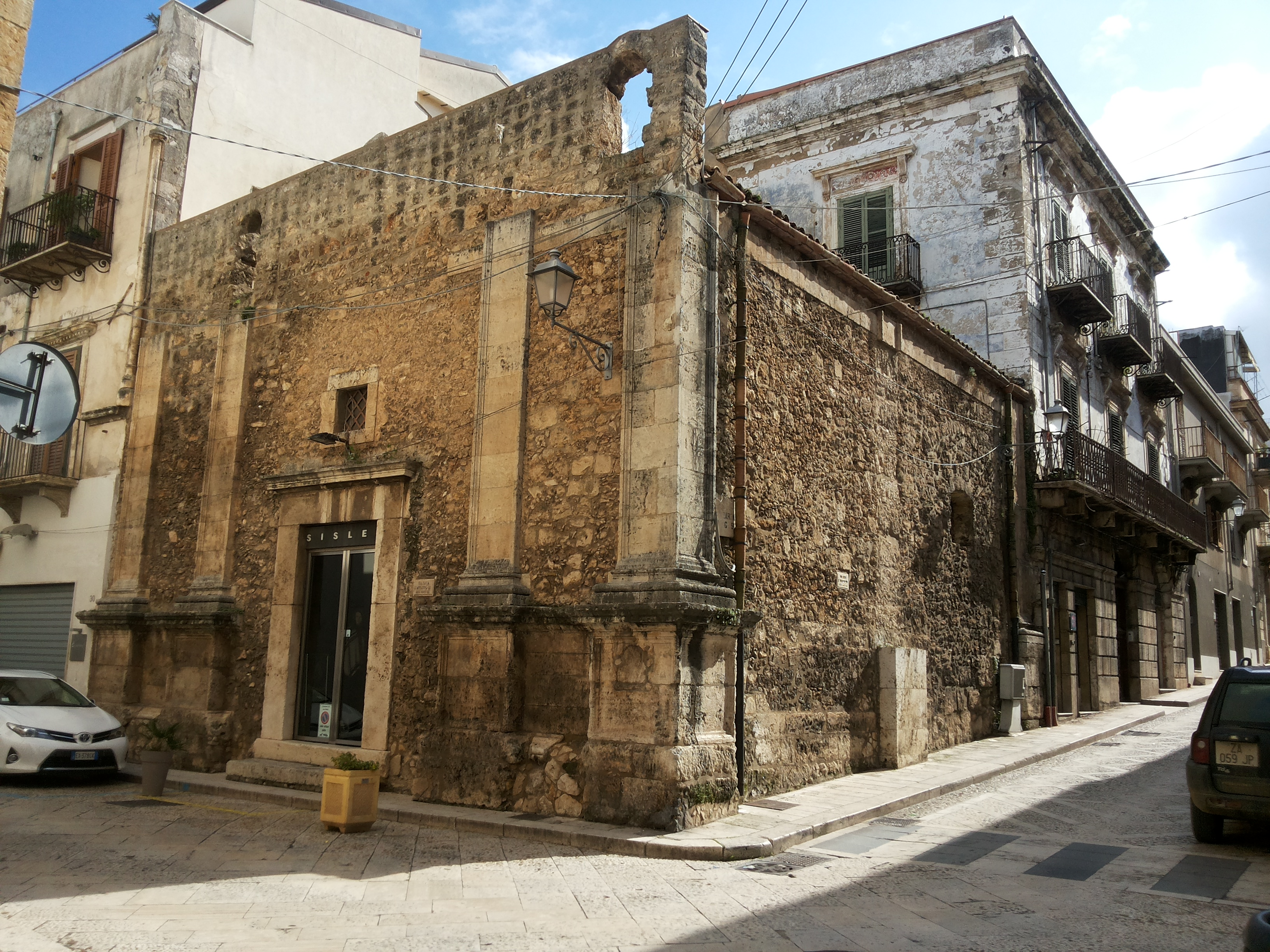
- The façade

Religion
- Province: province of Trapani
- Region: Sicily
- Rite: Catholic
- Patron: Saint Catherine of Alexandria

Location
- Location: Alcamo, province of Trapani, Italy
- Municipality: Alcamo
- State: Italy
- Interactive map of Saint Catherine of the Mount of Piety
- Territory: Alcamo
- Coordinates: 37°58′51″N 12°58′00″E

This article is a translation of the article it:Ex Chiesa di Santa Caterina del Monte di Pietà in the Italian Wikipedia.

Santa Caterina del Monte di Pietà ("Saint Catherine of the Mount of Piety") was a Catholic church in Alcamo, in the province of Trapani.

== History ==
The original church of this name was built in 1518 by the local Confraternity of the mount of piety (Confraternita del Santo Monte di Pietà) at the western side of the town's principal church. The confraternity's rectors decided to construct a new and better church on the main street, Corso 6 Aprile, opposite the present Church of the Holy Guardian Angel also known as the Church of the Riparate. (The Riparate [sheltered women] were those who, abandoning an immoral life, took shelter in an institution without becoming nuns: those who became religious sisters were known as Repentite.)

The church on Corso 6 Aprile owed its importance to being the seat of this confraternity, which assisted the poor in cases of need or illness. It has long been closed to worship and has been deconsecrated.

The confraternity's original church, which it abandoned, was in 1619 aggregated by the bishop of Mazara del Vallo to Holy Trinity Parish. It ended up being given in 1634 to the town's principal church for use as a courtyard leading to the sacristy.

== Description and works of art ==
The interior of the church had a single nave with paintings. One of the paintings, now in the Sacred Art Museum of the Basilica of Our Lady of the Assumption, is of Saint Catherine of Alexandria. It dates from 1621 and is attributed to Giuseppe Carrera or Giacomo Lo Verde.

The rather handsome façade with a simple portal and four noteworthy pilasters on tall bases is of 1608.

== The Confraternity ==
The Confraternity was already in existence in 1430 and had its seat in the town's principal church. Probably in 1635, the Confraternity of the Holy Mount of Piety became the Company of the Holy Mount of Piety (Compagnia del Santo Monte di Pietà).

The members of the Confraternity, "nobility and men of standing", wore as their ceremonial habit sackcloth, baize cloaks and dark grey felt hats and a badge representing Jesus in the tomb. After 1635, the members of the Company wore white sackcloth and visors, with the emblem of Our Lord of Piety on their backs.

Their duties were:

- to celebrate the feast of Saint Catherine of Alexandria on 25 November
- to help the poor with alms.
- to participate every Monday and during the octave of 2 November in Requiem Mass in Saint Catherine's Church for the dead
- on Holy Monday to go in procession with priests to the church of Saint Hippolytus for the victims of the 1575 plague who were buried there

This cemetery was given to the Confraternity in 1581 for them to build there to build a church dedicated to God and the Virgin Mary, and to the protectors from plague Saint Roch and Saint Sebastian.

The company was probably still active in 1924, but no longer exists.

== Sources ==
- Carlo Cataldo, Guida storico-artistica dei beni culturali di Alcamo-Calatafimi-Castellammare Golfo p. 61, Alcamo, Sarograf, 1982.
- Carlo Cataldo, La conchiglia di S.Giacomo p. 76, Alcamo, Campo, 2001.
