= Longaricum =

Ancient Roman city in Sicily

Longaricum was an ancient Roman city in Sicily. It was on the inland road from Lilybaeum (modern Marsala) to Panormus (modern Palermo). Its precise location is not known with certainty, but current scholarship locates it tentatively near Camporeale.
