= Santa Maria del Soccorso, Alcamo =

Church building in Alcamo, Italy

- Church of Saint Maria del Soccorso
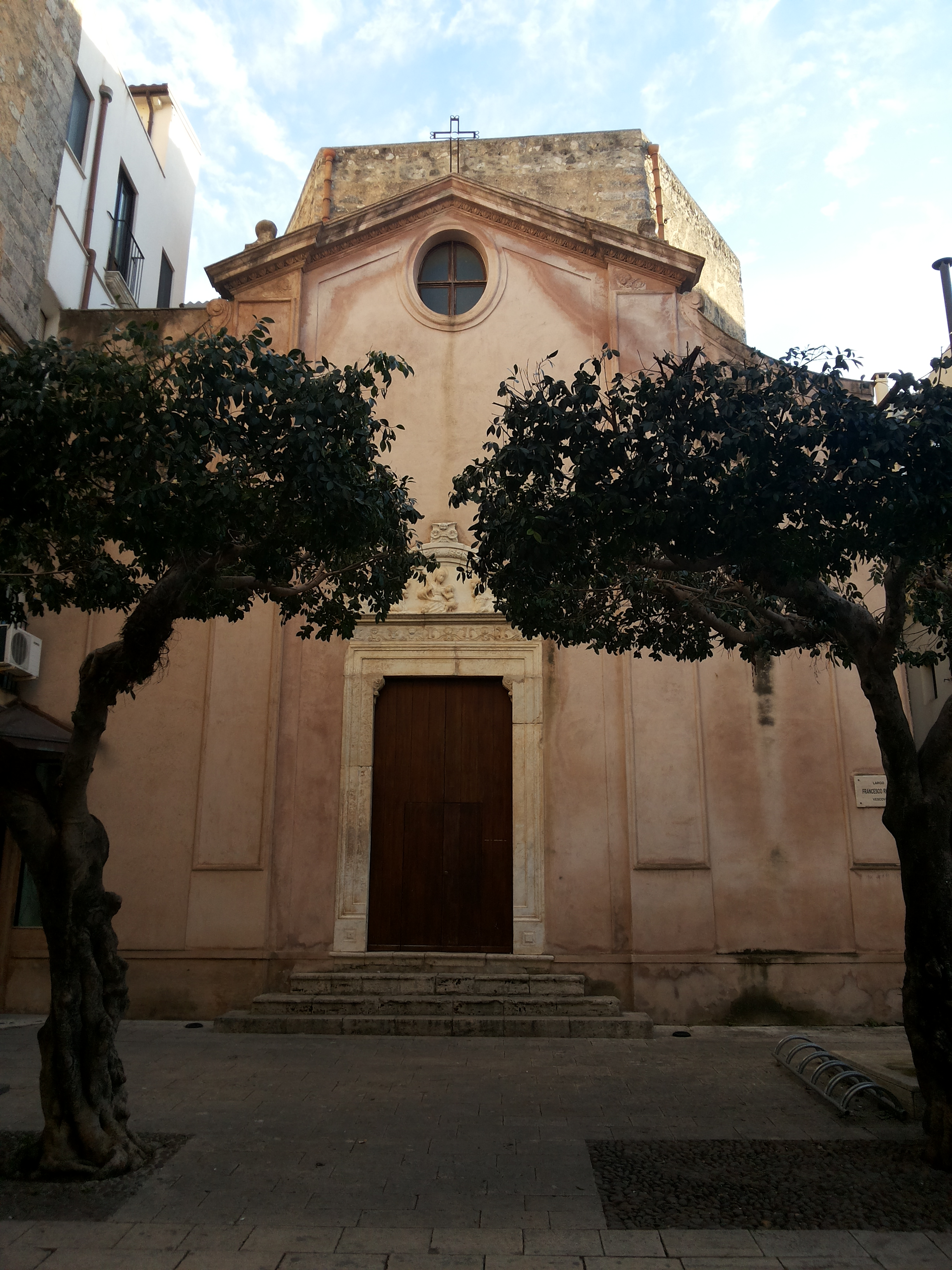
- The facade

Religion
- Province: Trapani
- Region: Sicily
- Rite: Catholic
- Patron: saint Maria del Soccorso (Help)

Location
- Location: Alcamo, Trapani, Italy
- Municipality: Alcamo
- State: Italy
- Interactive map of Santa Maria del Soccorso, Alcamo
- Territory: Alcamo
- Coordinates: 37°58′51″N 12°57′58″E

Architecture
- Funded by: merchants from Genoa
- Groundbreaking: 1738
- Completed: 1739

The ex Church of Saint Maria del Soccorso is a Catholic Church located in Alcamo, in the province of Trapani. Sicily, Italy.

== Description ==
Among the most ancient churches in Alcamo, it was probably founded in the 15th century by a merchants from Genoa, who were members of the confraternity dedicated to the veneration of Holy Mary's Help. It is situated in corso 6 Aprile, opposite the Mother Church. Originally it was in Gothic style, with a nave and two aisles, but its form became elliptical during the restoration made in 1739.

The interior is well balanced and full of stuccoes made by Nicolò Curti, brother of Lorenzo Curti who carved the wooden statue of Our Lady of Miracles. On the high altar, there is the 16th-century sculpture of Our Lady of Help (Madonna del Soccorso), realized by Bartolomeo Berrettaro.

In the most popular iconography the Virgin Mary is represented armed with a club while hitting a demon terrified at her feet.

The main portal, carved in white stone, with the impost and architrave with moldings, is surmounted by a lunette assigned to Berrettaro; it represents the image of Our Lady of Help among angels.

== Works ==
- Madonna del Soccorso (Our Lady of Help): probably a sculpture by Bartolomeo Berrettaro, modified by Giacomo Gagini in 1545: today in the Basilica
- Saint Carlo Borromeo, a 17th-century painting
- Saint Philip Neri, a painting made in 1637 by Francesco Minutilla, now kept inside the Sacred Art Museum
- The Holy Trinity (Santissima Trinità): a painting realized in 1925 by Francesco Alesi, a priest
- Saint Onuphrius: made also by Francesco Alesi.
- Our Lady of Graces (Madonna delle Grazie), a painting made by Giovan Leonardo Bagolino (Sebastiano Bagolino's father) in 1566. Today it is kept in the chapel of Our Lady of Fátima inside the Basilica.
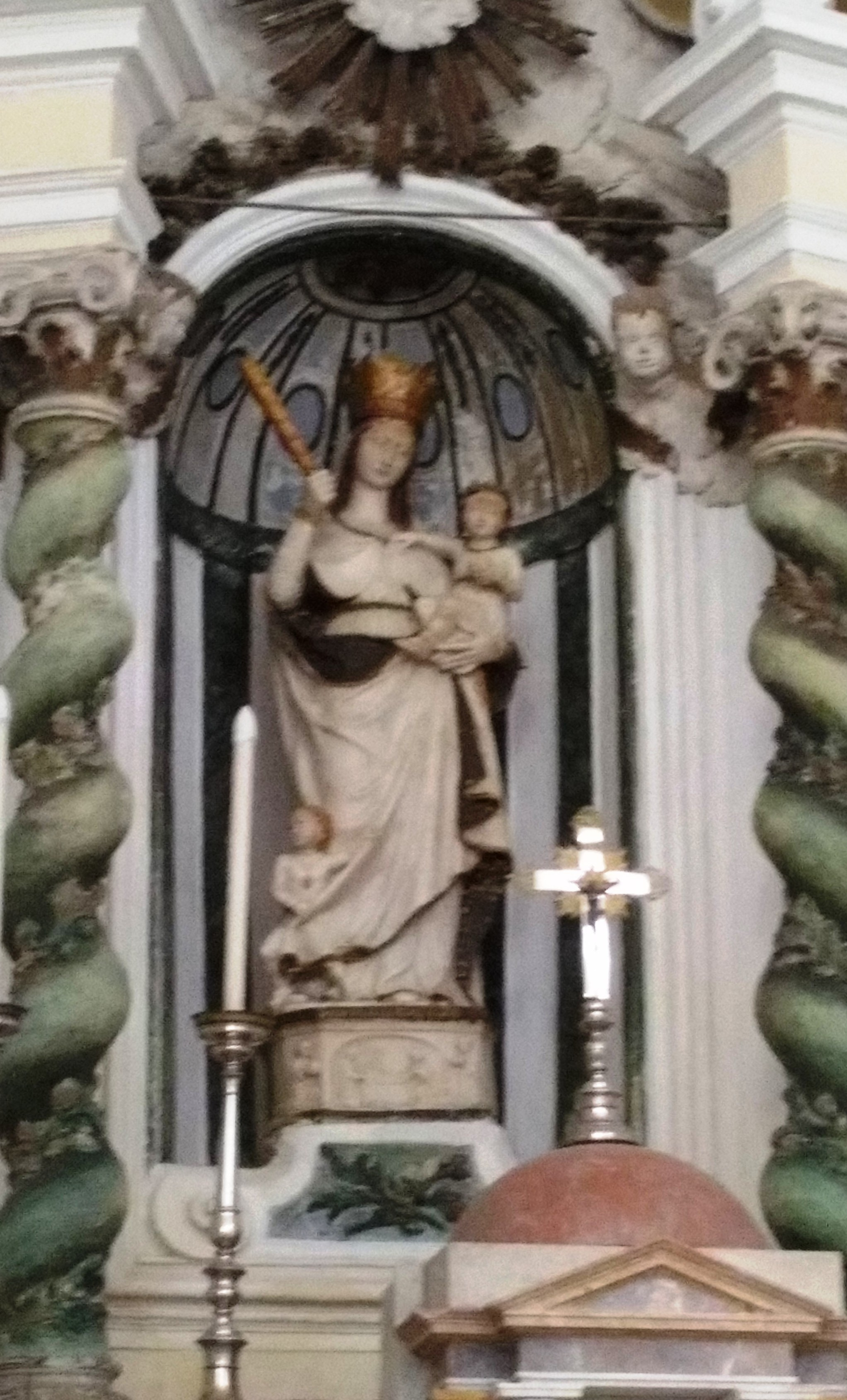
Statua in marmo di Bartolomeo Berrettaro, rifatta da Giacomo Gagini (1545)

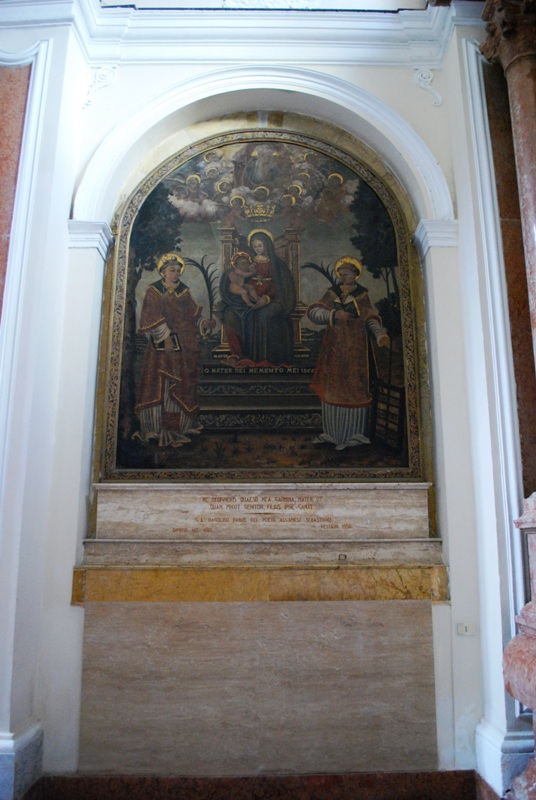
Our Lady of Graces, inside the Basilica

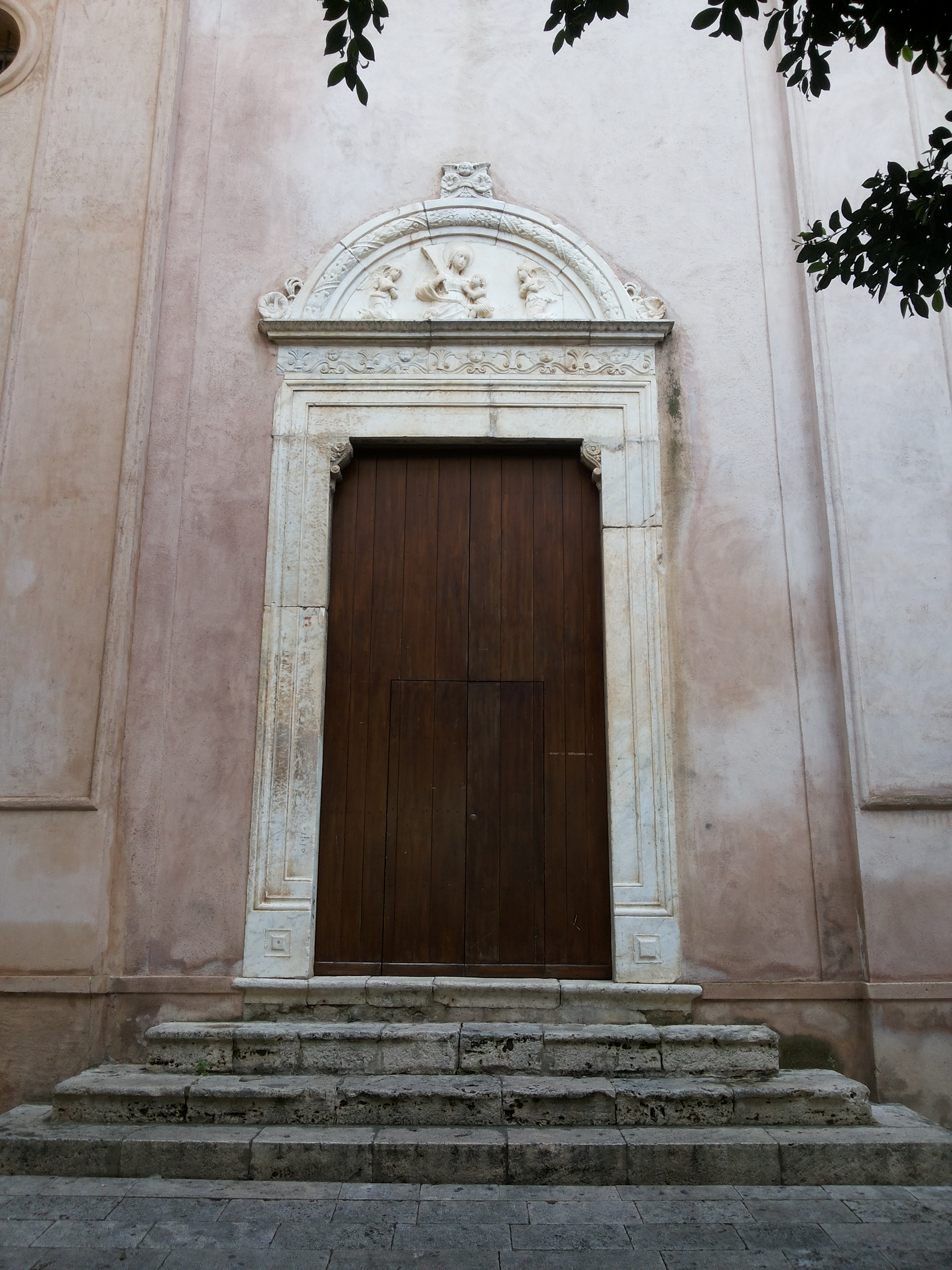
The church portal

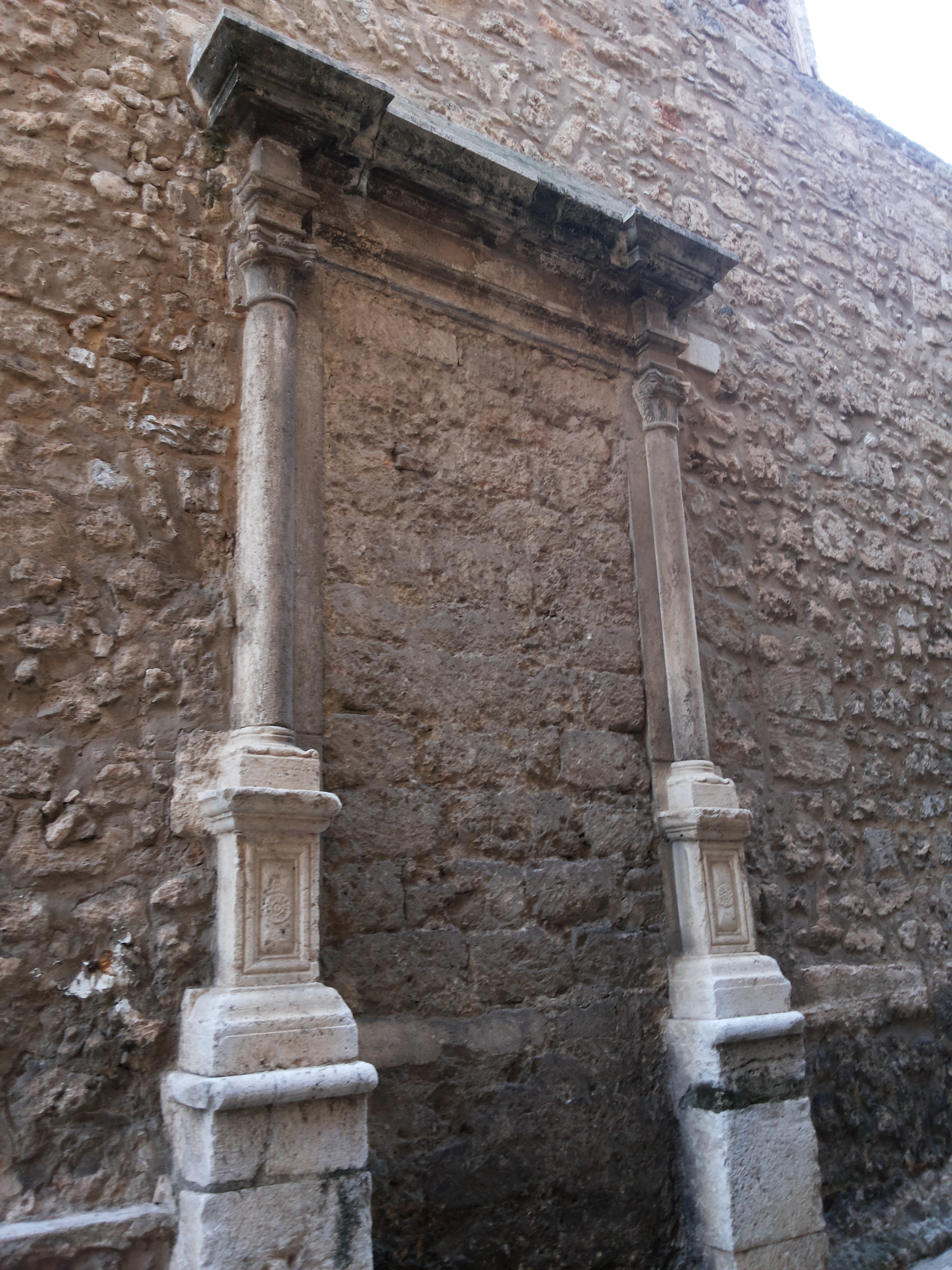
Side portal

== Madonna del Soccorso ==
The veneration for this Madonna started in Palermo in 1306, following the apparition to the Augustinian Friar Nicola La Bruna. People say that the monk, tormented by an incurable disease and very close to death, had been healed thanks to Madonna, who asked him, in return for it, to propagate the news of the miracle and to have her invoked as Our Lady of Help.

Thanks to the Augustinian Friars, the veneration for Our Lady of Help spread all over Italy. Another title given to her is Our Lady with the Club, because she is represented while brandishing a small club to hit the demon crouched and terrified at her feet.

== See also ==
- Catholic Church in Italy

== Sources ==
- Guadalupi, Gianni; Coppola, Mariano (1995). Alcamo, introduzione di Vincenzo Regina(collana Grand Tour) (in Italian). Milan: Grafiche Mazzucchelli. ISBN 88-216-0615-5.
- Cataldo, Carlo (2011). La conchiglia di S. Giacomo p.113 (in Italian). Alcamo: Edizioni Campo.
- Cataldo, Carlo (1982). Guida storico-artistica di Alcamo-Calatafimi-Castellammare del Golfo-Salemi-Vita p.60. Alcamo: Sarograf.
- http://www.esperonews.it/20130218289/rubriche/leggende-e-curiosita-del-territorio/caltavuturo-e-gratteri-un-antico-culto-madonita-verso-la-ss-vergine-del-soccorso.html
