= Francesco Maria Mirabella =

Italian historian, educator, and poet

Francesco Maria Mirabella (Alcamo, 4 April 1850 – Alcamo, 27 December 1931) was an Italian historian, educator, and poet.

== Biography ==
He was born in Alcamo (in the province of Trapani): his father was Ludovico Mirabella, an ebonist and sculptor, among whose works there is a wooden statue of Saint Francis of Assisi in the Church of Saint Anne, and his mother was Maria Cassarà. After ending his studies with Jesuits, he attended the Royal Gimnasium getting the Teacher Training School diploma. So he started his school career first at Erice, then at Castellammare del Golfo and later in Alcamo. When he was 39 he married with Maria Culmone and they had five children.

Mirabella was a teacher for several years, and since 1903 he was a head teacher.

He also had a strong interest in the history of the territory of Alcamo, and published more than 50 works, including essays and books on the literature and art of Sicily and Alcamo. The correspondence between Mirabella and Giuseppe Pitrè is also important, as it contains information about the folkloristic material sent to him.

Like Pietro Maria Rocca, he was also engaged with the works of cataloguing of the Civic Library and the notarial Archive. He died on 27 December 1931.

After his death, they entitled him the homonymous Comprehensive School which is located in Viale Italia in Alcamo.

== Works ==
1. A la Madonna di li miraculi (rhymes in Sicilian dialect; Alcamo: Tip. Jemma, 1954 (posthumous)
2. Alcamensia: noterelle storiche con appendice di documenti inediti di Francesco Maria Mirabella; Alcamo: ed. Sarograf, 1980
3. Al Camo per Alcamo in un documento alcamese del 1564 (in Archivio Storico Siciliano, n.s., a.26, 1901)
4. Alcamo sacra, scritto di G.B. Bembina, con note di P. M. Rocca, rivedute ed accresciute da Francesco Maria Mirabella. (Accademia di studi cielo d'Alcamo); Alcamo: Tip. Cartografica, 1956 (posthumous)
5. Ancora su Marco Filippi poeta cinquecentista, di Francesco Maria Mirabella; Palermo: Scuola tip. Boccone del povero, 1924
6. Artisti trapanesi in Alcamo (in La Siciliana, a.8, n.12, Siracusa, 1925)
7. Bernardo Tornamira benefattore della biblioteca di San Martino delle Scale, di Francesco M. Mirabella; Palermo: tip. Lo Statuto, 1895
8. Canti latini di Sebastiano Bagolino; verseggiati in volgare da Francesco M. Mirabella; Alcamo: tipografia Bagolino presso L. Pipitone e C., 1876
9. Cenni degli Alcamesi rinomati in scienze, lettere, arti, armi e santità, compilati da Francesco M. Mirabella; preceduti da una memoria storica dell'origine di Alcamo;Alcamo: tip. Gaetano Surdi e C., 1876
10. Cenni degli alcamesi rinomati in scienze, lettere, arti e santità, di Francesco M. Mirabella; Sala Bolognese: A. Forni, stampa 1973
11. Cielo D'Alcamo ossia la quistione del nome dell'autore del contrasto «Rosa fresca aulentissima», riesaminata da F. M. Mirabella; Alcamo: Francesco Spica, 1892
12. Degli Emblemi Morali di mons. Giovanni Orosco tradotti da Sebastiano Bagolino (in Nuove Effemeridi Siciliane, s.3, v.13, 1882)
13. Della tradizione popolare alcamese (in La Tempra, a.2, n 2, Alcamo, 1922
14. Dell'origine di Alcamo; memoria storica seguita da cinque tavole sinottiche delle opere d'arte e de monumenti antichi della medesima città e del suo territorio, per Francesco M. Mirabella; Alcamo: Tip. G. Surdi e C., 1875
15. Di alcuni disegni e dipinti di Sebastiano Bagolino (in Archivio Storico Siciliano, n.s., a.9, 1885)
16. Di Leonardo Bagolino pittore del secolo XVI e di una sua tela residente in Alcamo: notizie seguite da documenti, di F.M. Mirabella; Palermo: stabilimento bibliografico Virzì, 1882
17. Di un codice autografo di Sebastiano Bagolino (in Nuove Effemeridi Siciliane, s.3, v.5,1877)
18. Di un mendacio relativo alla rivoluzione del 1860 (in La Siciliana, Siracusa, 1931)
19. Di un poeta cinquecentista sconosciuto: Marco Filippi: miscellanea di F.M. Mirabella (in Archivio Storico Siciliano, n.s., a.38,1913)
20. Dodici epigrammi inediti di Sebastiano Bagolino tratti da un manoscritto del suo tempo (in Nuove Effemeridi Siciliane, s.3, v.11,1881)
21. Ero e Leandro: poemetto greco, versione di Francesco M. Mirabella; Palermo: tip. del giornale di Sicilia, 1882
22. Esercizi pratici coordinati alle regole grammaticali per gli alunni delle scuole elementari superiori, compilate dal prof. P. G. Piazza; Palermo: Libr. Internazionale L. Pedone Lauriel di Carlo Clausen Edit., 1889 (Tip. Dello Statuto)
23. Frammenti di un diario alcamese del secolo 18° di Stefano Monteleone; [pref. di F. M. Mirabella]; Alcamo: Tip. Francesco Spica, 1892
24. Giacomo Fazio soldato e poeta; Palermo: Tipografia Boccone del Povero, 1928
25. Guida artistica della città di Alcamo, compilata da F.M. Mirabella e P.M. Rocca; Alcamo: Tipografia Bagolino, 1884
26. Il Crocifisso dell'Abbondanza (in La Siciliana, a.7, n.8, Siracusa, 1924)
27. Il Moncata. Dialogo di Sebastiano Bagolino ora la prima volta pubblicato per cura e con prefazione di F. M. Mirabella; Alcamo: Tipografia Francesco Spiga, 1887
28. La canzona di Ciullo d'Alcamo; chiosata e commentata da Francesco M. Mirabella; Alcamo: Tipografia e litografia Bagolino, 1872
29. La pesca nei mari e nelle acque interne d'Italia; Milano: La goliardica, 1963
30. La provincia di Trapani: Notizie di geografia astronomica, fisica, politica e storica ad uso delle scuole della provincia stessa per Francesco M. Mirabella; Palermo: Tipografia del Giornale di Sicilia, 1882
31. Le feste catanesi di S.Agata cent'anni or sono (in La Tempra, a.2, n2, Alcamo, 1922
32. Lu cuntu di li tri arrigordi(in archivio per lo studio delle tradizioni popolari, a.13, Palermo, 1894
33. L'ultima prigionia di Argisto Giuffrè; Palermo: tip. Lo statuto, 1898
34. Marco Gentiluccio da Spoleto poeta italiano e Latino del secolo 16°: notizie per Francesco M. Mirabella; Spoleto: Tip. P. Bossi, 1882
35. Memorie biografiche alcamesi: precedute da notizie sull'origine e sulle antichità ed opere d'arte della città di Alcamo, F. M. Mirabella; Alcamo: prem. tip. V.Segesta e figli, 1924
36. Nuovi documenti su Giacomo Pino Salemi, Baldassare Massa e Battista Carrabio scultori del secolo 16°, di Francesco M. Mirabella; Palermo: tip. dello Statuto, 1892
37. Privilegio concesso a salvatore Burgarella da carlo V imperatore (in Archivio Storico Siciliano, n.s., a.13, 1888)
38. Scioglilingua siciliani (in Archivio per lo studio delle tradizioni popolari, a.6, Palermo, 1887)
39. Sebastiano Bagolino poeta Latino ed erudito del secolo 16°; (in Archivio Storico Siciliano, n.s., a.23–26, 1908–1911)
40. Sull'alfabeto vulgare: osservazioni e proposte, di Francesco Maria Mirabella; Alcamo: G. Surdi e C.,1874
41. Su l'origine e le opere d'arte della Maggiore Chiesa di Alcamo; Alcamo, 1919
42. Sul reclusorio delle donne riparate di Alcamo e altre note storiche; Alcamo, Sarograf, 1981 (posthumous)
43. Sul verso che precede la prima strofa del Contrasto di Cielo d'Alcamo ne' notamenti di A. Colocci, osservazioni di Francesco M. Mirabella; Bologna: Tipografia Fava e Garagnani, 1886
44. Una lettera del P. Mariano Bonofino di Alcamo, di Francesco M. Mirabella; Palermo: Tipografia dello Statuto, 1884
45. Un documento riguardante la più antica edizione dei carmi latini di Sebastiano Bagolino (in il Biblofilo, a.4, n.5, Bologna, 1883)

== See also ==
- Sebastiano Bagolino
- Carlo Cataldo
- Nino Navarra (poet)
- Vincenzo Regina
- Pietro Maria Rocca

== Sources ==
- Andrea Chiarelli, Dario Cocchiara, Alcamo nel XX secolo volume I, Alcamo, Campo, 2005.
- Carlo Cataldo, La Casa del Sole: storia, folklore e cultura di Sicilia, Alcamo, grafiche Campo, 1999.
