= Carlo Cataldo =

Italian historian, poet, and teacher (1933–2021)

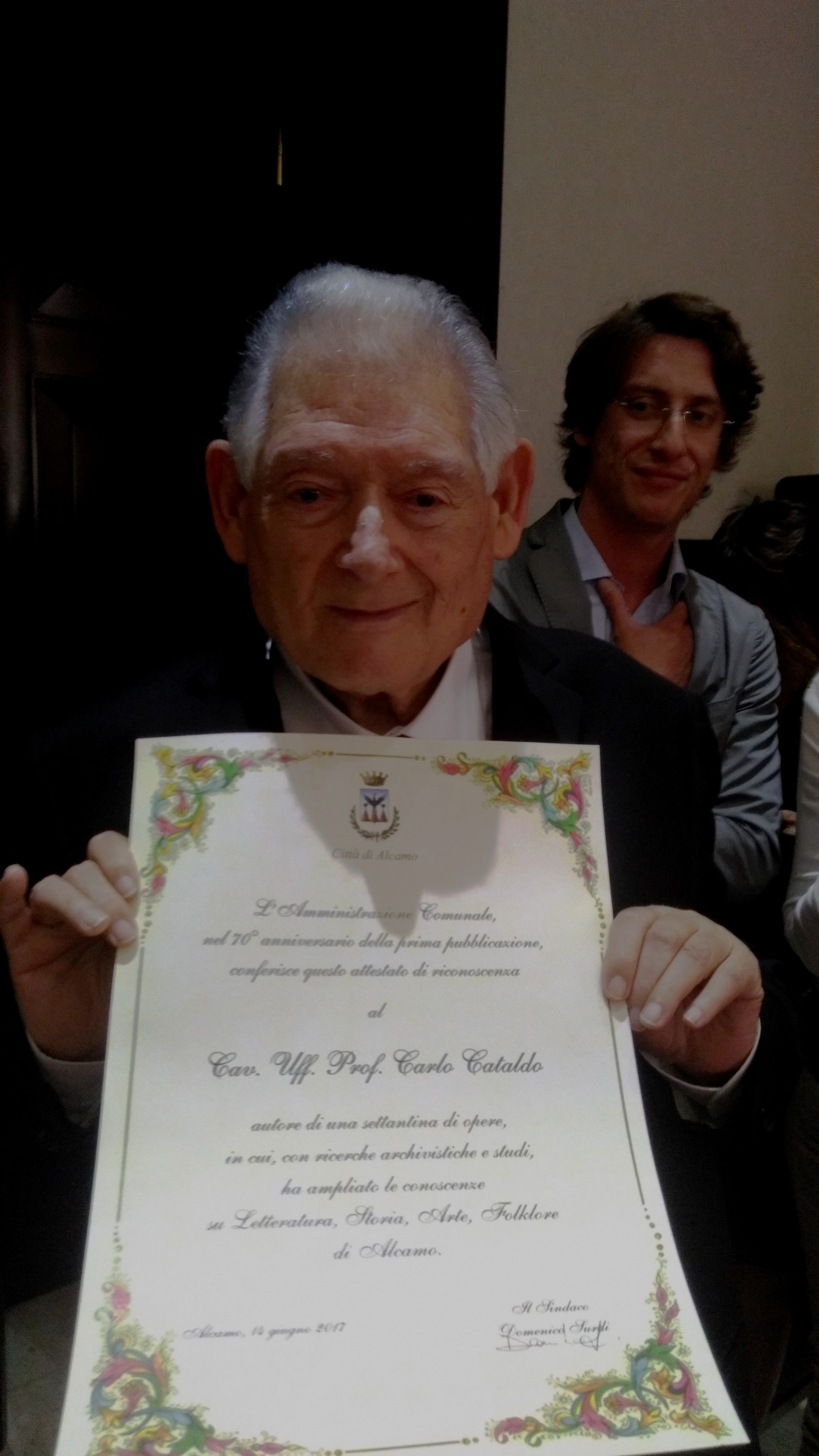
Cataldo with a certificate received in 2017

Carlo Cataldo (7 June 1933 – 19 August 2021) was an Italian historian, poet, and teacher.

== Biography ==
Cataldo was born in Alcamo, Italy. From childhood he was fond of reading and studying historical events; in 1943, when schools were closed because of the war in the district of Alcamo, he devoted himself to reading the newspaper Giornale di Sicilia, which his father bought every day. He read the Divine Comedy and The Betrothed, which he found in his father's library.

He consulted history books and copied news on patriots, scientists and other personalities, then he listed and made an inventory, adding data taken from other sources of information. Since childhood he showed his literary talent, by publishing at only 14 years old a short poem in dialect, dedicated to the patroness saint of Alcamo and entitled A Maria SS. di li Miraculi, ni lu quartu cintinariu di la so' truvazioni.

When he was still tenth-grade (terza liceo) student, he won the first prize in a national student contest proclaimed by the Ministry of Public Education on the subject "the cult of trees" (il culto degli alberi); he published an appreciated collection of poems entitled Nirvana azzurro where he expressed joy, hope and love for his native land; in his juvenile dreams he longs for a clear sky, a day without tomorrow.

He graduated in Letters with First Class Honours on 28 June 1956 at the University of Palermo, with the thesis entitled Folklore di Alcamo, as he had always been fond of folklore and dialect poetry; he also taught Letters for forty years, the last twenty of them at liceo classico "Cielo d'Alcamo" in Alcamo.

== Activity ==
Cataldo was a classical poet, cultured and refined, and his literary activity was intense and substantial: apart from his history, art and folklore books, he published a lot of works, in verse and prose, of his fellow citizens, carefully editing them, so giving value to Sicilian dialect culture.

As regards his historiographical works, the author examined a great deal of documents in the notarial, churches, dioceses, and private archives in the province of Trapani and Palermo, in addition to those of national character in Milan, Rome, Mantua, Turin and Naples.

Over the years he took care of several interviews, debates and articles on periodicals Il Vespro, La Gazzetta del Golfo, Il Bonifato and others in the province of Trapani.

He took part in various seminars and meetings, among which that on Sicilian folklore (1985) which took place in Trapani, and that on "Ermeneutica antropologica e fonti del diritto" (1986), in Trapani too. On 3 December 2018, Cataldo was the protagonist of two television programs: on Rai 3, in "Passato e presente", he spoke with Paolo Mieli about Giuseppe Garibaldi, and, in the evening, on Rai Storia, he presented the controversial figure of Garibaldi, whom he had investigated and written about in some of his works.

Two of his works, Alcamo e Garibaldi, and Calatafimi e Garibaldi are present in Italian and international bibliographies.

== Appreciations ==
- Parchment received by the lord mayor of Alcamo, doctor Massimo Ferrara, as a testimonial of gratitude on behalf of the citizens for his literary activity, June 1997.
- President of Association of the dialect Poets "Cielo d'Alcamo"; he published seven anthologies with it and edited about thirty of their works.
- Member of the Istituto per la storia del Risorgimento italiano.
- Member of the Società siciliana di storia patria.
- Member of Centro Internazionale di Ethnohistory of Palermo.
- Honorary member of Associazione per la tutela delle tradizioni popolari del Trapanese.
- Honorary citizenship of the small town of Camporeale since 1993, owing to his writing its first documented history.
- Honorable Mention at Premio Internazionale di Studi Etnoantropologici "Pitrè-Salomone Marino" in 1994 for his work Accanto alle aquile.
- Bronze medal by the municipality of Palermo, 2001, in the context of Premio Internazionale di Studi Etnoantropologici "Pitrè-Salomone Marino" per l'anno 2000.
- Two silver plaques: one for his ethnoanthropological studies and the other for his praiseworthy activity of research and scientific production in the name of recovery and safeguard of Sicilian popular traditions.
- Honorable Mention at Premio Internazionale "Giovi Città di Salerno", 2003, "La conchiglia di S. Giacomo" (a copy of the book was requested by the archives of the Library of the Catedral de Santiago de Compostela in Spain) in 2006.
- Honour of Knight (Cavaliere della Repubblica) al Merito, 2006.
- Premio Internazionale Teatro di Segesta in 2006.
- Honorary citizenship of Calatafimi-Segesta, given at Pianto Romano on 15 May 2008.
- Honour of Officer (Ufficiale dell'Ordine al Merito della Repubblica), on 2 June 2012.
- Silver plaque received by the Lord Mayor of Alcamo for his passionate and close historical researches, aiming at the reinforcement and promotion of the identity of Alcamo and of the old and noble traditions of this town; on 19 March 2012.
- Member of the scientific team which is responsible for the National Edition of Giuseppe Pitrè's works.
- Certificate of acknowledgment given by the Lord Mayor of Alcamo for his 70th year of activity in favour of culture, art, folklore, 14 June 2017.

== Publications ==
He published the following works:

=== Poems ===
1. A Maria Ss. di li Miraculi, ni lu quartu cintinnariu di la so 'truvazioni, ed. Bagolino, Alcamo, 1947.

2. Nirvana azzurro; Alcamo, 1953.

3. Inno a S. Benedetto nel XV centenario della nascita, 480–1980, set to music by Maestro Vincenzo Maria Cassarà; Alcamo, 1980.

4. Inno a S. Scolastica nel XV centenario della nascita, 480–1980, set to music by Maestro Vincenzo Maria Cassarà; Alcamo, 1981.

5. Inno a S. Francesco d'Assisi nell'VIII centenario della nascita, 1181–1981, set to music by M°. Vincenzo Maria Cassar, 1981.

6. Inno per il bicentenario dell'Incoronazione di Maria SS. dei Miracoli, 1784–1984, set to music by M°. Vincenzo Maria Cassarà; Alcamo, 1984.

7. Inno a S. Chiara d'Assisi, set to music by Maestro Vincenzo Maria Cassarà; Alcamo, 1999.

=== Dialect poems (in anthologies with other dialect poets) ===
1. Zagare nuziali, 1970.

2. Crisantemi, 1970.

3. Ciuri di ciuri, 1988.

4. Vuci di cori, 1995.

5. Parpiti e suspiri, 1997.

6. Luci di sintimenti, 1998.

7. Filicità di vita, 2000.

8. Surrisi di arvuli, 2002.

9. Comu un sacru ritu, 2006.

10. Acqua di surgenti, 2011.

11. Sicilia bedda: poesie in dialetto siciliano di Pietro Mule; edited by Carlo Cataldo and with his introduction Carlo Cataldo, tipografia Olbia, Alcamo, 1997.

12. Vecchi ricordi: poesie in dialetto siciliano di Giacomo Risico; edited by Carlo Cataldo and with his introduction; ed. Campo, Alcamo, 1997.

13. Lu me' cunfortu fu la puisia: poesie postume di Giuseppe Milotta; edited by Stefano Milotta e Carlo Cataldo; prefazione di Carlo Cataldo, ed. Campo, 1990.

14. Breviario lirico: versi postumi di Silvia De Caro Mirrione; edited by Antonio Mirrione and Carlo Cataldo, ed. Campo, Alcamo, 1987.

=== History, art and folklore ===
1. Documenti inediti su chiese benedettine alcamesi; Alcamo, 1980.

2. Guida storico-artistica dei beni culturali di Alcamo, Calatafimi, Castellammare del Golfo, Salemi e Vita; Alcamo, Sarograf, 1982.

3. Affreschi e decorazioni dello scomparso teatro comunale di Alcamo; Trapani, 1983.

4. La Sacra Rappresentazione di Cristo in Alcamo. Cronistoria di una tradizione; Alcamo, 1984.

5. Tradizioni religiose di Alcamo; Alcamo, edizioni Campo, 1984.

6. Alcamo e Garibaldi. Saggio storico-commemoratìvo per il centenario della morte di Garibaldi; Alcamo, Edizioni Campo, 1984.

7. Il culto di S. Carlo Borromeo in Alcamo; Alcamo, Edizioni Campo, 1984.

8. La chiesa e il culto di S. Tommaso apostolo in Alcamo, Alcamo, Edizioni Campo, 1985.

9. Il sacro nell'artigianato alcamese del passato; Trapani, 1985.

10. Folklore sacro in Alcamo; Alcamo, Edizioni Campo, 1986.

11. Carteggio G. Pitrè – F. M. Mirabella, 1986.

12. Tre atti rispettosi in un matrimonio alcamese dell'800; Alcamo, 1987.

13. La rivoluzione del 1848 nella Sicilia occidentale: nuovi studi e nuovi documenti (con Giuseppe Mistretta Di Paola); Alcamo, Edizioni Campo, 1988.

14. Calatafimi e Garibaldi. Saggio storiografico sulla battaglia di Pianto Romano: 15 maggio 1860; Alcamo, Sarograf, 1990.

15. Accanto alle aquile. Il castello alcamese dì Bonifato e il santuario di S. Maria dell'Alto; Palermo, ed.Brotto, 1991.

16. I giardini di Adone. Fede, feste e sinodi diocesani nel folklore di Alcamo, Associazione per la tutela delle tradizioni popolari del trapanese; Trapani, 1992.

17. Storia di Camporeale con documenti inediti, in L. ACCARDO – C. CATALDO, Storia di Camporeale, 1993.

18. Cavalli e feste in Alcamo, in AA. vv., Cavalli, festa, città; Alcamo, 1994.

19. Un poeta dell'età fridericiana, incluso in: Carlo Cataldo-B.Barranca, Cielo e il "contrasto" sul suo monumento; Alcamo, ed. Sarograf, 1996.

20. I fratelli Sant'Anna, benemeriti del Risorgimento italiano, in AA. vv., Cultura e impegno civile. Omaggio a Rocco Fodale; Paceco, 1997.

21. I suoni sommersi. Musica, danza e teatro ad Alcamo; Alcamo, ed. Campo, 1997.

22. Il pane della libertà. Storia della Casa di Ospitalità "A. Mangione" (Un contributo allo studio delle Opere Pie di Sicilia); Alcamo, ed. Campo, 1998.

23. Le Riparate. Il Reclusorio dell'Angelo Custode di Alcamo nella storia del costume in Sicilia, edizioni Campo, Alcamo, 1998.

24. La Casa del Sole. Storia, folklore e cultura di Sicilia; edizioni Campo, Alcamo, 1999.

25. Il ponte e gli alberi. Cinque secoli di istruzione scolastica ad Alcamo nella storia della cultura in Sicilia; edizioni Campo, Alcamo, 2000.

26. La conchiglia di S. Giacomo. Sette secoli di pii sodalizi ad Alcamo per la storia civile e religiosa della Sicilia, edizioni Campo, Alcamo, 2001.

27. Giovanni Battista Quinci, in Mazara 800-900 a c. di A. Cusumano e R. Lentini, 2002.

28. 130 anni di giornalismo alcamese, 1873–2003. Dal "Segestano" al "Segestano News", in AA. V.V., Alcamo e la Stampa, Trapani, Editoriale Siciliana Informazioni, 2003.

29. Le rose di Damasco. La vita attiva alcamese dal '300 a oggi nella storia del lavoro in Sicilia, 2003.

30. Forti come le rocce. Squadriglieri e garibaldini del Trapanese, 1860 e 1862, in Studi garibaldini, n. 5/6, Marsala, 2004.

31. Garibaldi e i Mille, da Marsala a Calatafimi (discorso commemorativo sul 15 maggio 1860), ed. Campo, Alcamo, 2005.

32. La storia di Zalapì. Sei briganti ad Alcamo nel 1888, con Erina Baldassano, ed. Campo, 2005.

33. A perenne testimonianza. Epigrafi garibaldine nel Trapanese. Estratto da Studi garibaldini, n. 7, Marsala, 2005.

34. I proverbi ritrovati. Aforistica popolare siciliana, 2005.

35. Splendori della memoria: Arte, storia, cultura, mito e tradizioni popolari, 2006.

36. Prima e dopo Garibaldi. Sicilia occidentale, 1789–1870, 2007.

37. Giovanni Pantaleo, alfiere del Risorgimento, in ISTITUTO STATALE DI ISTRUZIONI SUPERIORE – Castelvetrano Selinunte, Logoi, Trapani, 2007.

38. Calatafimi Segesta tra memoria e storia, edizioni Campo, Alcamo, 2008.

39. Il processo Zalapì nel 1891, con Erina Baldassano, ed. Campo, 2008.

40. Uomini e stelle. Il ciclo esistenziale nel folklore di Alcamo e della Sicilia, edizioni Campo, Alcamo, 2008.

41. Sei importanti documenti superstiti dell'antico archivio della chiesa di S. Maria del Soccorso e SS. Quatrro Coronati, in P.ANCONA-E.PAPA, Due testimonianze di religiosità calatafimese, Alcamo, 2009.

42. Considerazioni sulla cultura presepiale in Italia, in Venite, adoremus, a cura di A. Amitrano, Etnostoria, Roma, dicembre 2009.

43. Il monte incantato. narrazioni e canti popolari nel folklore di Alcamo e della Sicilia, 2010.

44. La Patria e la Legge. Avvocatura e Risorgimento in 160 biografie, 2011.

45. Ultimi fuochi: Storia del Liceo Classico di Alcamo negli anni finali della sua autonomia, in Lo frutto, 2012.

46. Le sabbie colorate. Tradizioni della Settimana Santa ad Alcamo, 2012.

47. Lo scultore alcamese Giuseppe Bambina: con rassegna fotografica delle sue opere a cura dei figli Antonino e Silvana Bambina, 2014.

48. Alcamo nella storia, nella leggenda e nell'arte / Salvatore Messina; con prefazione di Carlo Cataldo e Giovanni Messina Campo, Alcamo, 2015.

49–52. G. PITRE' Usi e costumi, credenze e pregiudizi del popolo siciliano: 4 volumi pubblicati in edizione critica, a cura di Carlo Cataldo per l'Edizione Nazionale delle Opere di Giuseppe Pitrè, decretata dal Ministero per i Beni e le Attività Culturali con introduzioni, note esplicative, numerose appendici del Curatore e con indicazione delle varianti eseguita sugli ingenti manoscritti pitreiani, conservati nel Centro Internazionale di Etnostoria di Palermo, 2008.

== See also ==
- Alcamo
- Calatafimi-Segesta
- Giuseppe Garibaldi
- Folklore
- Giuseppe Pitrè

== Sources ==
- Baldassano Erina, Cataldo Carlo: Ricordando i 16 lustri di Carlo Cataldo; Alcamo, edizioni Campo, 2013
- Lo frutto, i 150 anni del Liceo Classico di Alcamo, a cura di Francesco Melia e Gaetano Stellino p. 82–85 e 168; ed. Campo; Alcamo, 2012
- https://www.trapaninostra.it/libri/salvatoremugno/Poesia_narrativa_saggistica_in_provincia_di_Trapani/Poesia_narrativa_saggistica_in_provincia_di_Trapani.pdf
