= Palazzo De Ballis =

Palace in Alcamo, Italy

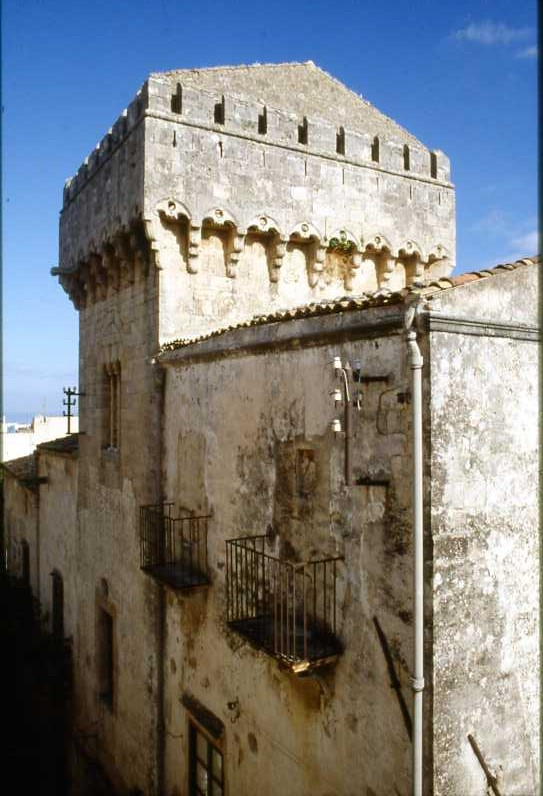
- Palazzo De Ballis, the tower
- Interactive map of the Palazzo De Ballis area

General information
- Architectural style: Spanish gothic
- Location: Alcamo, Italy
- Coordinates: 37°58′54″N 12°58′01″E
- Construction started: 1495
- Client: De Ballis Family

Design and construction
- Architects: Tommaso and Pietro Oddo

Palazzo De Ballis is a 15th-century historical building of Spanish Gothic architecture; the Tower De Ballis is a part of it. It is located in the town centre of Alcamo, in the province of Trapani.

== History ==
According to the historian Pietro Maria Rocca the palace dates back to 1495.

It belonged to the De Ballis family, noblemen native of Piacenza, who built it, and was made after the designs of Tommaso and Pietro Oddo, (father and son) who were from Monreale (Palermo).

After the extinction of the De Ballis, the property transferred to the Papè and Polizzi family, the part including the tower belongs to the D’Angelo family, while the other part belongs to the family Castrogiovanni-Iannitto.

=== Description ===
Giuseppe Polizzi describes the palace in this way:

Torre De Ballis, whose upper partis well kept, has a rectangular window, divided into three lights by two small columns and a mullioned window in the posterior façade, besides a beautiful frame with Machicolation, sustaining the merlons. Doors with elliptical arches, surrounded by gothic shape leaning on small moulded corbels.

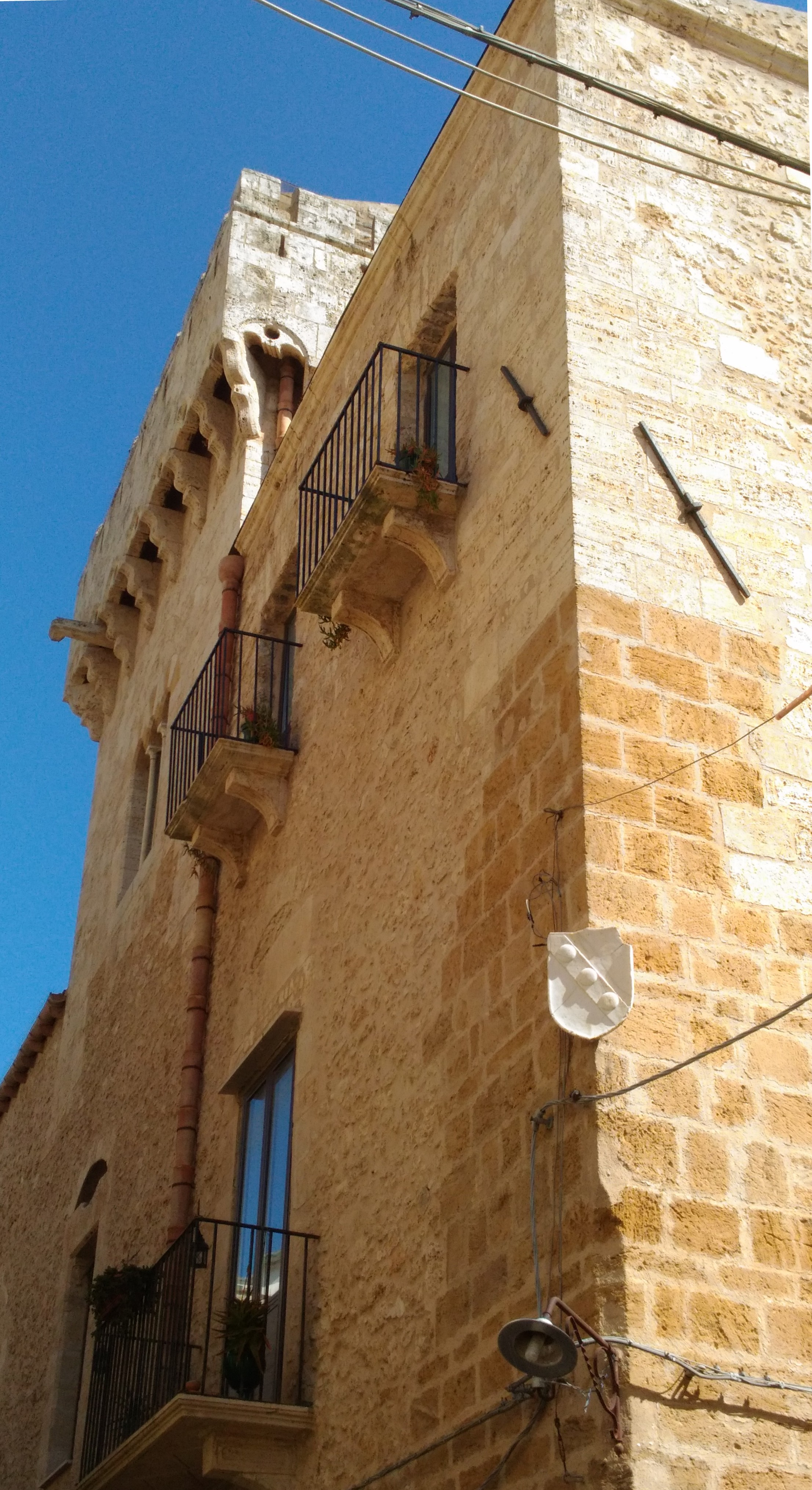
Palazzo De Ballis, after the last restoration

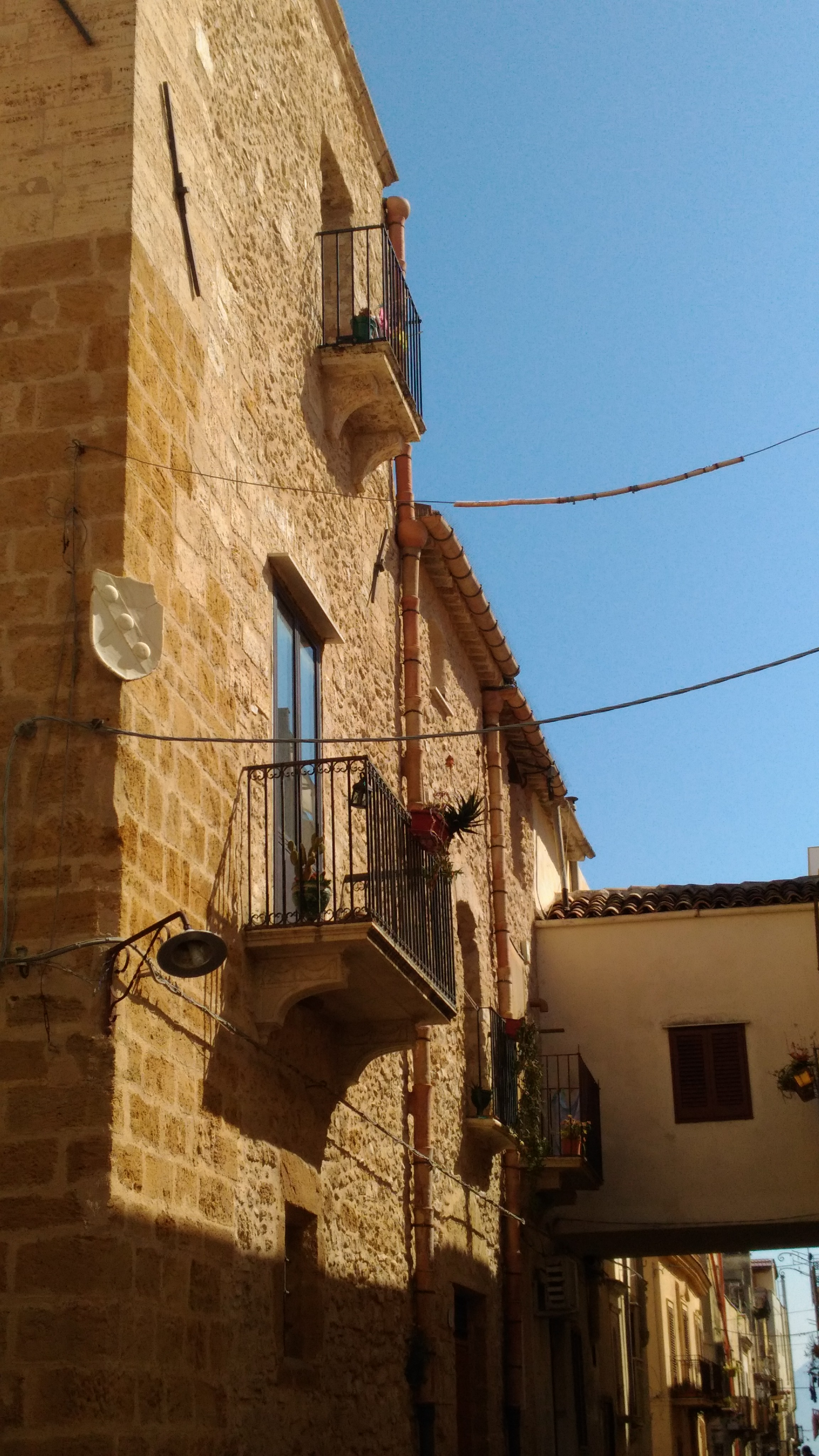
Palazzo De Ballis, seen from via Madonna dell'Alto

On the first floor the square tower has a window with an architrave and small corbels; on the second floor, there is a three-light-window inserted into a round arch; on the eastern side of the court yard there is a mullioned window. The tower is surrounded by merlons, leaning on little niches sustaining pointed arches.

In ancient times the main door was in the middle; in the 18th century it was substituted by two new doors: the one at the street number 21, has a calcarenite portal with two bases surmounted by lesenes; the second, at the number 23, is smaller and has two irregular bases, owing to the restoration of the road surface; you can enter the tower through a staircase from the entrance at the house number 23.

On the first floor there are four balconies, two of them have stone galleries with fluted corbels; on the south side, on the second floor, there are two balconies with two stones galleries too; on the ground floor, in via Madonna dell’Alto, there are three doors and three windows of modern residential buildings. The first floor has four small balconies, and another one on the second floor; at the corner there is the De Ballis family's coat of arms, with a banded shield having three balls.

Inside the palace there is an elegant court yard, with a staircase leading to the first floor; the doors here are lacquered and their panels with glasses, painted with flowers and different figures. Inside the hall there are some frescoes that were restored by professor Giuseppe Ganga in 1985, representing multicolour flowers and landscapes. The centre of the vault is surmounted by a rose window, instead, and the bedroom is embellished by a canopy bed and some frescoes on the ceiling.

In 2005 the palace and its tower were restored and have complied with the originary characteristics of the building: these works were entirely at the D’Angelo family's own expense.

=== Associazione Culturale Musikè ===
It has its own seat in this building and its purpose is to promote art and music, in order to contribute to the growth and interior beauty, of teenagers above all, through exhibitions, concerts, music and singing courses, music therapy, besides the diffusion of literary subjects and Maths.

Another goal is to recover tastes, uses and traditions of our past; they give dinners, and you can also make a guided visit at Palazzo de Ballis.

== See also ==
- Palazzo Palmerini
- Alcamo
- Pietro Maria Rocca
- Carlo Cataldo

== Sources ==
- Roberto Calia: I Palazzi dell'aristocrazia e della borghesia alcamese; Alcamo, Carrubba, 1997
- Carlo Cataldo: Guida storico-artistica dei beni culturali di Alcamo, Calatafimi, Castellammare del Golfo, Salemi e Vita, Sarograf-Alcamo (1982)
- "Alqamah".
- "comune di Alcamo". Archived from the original on 2015-04-03.
- P.M. Rocca: di alcuni antichi edifici di Alcamo; Palermo, tip. Castellana-Di Stefano, 1905
- Giuseppe Polizzi: I monumenti di antichità e d'arte della provincia di Trapani; Trapani, Giovanni Modica Romano, 1879, p. 61
