= Pietro Maria Rocca =

Italian historian

Pietro Maria Rocca (24 August 1847 – 26 August 1918) was an Italian historian.

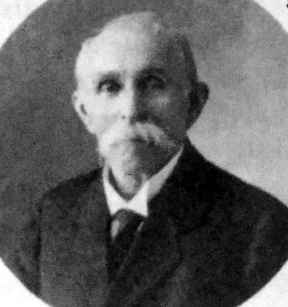
P.M.Rocca

== Biography ==
He was born into quite a rich family in Alcamo, in the province of Trapani; after he had finished his studies among the Jesuits, he entered the episcopal seminary of Mazara del Vallo, but as he had no inclination for an ecclesiastical career, he left this seminary and followed his studies independently. Since his youth, however, he committed himself in the social field and for the public good.

In 1863 they founded the first Conference of Saint Vincent de Paul in Alcamo, and in 1871 Pietro Maria Rocca promoted the institution of a boarding school of little artisans for the sustenance and education of young boys coming from poor families at the ex Convent of Saint Francis. In spite of all its appreciations, the boarding school was closed after a little time due to financial problems.

In 1877 inside the Ex Church of Saint James of the Sword they had collected all the books from the convents suppressed by government, and Rocca made himself available for the cataloguing of those books, so originating the Civic Library in Alcamo.

In 1881 he was admitted to the Società Siciliana per la Storia Patria and in 1884 he became a municipal councillor: he proposed the realization of a raised floor in the Ex Church of Saint James in order to protect from humidity the books and the notarial deeds he had collected.

He also gathered some finds, such as oil lamps and stamps of bent tiles of the Roman age, and later entrusted them to the National Archaeological Museum of Palermo, where they can currently be seen.

In 1893, he was appointed as president of the local hospital and he also had the office of Fine Arts Inspector. During all his life he was keen on the history and monuments of his town, publishing tens of books for which he received several favourable approvals and statements of merit.

== Works ==
1. Capitoli della pescheria della città d'Alcamo: 1554; edited by P. M. Rocca (1887)
2. Della Cappella della Madonna dei miracoli in Alcamo; in: Archivio storico siciliano Ser. NS, vol. 6 (1881) p. 352-359
3. Della Chiesa di S. Nicolò di Bari in Alcamo; Palermo: Tipografia dello Statuto, 1892
4. Della Chiesa di S. Tommaso Apostolo in Alcamo; Palermo: Tipografia lo Statuto, 1896
5. Della Chiesetta della Madonna delle Grazie in Alcamo e di un quadro della titolare dello stesso sacro edifizio; Palermo: Tipografia Boccone del Povero, 1911
6. Delle fiere franche della città di Alcamo: notizie e documenti; Palermo: Tipografia Lo Statuto, 1889
7. Della Membrana gabellarum e dei Capitoli della Nadaria e della Camperia della terra di Alcamo; Palermo: Tipografia Boccone del Povero, 1905
8. Delle muraglie e porte della città di Alcamo; Palermo: Tipografia Lo Statuto, 1894
9. Del quadro della Cappella Triolo nella Chiesa Madre di Alcamo; in: Archivio storico siciliano Ser. NS, vol. 8 (1883) p. 511-516
10. Di alcuni stuccatori che lavoravano in Alcamo nel secolo 18°: notizie e documenti; Palermo: Tipografia Virzì, 1882
11. Di alcuni antichi edifizi di Alcamo; Palermo: Tipografia Castellana-Di Stefano, 1905
12. Di una nota del cav. Giuseppe Triolo Galifi relativa al soggiorno in Alcamo dell'Imperatore Carlo 5° nel 1535; Palermo: Tipografia Boccone del Povero, 1912
13. Documenti relativi a pitture di Giuseppe Carrera; Palermo: Tipografia Virzì, 1881
14. Documenti relativi a sei oscuri pittori siciliani dei secoli 17° e 18°; Palermo: Tipografia Boccone del povero, 1907
15. Documenti relativi a tre ignoti pittori siciliani del secolo 16°-17°; Palermo: Tipografia dello Statuto, 1896
16. Documenti relativi ad alcuni intagliatori in legno che lavoravano in Alcamo nella prima metà del secolo 16°; Palermo: Tipografia Lo Statuto, 1896
17. Documenti sulle chiese di Alcamo fondate nei secoli 16° e 17° di P.M. Rocca-De Blasi, Ignazio. / aggiunte e correzioni al cap. # del discorso storico della opulenta città di Alcamo del dott. Ignazio De Blasi (1900); Palermo: Tipografia dello Statuto
18. Documenti su Mario Giambona: pittore siciliano del secolo # Palermo: Tipografia dello Statuto, 1892
19. Due contratti di pace tra privati nel secolo 16°; 1893
20. Due documenti sul pittore Giuseppe Sirena; Palermo: Tipografia dello Statuto, 1895
21. Ferdinando Vega nella tradizione popolare alcamese, 1892
22. Fonditori di campane in Alcamo; Palermo: Tipografia dello Statuto, 1890
23. Guida artistica della città di Alcamo compilata da F.M. Mirabella e P.M. Rocca; Alcamo: Tipografia Bagolino, 1884
24. Ignazio Ingrassia: scultore trapanese del secolo 17°; Palermo: Tipografia del giornale il Tempo, 1881
25. I Saltarello orefici siciliani del secolo XVI; in: Archivio storico siciliano Ser. NS, vol. 9 (1884) p. 425-429
26. Leggende e racconti siciliani, 1888
27. Miscellanea alcamese: note storiche e racconti popolari / Pietro Maria Rocca; prefazione di Francesco Maria Mirabella; Alcamo: Sarograf, 1986
28. Notizie storiche su Castellammare del Golfo, estratte dall'archivio dei Notari defunti alcamesi; Palermo: Tip. Dello Statuto, 1886
29. Sopra un antico privilegio concesso a Bonifato e Indi confermato ad Alcamo; Palermo: Tip. Dello Statuto, 1887
30. Tre tele di Andrea Carrera in Alcamo; In: Archivio storico siciliano Ser. NS, vol. 9 (1884) p. 218-223
31. Un'illustrazione degli affreschi del duomo di Alcamo scritta nel secolo # Firenze: Tipografia pei minori corrigendi, 1906
32. Vincenzo Iemma: letterato alcamese della prima meta del secolo # Palermo: Tip. del Giornale di Sicilia, 1882

== See also ==
- Vincenzo Regina
- Francesco Maria Mirabella
- Carlo Cataldo
- Alcamo

== Sources ==
- Carlo Cataldo: La Casa del Sole p. 296-303; editore Campo, Alcamo, 1999
- Carlo Cataldo: La conchiglia di S.Giacomo p. 201-202; ed. Campo, Alcamo, 2001
- Andrea Chiarelli, Dario Cocchiara: Alcamo nel XX secolo volume I; editore Campo, Alcamo, 2005
