= Saverio Marchese (disambiguation) =

Saverio Marchese (1757–1833) was a Maltese man of letters and nobleman.

Saverio Marchese may also refer to:

- Saverio Marchese (painter) (1806–1859), with works in San Tommaso Apostolo, Enna and Chiesa delle Anime Sante, Enna
- Saverio Marchese di Piro, Major of the Royal Malta Fencible Artillery, featured in the 1882 Birthday Honours
