= Basilica of Santa Maria Assunta, Alcamo =

Roman Catholic Basilica in Alcamo, Italy

Basilica of Santa Maria Assunta
- Basilica di Santa Maria Assunta
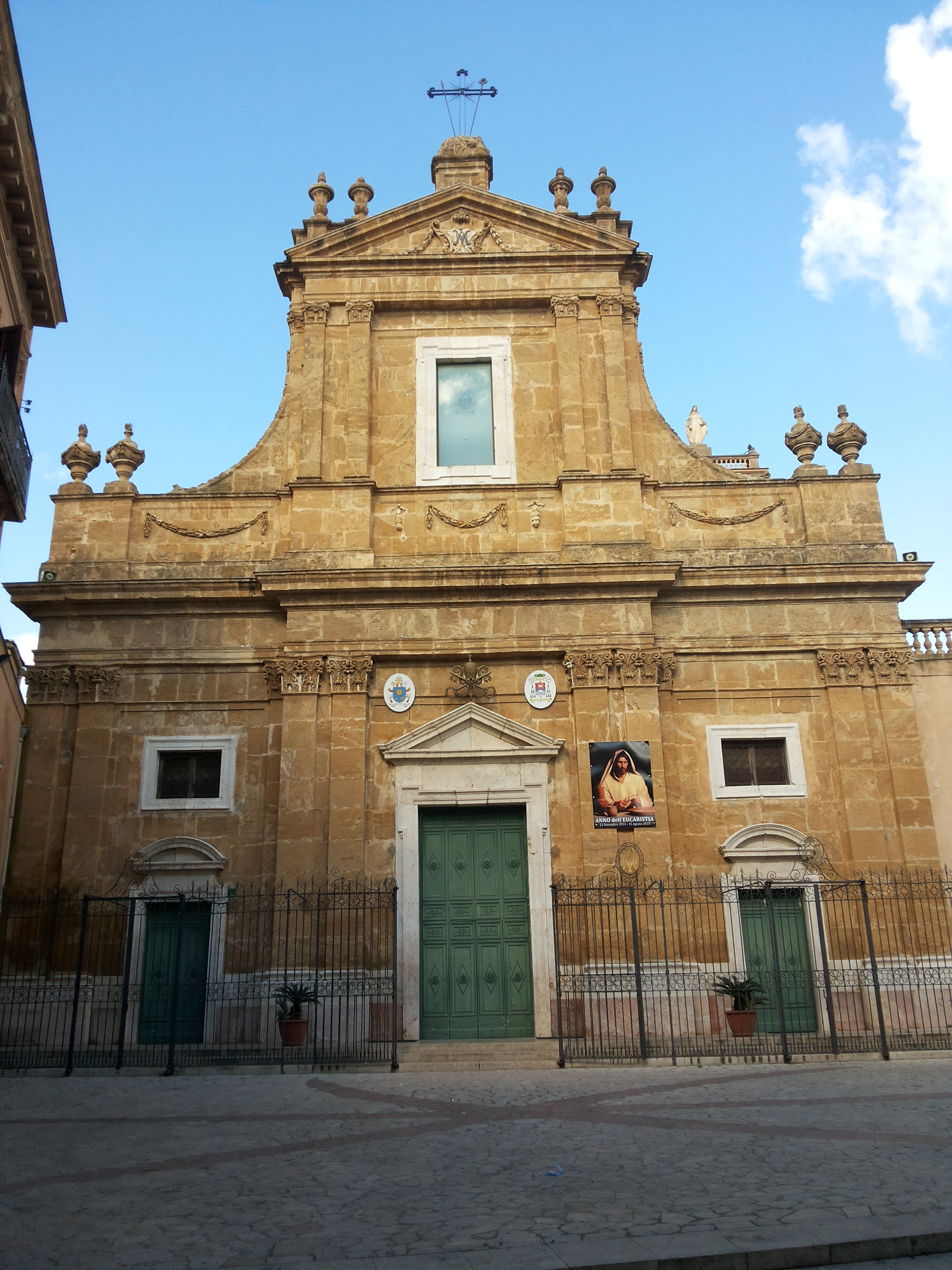
- Façade of Basilica of Our Lady's Assumption

Religion
- Affiliation: Roman Catholic
- Province: province of Trapani
- Region: Sicily

Location
- Location: Alcamo, province of Trapani, Italy
- State: Italy
- Interactive map of Basilica of Santa Maria Assunta
- Territory: Alcamo
- Coordinates: 37.980971°N 12.965526°E

Architecture
- Groundbreaking: 1332

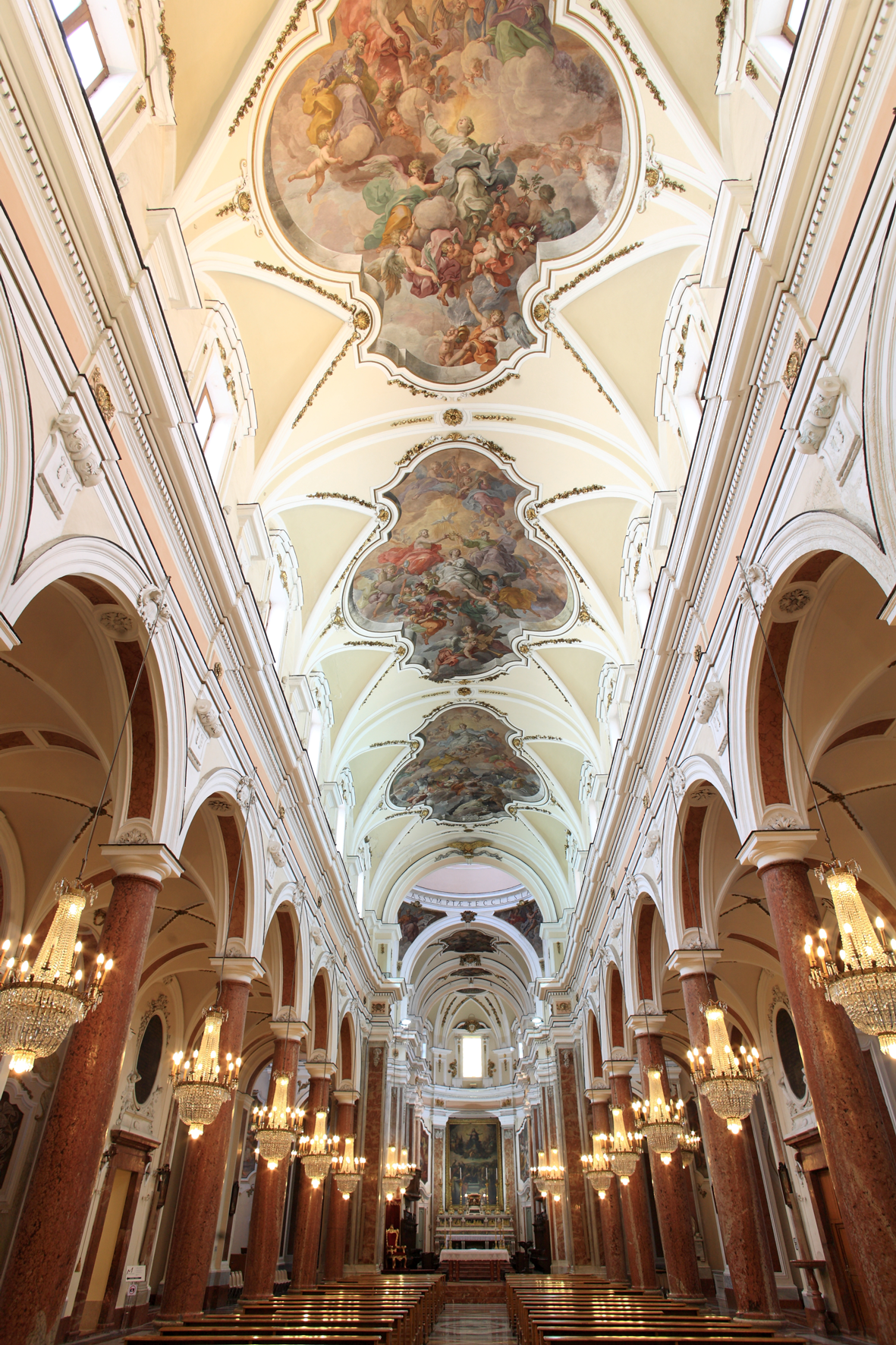
Colonnade and frescoes on the vaulted roof.

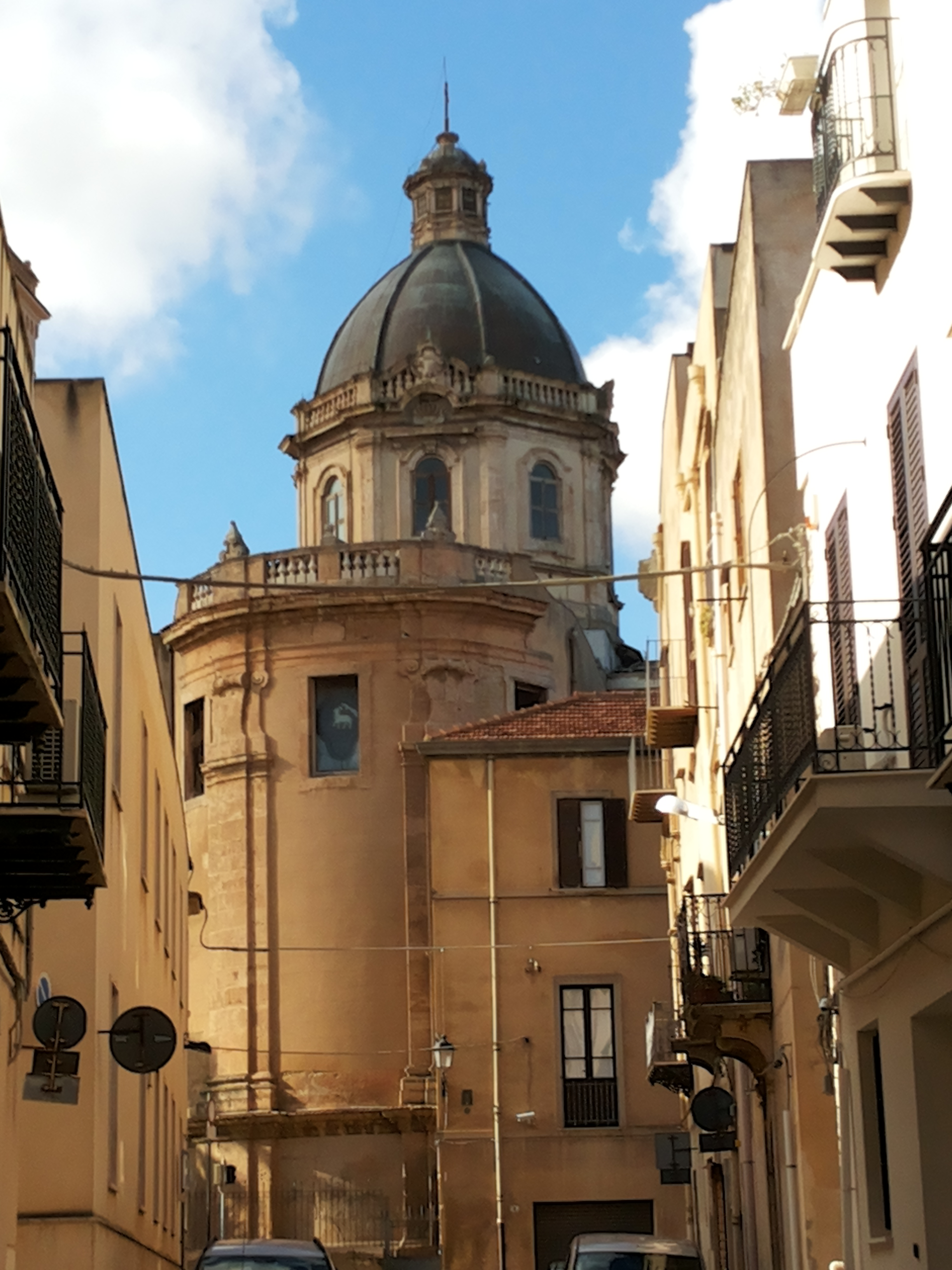
Side view of the dome.

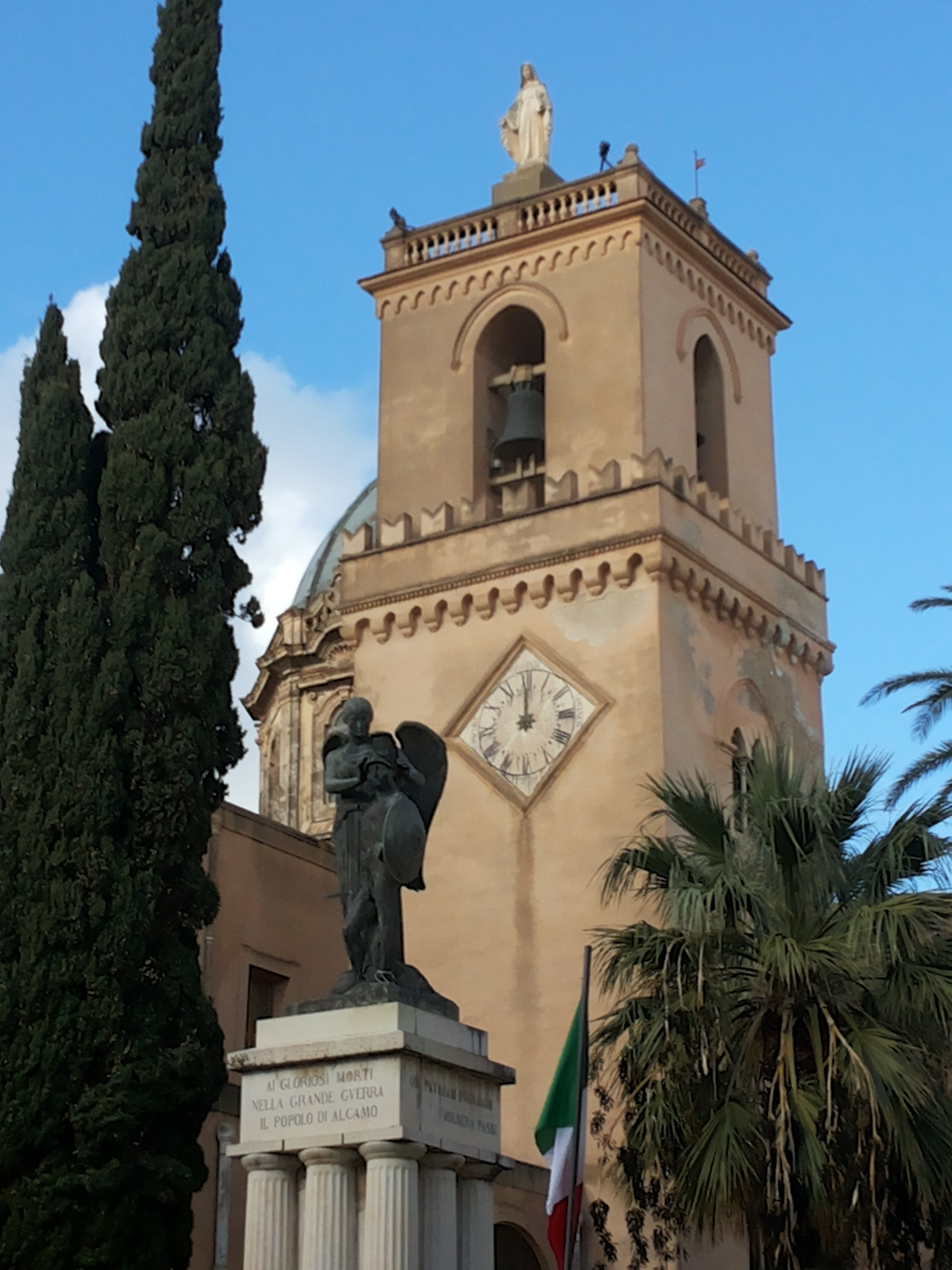
Bell tower contiguous with the church.

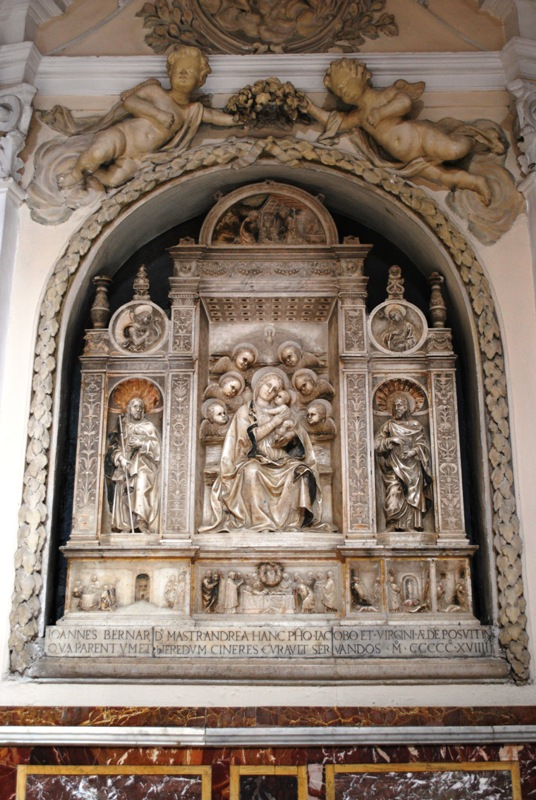
Triptych of Our Lady between the Saints Philip and James.

The Basilica of Saint Mary of the Assumption (Italian: Basilica of Santa Maria Assunta) is a 14th-century basilica in Alcamo, province of Trapani, Sicily, southern Italy. It is dedicated to the Blessed Virgin Mary assumed into Heaven.

Pope Paul VI raised the shrine to the status of Minor Basilica via the Pontifical decree Qui Consideret Quamvis on 13 May 1969. The decree was signed and notarized by Cardinal Luigi Traglia.

== History ==
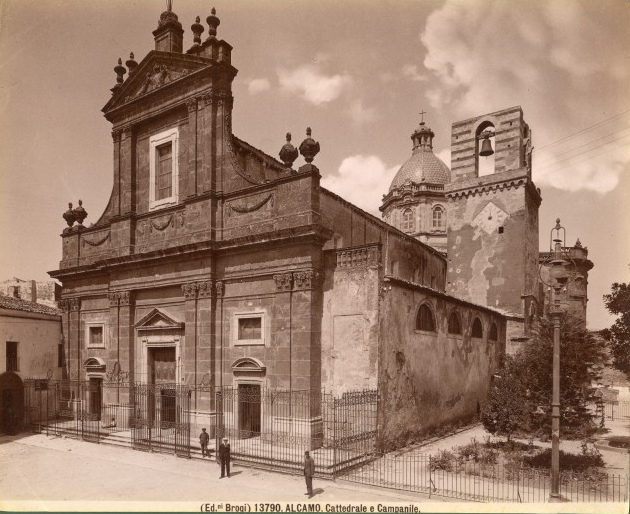
The Church in the first years of the 20th century: it is visible the high part of the bell tower, modified in 1942, and the dome's majolica coating.

The first mother church of Alcamo, positioned on the north side of the quarter of San Vito, was first dedicated to Our Lady Source of Mercy (Santa Maria Fonte della Misericordia, 1200) and then to Our Lady with the Star (Madonna della Stella). This Church is still existing under the name of Santa Maria della Stella, though in a state of abandonment.

In 1332, the inhabitants of quarter of San Vito moved near the castle of the Counts of Modica, and for this reason a new mother church was built in the same place where the present one is located and it is dedicated to Our Lady of the Assumption. This church opened to worship in 1402, was built in a Catalan-Gothic style with a nave and two side aisles and had a wooden ceiling and side chapels not aligned. It was enlarged and modified in 1471, 1530-1558 and 1581.

Today we can only see the bell tower with double lancet windows (restored in 1942), the chapel of the Holy Thorn and the Baptistery.

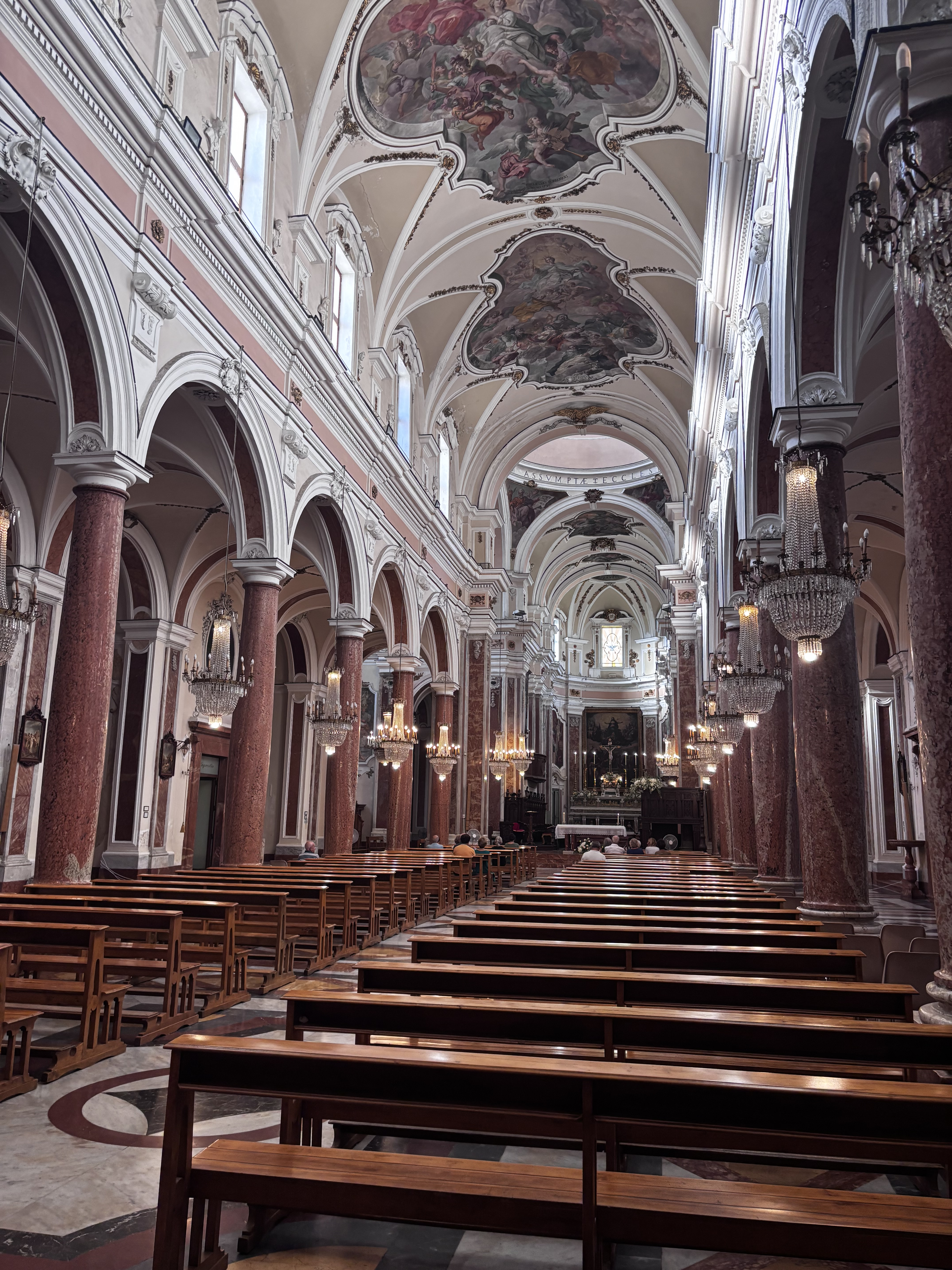
Interior of the Cathedral

About the 16th century it gave the name to one of the four districts in which Alcamo was divided, the so-called "Maggiore Chiesa".

In 1602 in this Church they founded the company of Santa Maria dello Stellario (Our Lady of Stellario), formed by countrymen ("villani") and butchers ("macellai"), transferred to church of Stellario in 1625.

The church was rebuilt in 1669 by Archduke Joseph and Angelo Italia (an architect from the Society of Jesus), while the neo-classical façade was realized in 1786 by Emanuele Cardona.

In 1918 in the mother church they founded the congregation of the Sacramentines, then the congregation of Ursulines (1919) and the Assuntines (1936).

Until the first half of the 20th century, the dome was covered with majolica tiles, later replaced with copper plates. In 1954, year of Mary, on the first centenary of the introduction of the Immaculate Conception's dogma, a 3-metre-high (9.8 ft) statue of the Madonna was placed on the bell tower.

In May 1969 the Church of Our Lady's Assumption was elected as a basilica.

The garden adjoining the church, since the 15th century, was used as a cemetery for poor people, with an altar where to celebrate Mass during maladies and a stone cross with an aedicula sacred to Our Lady of Mercy. In the 20th century it became a public garden and in 1929 they placed the War Memorial, realized by Bentivegna, a sculptor from Sciacca.

== Description and works ==
The church has a basilican plan with a nave and two side aisles which are divided by two rows of columns with monolithic marble shafts extracted from the near mount Bonifato. The stuccoes were made by the Curtis, while the floor was realized on the architect Giuseppe Patricolo's plan.

The interior contains 38 frescos by Guglielmo Borremans; in particular the three frescoes on the vault, realized by Borremans in 1735, represent Our Lady's Assumption with the Holy Trinity and the Saints Anne and Joachim, John the Baptist, David and the patriarchs, Cherubs, Angels and Archangels (in the first space), The Virgin's Coronation with the Eucharistic Word in her bosom, the Holy Trinity and Angels (in the second space) and Our Lady the Queen crowned and sitting among the clouds, holding a sceptre with Saint Peter on the right and Saint Paul on the left and male and female saints who founded religious or monastic orders, with Saint Rosalia (in the third space).
Besides the frescoes, there are other works by Borremans and in particular:

- The Cana's wedding and the miracle of the loaves and fishes (in the side walls of the Holy Sacrament's chapel)
- The Catholic Faith assisted by the Paraclete, crowned with flowers and carried shoulder-high (on the vault of the chapel of the Holy Sacrament)
- The four evangelists with their symbols writing a motto from the Gospel in honour of Mary (in the spaces above the big marble pillars)
- Angels with the pontifical insignia and Saint Peter's Chair supported by four animals of Apocalypse (on the vault of Saint Peter's chapel)
- Melchisedech blessing Abraham, Moses and the crossing of the Red Sea, Elijah making fire to fall on the altar and the Jewish pontiff sitting on Moses' Chair and assisted by his priests while some lepers, prostrated in front of him, are discovering their sores (in the side space under the cornice of Saint Peter's chapel )
- A group of Angels with the instruments of Passions and the Archangel Michael with the shining Cross and surrounded by Seraphs (On the vault of the Crucified's chapel)
- Abel's death, Abraham's sacrifice, the story of the bronze snake and Samson's death (in the side space under the cornice of the Crucified's chapel)
- The Virgin Mary with the Eucharistic Word in her bosom and the Holy Spirit in the shape of a bright flame on her head with angels prostrated, the Virgin in glory on the right of the divine Son passing a sceptre to her and the Paraclete in the shape of a dove between two angels scattering roses waiting the Virgin, beloved bride (on the vault of the greater bigger chapel)
- John, in ecstasy at Patmos, the angel with a golden reed pointing at the celestial Jerusalem in gold and gems with the life tree, illuminated by the divine Lamb's light (in the interior wall above the major door)
- Abigail calming down David's anger against Nabal, her husband, and Booz giving some wheat to Ruth the Moabite (inside the chapel of Our Lady of Rosary)

The Church has 5 chapels in the left nave, 6 in the right one and 6 in the area next to the apse. In the past the chapels belonged to some local families that had the duty of preserving and embellishing them. Besides, they were used by the proprietary families as their graves. They were all noblemen except for the Abbati family.

Plan of the basilica of Basilica of Our Lady of the Assumption A: main door B: side doors C: exit under the bell tower D: sacristy and Museum of Holy Art entrance 1-6: right nave chapels 7: right transept 8, 9, 11, 12: chapels next to the apse 10: apse 13: left transept 14-18: left nave chapels.

On the right nave of the church there are:

1. The Chapel of Privilege which belonged to the Mastrandrea family and contains the marble altarpiece carved by Antonello Gagini in 1519, with the triptych of Madonna between the Saints Philip and Jamesand Dormitio Virginis in predella and two portraits on canvas with Saint Carlo Borromeo and Saint Philip dating back to the 17th century.
2. Saint Lucy's chapel which belonged to the De Ballis family. Inside there are two sarcophaguses: the first is the chapel's founder' tomb (Giovannello De Ballis') and the second is Graziano De Ballis' tomb (his son). There are also two paintings of Don Giovanni and his brother Giuseppe De Ballis, dating back to the first half of the 17th century and ascribed to Filippo Paladini.
3. Saints Crispino and Crispiniano's chapel: contains a canvas painting of Saints Crispino and Crispiniano made in 1776 by Tommaso Pollaci.
4. The Crucifix's chapel: it holds the Abundance Crucifix, realized by Antonello Gagini between 1519 and 1523. It was made in mixture, and is a copy of another one inside the church of San Domenico in Palermo and realized by the Matinati family.
5. Our Lady of Fatima's chapel: it holds a wooden statue by L.Santifaller (1949) and a painting representing Our Lady of Graces made by Giovan Leonardo Bagolino (Sebastiano Bagolino' father) in 1566.
6. Giuseppe Rizzo's chapel: built on the architect Paolo Portoghesi's design and unveiled in 1995. It contains a modern architectural work dedicated to don Giuseppe Rizzo (founder of the homonymous bank ) and his mortal remains.

Next to the apse there are:

7. The Sacred Heart of Jesus' chapel, with a wooden statue by L.santifaller (1955) situated in the right transept.
8. The Holy Thorn's Chapel (called "the Holy Spirit's Chapel" in the past): built in 1430 at the behest of Palma de Gambono and then passed to the Marcanza family (owners of Church of Saint Thomas the Apostle) thanks to a wedding. It was bricked up in the first years of the 18th century and opened again in 1958. Besides the fresco of Pentecost realized by an unknown author, it holds a silver reliquary dating back to 1636, containing the "Holy Thorn". According to the legend, it belonged to Jesus Christ's thorn crown and was brought here by Charles V in 1535. The story tells that the thorn arrived together with two other thorns and that they were burnt by order of Girolamo de Terminis, the bishop of Mazara and only one remained undamaged, so proving its authenticity.
9. The Holy Sacrament's chapel: it holds the painting of the Last Supper made by Giuseppe Carrera in 1614.
10. Apse: it holds the canvas painting of the Assumption (1605), ascribed to Francesco da Castello and the wooden choir, realized in 1748.
11. Our Lady of Miracles' chapel: there is a wooden statue of the Madonna carved by Lorenzo Curti in 1720. The statue is taken in procession during the festivity of Our Lady of Miracles on 21 June. which is the most important feast in Alcamo.
12. Saint Anne's chapel: with the two sarcophagi of Giovanni and Giuseppe De Ballis, brothers, dating back to the 16th century.
13. Saint Peter's chapel, in the left transept : there are an altar, Saint's Peter's statue made by Giacomo Gagini in 1586 and Saint Vincent's body (a martyr). Next to the altar, there is also a crypt, that once could be visited and where priests were buried.

Instead in the left nave (starting from the chapel nearest to the altar) there are:

14. Saint Francis' chapel containing the fresco of Our Lady of the Snows, by an unknown author at the end of the 14th century.
15. The Four Crowned Men's chapel: it holds the painting of the Four Saints, made by Filippo Randazzo in 1737.
16. Chapel of Our Lady of Trapani (or Our Lady of Graces): contains a marble statue of Our Lady with a Child by Giuseppe Marino (1730) and a bas-relief of Dormitio Virginis, sculpted in 1529 by Antonello Gagini.
17. Chapel of Our Lady of Carmine: there are two paintings by Guglielmo Borremans and the wooden statue of Our Lady of Carmelo, realized between the end of the 17th century and the early years of the 18th century.
18. Chapel of Our Lady of Light: it belonged to the Abbati family and holds a marble baptistry, made by Antonello Gagin at the beginning of the 16th century, and the painting of Our Lady of Light made by Giuseppe Renda. at the end of the 18th century.

In the sacristy there are some works ascribed to Bartolomeo Berrettaro, such as the statue of Holy Mary's Aid and the portal lunette from the ex Church of Holy Mary's Aid. The 15th century portal of the bell tower is ascribed to Berrettaro, too. (1499).

== See also ==
- Sacred Art Museum

== Sources ==
- Longo, Ignazio (2010). La Maggiore Chiesa Parrocchiale della Città di Alcamo (in Italian). Gruppo Editoriale L'Espresso.
- Bembina, G.B.; Mirabella, Francesco Maria; Pietro Maria, Rocca (1956). Alcamo sacra (in Italian). Alcamo: Tipografia Cartografica. Archived from the original on 11 March 2016.
- Vitella, Maurizio (2011). Il Museo d'Arte Sacra della Basilica Santa Maria Assunta di Alcamo (in Italian). Trapani: il pozzo di giacobbe. ISBN 978-88-6124-306-4.
- Cataldo, Carlo (2001). La conchiglia di S. Giacomo (in Italian) (Edizioni Campo ed.). Alcamo.
- Regina, Vincenzo (1956). La Chiesa Madre di Alcamo: notizie storiche e artistiche (in Italian). Edizioni Accademia di Studi Ciullo.
- Calia, Roberto; Craparo, Enzo; Baldassano Cataldo, Erina (1991). La Bella Alcamo (in Italian). Alcamo: Edizioni Blu Imaging & Adv.
- Abbate, Francesco (2002). Storia dell'arte nell'Italia meridionale, Volume 4 (in Italian). Donzelli Editore. ISBN 88-7989-720-9.
- Rocca, Pietro Maria (1882). Di alcuni stuccatori che lavoravano in Alcamo nel secolo 18°: notizie e documenti. Palermo: Tipografia Virz.
