= Borremans =

Borremans is a Belgian surname. Notable people with the surname include:

- Charles Borremans (1769–1827), Flemish/Dutch composer
- Colonel Borremans Belgian military commander
- Guglielmo Borremans (1670–1744), Flemish painter
- Guilielmus Borremans, 17th-century Flemish choir-master and composer
- Jean Borremans (1911–1968), Belgian minister after World War II
- Joseph Borremans (1775–1858), Flemish/Dutch composer
- Laurence Borremans (born 1978), former Miss Belgium
- Nicolaes Borremans (c. 1614–1679), Dutch poet and editor
- Michaël Borremans (born 1963), Belgian painter
- Raymond Borremans (1906–1988), French musician, globe-trotter and encyclopaedist
