= Vincenzo Regina =

Italian Roman Catholic priest

Monsignor Vincenzo Regina (Alcamo, 9 May 1910 – Alcamo, 3 August 2009) was an Italian presbyter and historian.

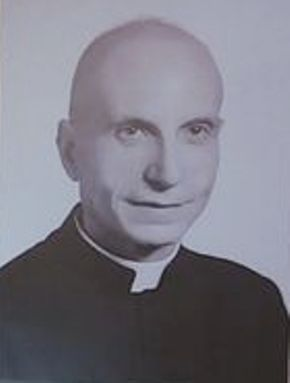
Vincenzo Regina

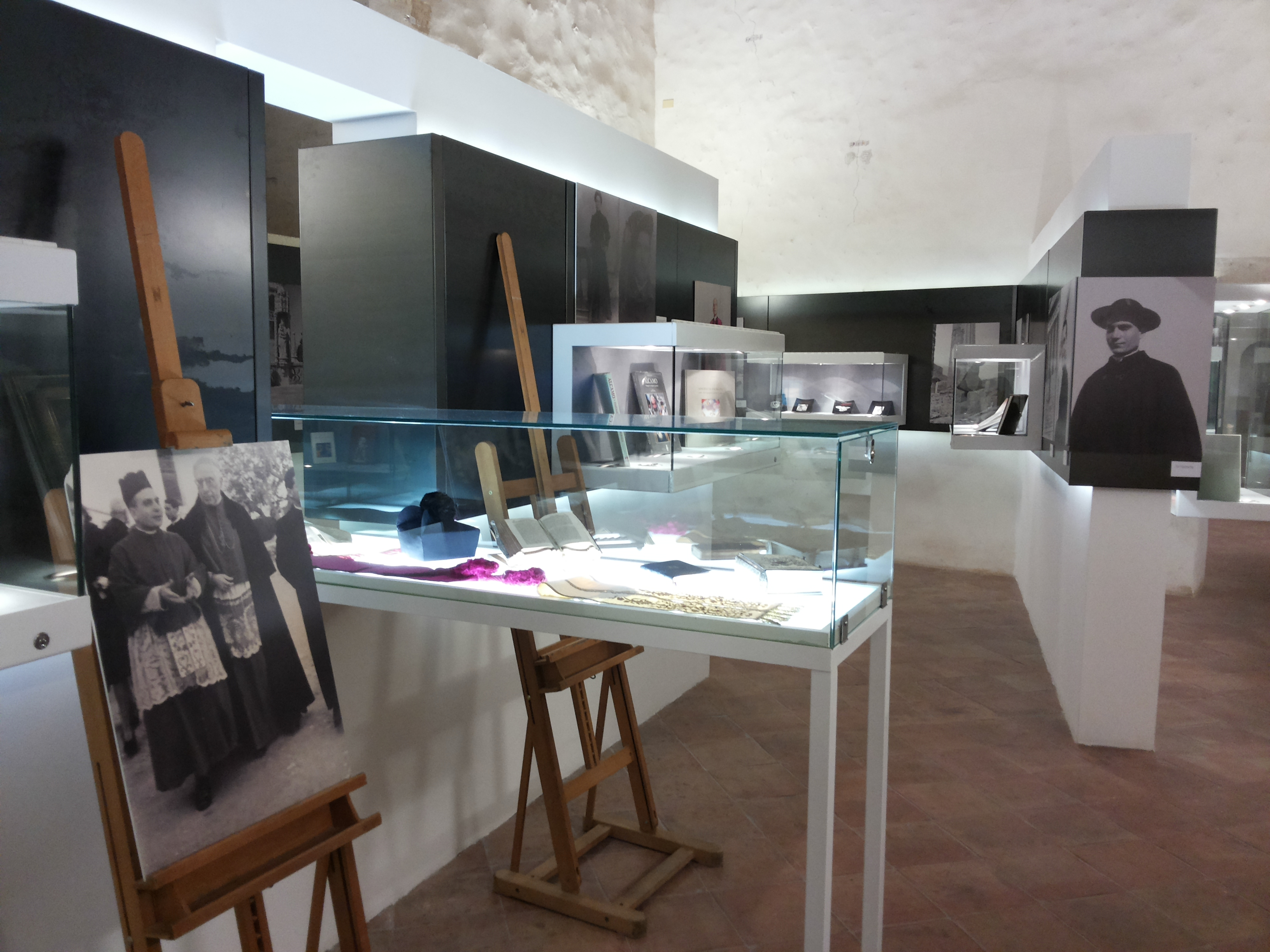
Exhibition on Monsignor Regina

== Biography ==
He was a figure of the clergy in Alcamo. He was ordained a priest in December 1932, when Alcamo still belonged to the Diocese of Mazara del Vallo. He devoted himself to believers and studies, he also taught Letters at the Gymnasium for three years and dogmatic theology in the seminary of Mazara del Vallo from 1937 until 1944.

A protagonist of the last 80 years in the history of Alcamo (as archpriest and parson for 47 years), he gave a stimulus to the Azione Cattolica and other parish associations.

He was a consultant of the Ministry of Cultural Heritage and Activities and Tourism and published several tens of books on the history, arts and representative figures of Alcamo, handing down, in this way, a patrimony of information for young people. Besides, thanks to his continual work of collecting, they could create the Sacred Art Museum in the Basilica of Our Lady of the Assumption.

In 2007, he published a new book with the title L'associazione antiracket e antiusura alcamese. Istituzione provvidenziale, an answer to the decalogue of the "perfect Mafioso" who discovered inside the den of the boss Salvatore Lo Piccolo. In 2004, he had published another book along the same lines: Arpie del racket. Vampiri dell'usura with documents on the foundation of the Associazione Antiracket e Antiusura of Alcamo.

== The Sacred Art Museum ==
In the former premises of the Oratory of the Confraternity of Santissimo Sacramento (Very Holy Sacrament). In the hall of the old Oratory, with a modern and appropriate lighting system, they have arranged, all by date, paintings, statues, Church furnishings, vestments dating back to the beginning of the 15th century and the second half of the 19th century.

These artworks were collected by monsignor Vincenzo Regina, archpriest from 1944 to 1991; in accordance with the suggestions of Second Vatican Council about the care and attention for the ecclesiastical artistic patrimony, after the 1968 Belice earthquake he started collecting various paintings, sculptures and works of different kind, coming from churches that were unfit for use.

== Recognitions and offices ==
- Honorary inspector for Monuments from 1945 to 1988
- Prize to Culture 1971, presented by the Presidency of the Council of Ministers.
- Member of the National Council of the Ministry of Cultural Heritage and Activities and Tourism
- Member of the Committee of Sector for Environmental and Architectural Heritage
- Member of the Commission for the awarding of Certificates of Merit for Art and Culture
- Member of the National Commission for the safeguard of old Organs in Italy.

== Works ==
- Gli affreschi di Guglielmo Borremans nella Chiesa madre di Alcamo (simbolismo e significato; Mazara, Tip. B. Grillo, 1944
- La Chiesa madre di Alcamo : notizie storiche e artistiche; prefazione di Filippo Pottino, Alcamo: Accademia di studi Ciullo, 1956
- Brevi note su Alcamo del 1700; prefazione di Nicolo Domenico Evola, Alcamo: Accademia di studi Ciullo, 1956
- Giuseppe Renda, l'Aroddu: pittore alcamese del secolo 18°; prefazione di Alessandro Giuliana Alajmo; Accademia di studi Cielo di Alcamo, 1957
- La cappella quattrocentesca dello Spirito Santo nella chiesa madre di Alcamo / prefazione di Vincenzo Scuderi, Alcamo: Ediz. Accademia di studi Cielo d'Alcamo, 1960
- I pregevoli stucchi di Alcamo: da Giacomo Serpotta a Salvatore Raiano / prefazione di Giuseppe Cottone; Alcamo: Ediz. Accademia di studi Cielo D'Alcamo, 1962
- Il castello trecentesco dei conti di Modica in Alcamo; prefazione del prof. Virgilio Titone, Alcamo: Accademia di studi Cielo di Alcamo; ed. Boccone del Povero, Palermo, 1967
- Antonello Gagini e le sculture cinquecentesche in Alcamo, prefazione di Vincenzo Scuderi; Alcamo: Accademia di studi Cielo di Alcamo, 1969
- La Basilica di S. Maria Assunta in Alcamo; Alcamo: Edizioni Accademia di studi Cielo di Alcamo, 1969
- I cinquecenteschi codici miniati di Alcamo: al laboratorio di restauro del libro; Trapani: tip.Cartograf, 1971
- Profilo storico di Alcamo e le sue opere d'arte dalle origini al secolo 15.; prefazione di Paolo Collura; Accademia di Studi Cielo d'Alcamo, 1972, Trapani, Cartograf
- Storia, societa e cultura in Alcamo dal Cinque al Settecento; prefazione del ch.mo prof. Francesco Giunta, Alcamo: Accademia di studi Cielo D'Alcamo, 1975
- Del più antico reliquiario di Alcamo; 1976
- Ottocento alcamese : storia e arte; Accademia di studi Cielo D'Alcamo; Trapani: Cartograf, 1977
- Alcamo dalla prima guerra mondiale ai nostri giorni: appunti per la storia; presentazione di Francesco Brancato; Accademia di studi Cielo D'Alcamo, 1979
- Alcamo: storia, arte e tradizioni (Dalle origini al Cinquecento) vol.1: Palermo: Sellerio editore, (1980)
- Alcamo: storia, arte e tradizioni (Seicento e Settecento) vol. 2: Palermo: Sellerio editore, (1980)
- Alcamo: storia, arte e tradizioni (Dall'Ottocento all'autonomia siciliana) vol.3: Palermo: Sellerio editore, (1980)
- La più antica cinquecentina illustrata di Alcamo; Alcamo, 1980
- Longarico, Bonifato e Alcamo: storia bimillenaria di un popolo, Alcamo, 1982 (Trapani: Cartograf)
- Bonifato terra sicana elima : da Longuro a Longarico; Alcamo, 1982
- Alcamo e le sue opere d'arte, Moncalieri: Jemmagrafica, 1983
- Il Museo alcamese d'arte sacra nella sua interpretazione storica teologica ed ecclesiologica; prefazione di Giovanni Fallani, Alcamo, 1984
- Calatubo dalla protostoria ai nostri giorni; Alcamo, 1985 (Trapani: Cartograf)
- Alcamo: paesaggio urbano e rurale; fotografie di Vincenzo Brai; Palermo: Leopardi, 1986
- Alcamo: immagini di religiosità popolare; fotografie di Melo Minnella; Palermo: Aracne, 1987
- Don Giuseppe Rizzo e l'azione sociale dei cattolici dal 1860 al 1912; Palermo, Aracne, 1988
- Angeli e demoni nelle arti figurative della Sicilia; fotografie di Melo Minnella, Palermo: Aracne, 1989
- Brevi note sugli organi antichi e storici della provincia di Trapani; prefazione del maestro Arturo Sacchetti; Alcamo, 1991(Trapani: Cartograf)
- Alcamo: una città della Sicilia / Vincenzo Regina; prefazione di Massimo Ganci; fotografie di Melo Minnella, Palermo: Aracne, 1992
- Memoriale per la storia e l'arte: un insigne monumento salvato da tutelare; Alcamo, 1992 (Trapani: Tipolito Cartograf)
- Maria Maddalena nella storia, nella tradizione, nella leggenda e nelle arti figurative della provincia di Trapani; Alcamo, 1993
- Una compagnia quattro volte centenaria e l'Immacolata nel culto e nell'iconografia alcamese, Alcamo ed.Cartograf,1995
- Erice: cittadella dell'arte, della scienza e della solidarieta; foto di Melo Minnella, Palermo: Aracne (1995)
- Erice: cittadella dell'arte, della scienza e della solidarieta; foto di Melo Minnella; presentazione di Salvo Amoroso; introduzione di Vincenzo Adragna; Messina: Helios, (1996)
- Considerazioni storiche sugli argenti, i parati, sul museo alcamese d'arte sacra; Alcamo, 1996
- Il Santuario di Alcamo, 1997
- Alcamo:la chiesa di S. Oliva nella storia e nell'arte dei Gagini, di Pietro Novelli e di Giovan Biagio Amico; 1997 (Trapani: Cartogram)
- La chiesa parrocchiale di Sant'Anna in Alcamo: storia ed arte; Trapani: Cartogram, 1997
- I luoghi liturgici della Basilica di S. Maria Assunta Chiesa Madre di Alcamo; 1999 (Paceco: Abate)
- Alcamo la chiesa di Maria Santissima Annunziata; Gibellina: Edizioni Fondazione Orestiadi, 1999
- Guida alla lettura delle opere d'arte: Basilica di S. Maria Assunta Alcamo, Paceco (TP): Stampa Litotipografica Abate, 1999
- Il culto di S. Francesco di Paola in Alcamo: 450 anni di storia; Alcamo, Tipolitografia Sarograf, 2000
- Il culto eucaristico in Alcamo dal Cinquecento ai nostri giorni: spigolature artistiche e storiche; Alcamo: Sarograg, 2000
- La Chiesa di Maria Santissima del Rosario e i Domenicani in Alcamo;Paceco, Litotipografia Abate, 2000
- Le silografie d'una cinquecentina rubata e ritrovata; Alcamo, Grafiche Campo, 2001
- Cavalieri ospedalieri e pellegrini per le antiche vie della provincia di Trapani; 2002 (Alcamo: Arti grafiche Campo)
- Don Giuseppe Rizzo maestro di spiritualità; Alcamo, Campo, 2002
- Don Giuseppe Rizzo politico e giornalista; Alcamo, artigrafichecampo, 2003
- Arpie del racket vampiri dell'usura; Alcamo: Associazione antiracket e antiusura alcamese, 2004
- L'organo a sette tastiere di Francesco La Grassa nella chiesa di S. Pietro a Trapani; 2004 (Alcamo: Arti grafiche Campo)
- La chiesa di San Pietro in Alcamo e l'architetto Giovan Biagio Amico; 2004 (Alcamo: Arti Grafiche Campo)
- La Chiesa parrocchiale ed il Convento di S. Maria di Gesù in Alcamo : storia e arte; 2005 (Alcamo: Campo)
- La chiesa parrocchiale del Sacro Cuore di Gesù in Alcamo e il suo primo parroco; 2005 (Alcamo: Campo)
- La chiesa parrocchiale di San Giuseppe in Alcamo; 2005, Alcamo ed. Campo
- Il ventennale del Centro sociale terza età "Giovanni Paolo 2."; Alcamo, 1985-2005; Alcamo: 2005 (Alcamo: Arti grafiche Campo)
- La chiesa della Madonna dell'Alto sul monte Bonifato; 2005, Alcamo, ed. Campo
- La chiesa parrocchiale di San Michele Arcangelo in Erice - Casa Santa e il suo parroco; 2006, Alcamo ed. Campo
- Mafia e antimafia nella storia di Alcamo, 2006
- Usi e costumi tradizionali, 2006
- L'approvvigionamento idrico di Alcamo : notizie storiche utili per la soluzione di un ricorrente problema; 2006 (Alcamo: Arti Grafiche Campo)
- Gli avvenimenti del Novecento nella vita e nella storia d'un alcamese quasi centenario / Giuseppe e Vincenzo Regina; Alcamo, Campo, 2006
- Pregate così, 2007
- L'Associazione Antiracket e Antiusura alcamese, istituzione provvidenziale, 2007
- Antiche leggende in opere d'arte sacra alcamese; 2007 (Alcamo: Campo)
- Il castello di Alcamo, 2007
- Fondatori di Ordini Religiosi. Affresco di Guglielmo Borremans
- Le avventure di due innamorati nel Novecento. Romanzo storico; Alcamo: Campo, 2008
- Il collegio degli Studi dei Gesuiti in Alcamo; 2010; Alcamo: Grafiche Campo, 2010
- Monasteri femminili con chiese e opere d'arte in provincia di Trapani; foto di Melo Minnella, 245 pagine

== See also ==
- Alcamo
- Museo d'arte sacra (Alcamo)
- Basilica di Santa Maria Assunta (Alcamo)
- Giuseppe Rizzo (priest)

== Sources ==
- Di Natale M.C. Monsignor Vincenzo Regina e il Museo di Alcamo; In M. Vitella (a cura di), Museo d'arte sacra. Basilica Santa Maria Assunta (pp. 13–17); ed.Il Pozzo di Giacobbe, Trapani,2011
- Lo frutto, i 150 anni del Liceo Classico di Alcamo, a cura di Francesco Melia e Gaetano Stellino p. 80; ed. Campo; Alcamo, 2012
