= Giuseppe Rizzo (priest) =

Italian Catholic priest, politician and journalist

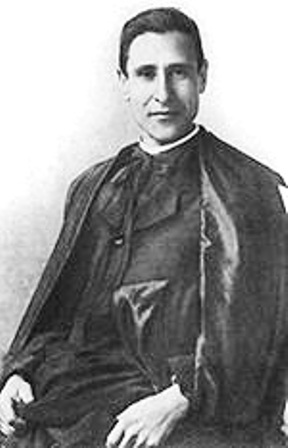
Giuseppe Rizzo

Don Giuseppe Rizzo (22 December 1863 in Alcamo – 17 April 1912 in Alcamo) was an Italian Catholic priest, politician and journalist.

== Biography ==
Don Rizzo was challenged early in his childhood, as his father was a humble workman and his mother died when he was only three years old. He attended the Royal Gymnasium (high school) in Alcamo and completed his philosophical and theological studies at the diocesan seminary of Mazara del Vallo, where he was ordained as a priest on 22 September 1888.

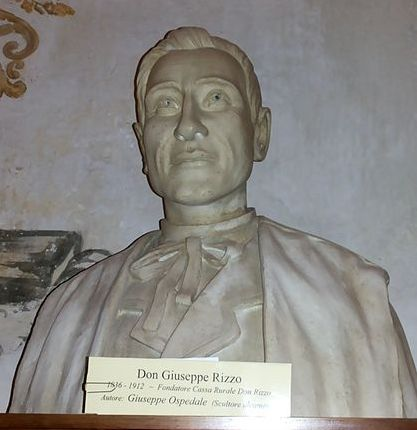
Bust of Don Rizzo inside the Civic Library

During the first years of his priesthood, he devoted himself to educating young people. He founded an oratory, dedicated to Saint Francis de Sales, and later the Association of Azione Cattolica "Don Bosco", to give an appropriate social, political, and religious formation to the young.

The association aimed at educating to an open and practical life as a Christian, studying and promoting the activities of Azione Cattolica, useful for the country according to the principles of Christian Democracy, willed by the Pope.

Following his election as a town councillor, he served as a mediator of peace between opposing parties; he trained people to vote freely and disinterestedly and worked for the moralisation of the town administration. Don Rizzo's life was never an easy one: he engaged himself as a banker, journalist, town councillor, and, obviously, a priest.

His activism was not well regarded by the conservatives of that period, and so Don Giuseppe was sent to prison, together with many other people, accused of being a subversive and the instigator of the popular uprising in January 1903 owing to the excise, for retail sale, which had become a slavery for people.

On 25 March of the same year, he was declared fully innocent and released. This dramatic experience weakened his body, but not his spirit; in fact, Don Rizzo resumed his activity with greater energy. He started a bank, Cassa Rurale ed Artigiana, a farmers cooperative and a consumer cooperative, to help his poor fellow citizens, who had suffered a serious economic crisis caused by the bankruptcy of two local banks (the Banca Segestana of Castellammare del Golfo and the Popolare Cooperativa of Alcamo) and major problems in the agricultural field, due to the Phylloxera. During his life, he always followed the spirit of the Gospel. He died prematurely on 17 April 1912 at the age of 49.

Following a decision by the bank's partners and board of directors in 1995, his ashes rest in the chapel inside the Basilica of Our Lady of the Assumption, built on a plan by the famous architect, professor Paolo Portoghesi, together with Paolo Borghi’s sculptures.

=== Banking ===
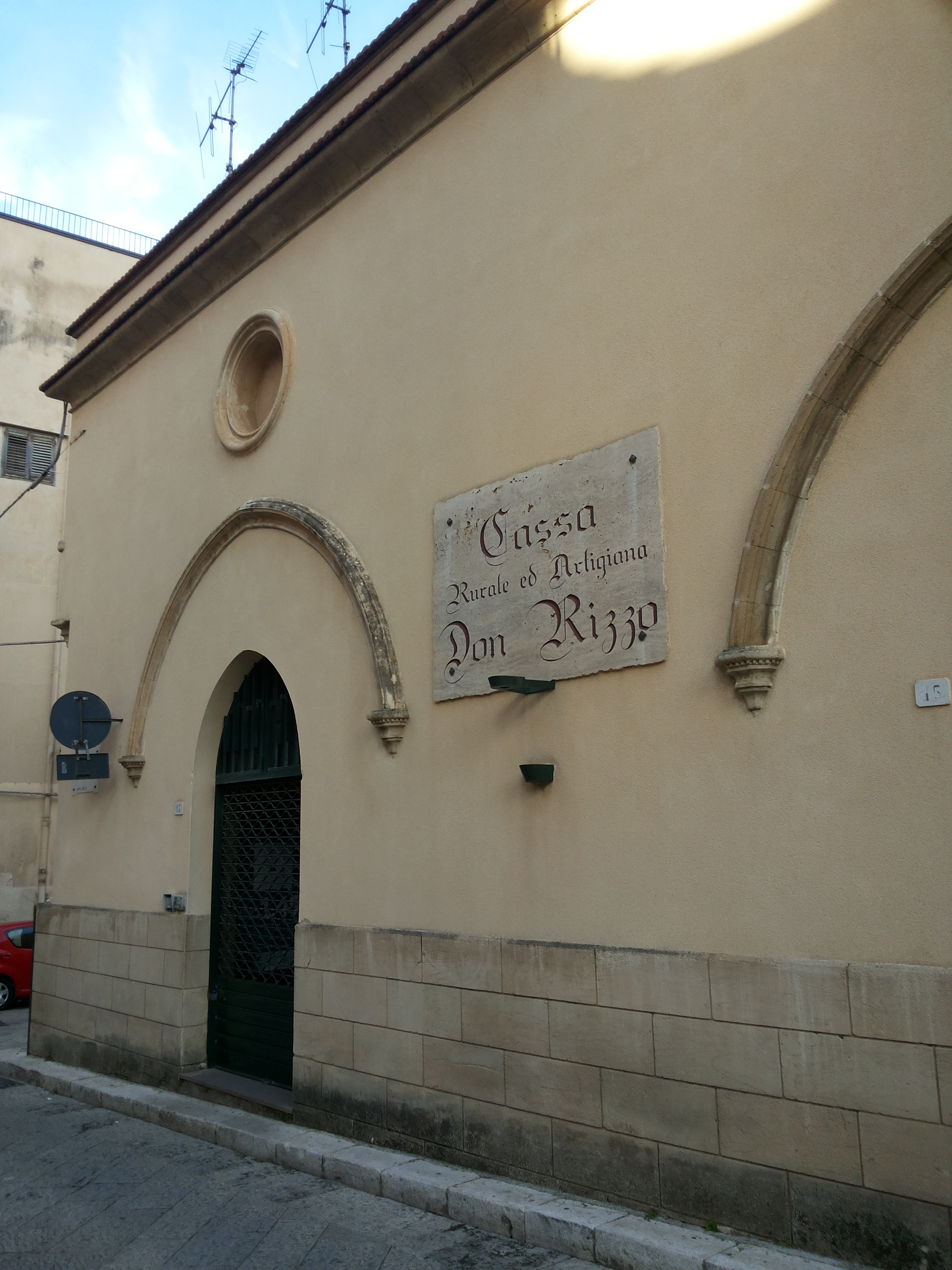
The historic location of the Bank

In Sicily, a small and motivated group of so-called social priests promoted some initiatives which had a remarkable social impact: their greatest success was the creation of banks that, above all, were willing to distribute agricultural credit.

In those years, access to credit was the Sicilian farmers' greatest problem: they were obliged to appeal to a rescue, an archaic form of anticipation that owners gave to farmers, but with an annual interest up to a level of 50 per cent or, in extreme cases, to usury. This made it very difficult for most farmers to build wealth.

In 1902, the bankruptcy of two local banks in Alcamo brought several people to ruin: it was on that occasion that don Giuseppe Rizzo thought to create the Cassa Rurale ed Artigiana, a cooperative bank with the goal of freeing the poor from usury.

From the beginning, Credit Unions have had a close relationship with a territory, linking their history with that of communities, enough to win the appellation of "local bank". The Banks of Cooperative Credit have structured themselves in a national system called Credit Union.

The Banca Don Rizzo is still active and has about 3,000 partners today, growing from the initial 24. The bank has opened 17 branches in several centres of the provinces of Trapani and Palermo.

== See also ==
- Pope Leo XIII
- Luigi Sturzo
- Christian Democracy (Italy)
- Italian People's Party
- Credit union
- Paolo Portoghesi
- Vincenzo Regina

== Sources ==
- Marsala Rosanna: Alle radici del popolarismo: Lo Cascio, Sturzo, Traina; G. Giappichelli Editore
- Vincenzo Regina: Don Giuseppe Rizzo politico e giornalista; artigrafichecampo, Alcamo, 2003
- Vincenzo Regina: Don Giuseppe Rizzo maestro di spiritualità; artigrafichecampo, Alcamo, 2002
- Vincenzo Regina: Don Giuseppe Rizzo e l'azione sociale dei cattolici dal 1860 al 1912; Aracne, 1988
