= Strasbourg Mosque =

Mosque in eastern France

Great Mosque of Strasbourg
- Grande Mosquée de Strasbourg

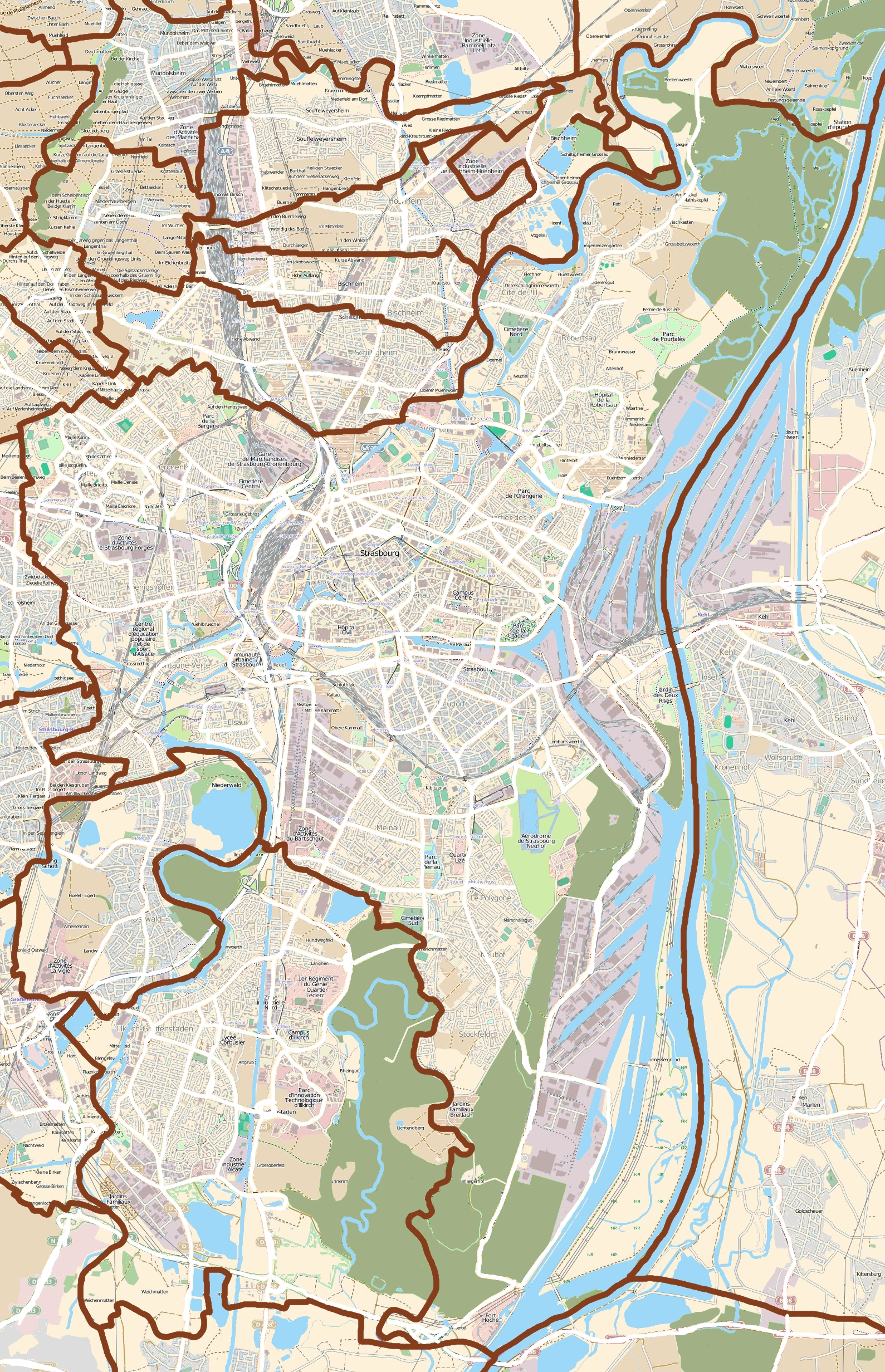
- Location of the mosque in Strasbourg

Religion
- Affiliation: Islam
- Ecclesiastical or organizational status: Mosque
- Status: Active

Location
- Location: Strasbourg
- Country: France
- Interactive map of Great Mosque of Strasbourg
- Coordinates: 48°34′23″N 7°44′14″E

Architecture
- Architect: Paolo Portoghesi
- Type: Mosque
- Groundbreaking: 29 October 2004
- Completed: 2012

Specifications
- Capacity: 1,200 worshipers
- Dome: 1

Website
- mosquee-strasbourg.com (in French)

The Strasbourg Mosque, also known as the Great Mosque of Strasbourg (French: Grande Mosquée de Strasbourg), is a large purpose-built mosque in the city of Strasbourg, France. It is located on the banks of the Ill river in the Heyritz area, south of the Grande Île. It was inaugurated in September 2012 and has a capacity of 1,200 worshipers.

== Overview ==
The mosque is frequented by Muslims of North Africa, mainly Moroccan origin. It hosts many conferences and seminars and has an extensive teaching programme for school-aged children.

The former mosque, in use from 1982 to 2012, consisted of a converted foie gras factory in the Impasse de mai in the centre of Strasbourg, near the law-courts. It was not the first mosque to be established in Strasbourg. There have been mosques in the city since 1967 and there are now over twenty.

== History ==
The mosque was designed by Paolo Portoghesi, who also designed the Mosque of Rome. The design competition included a futuristic proposal by Zaha Hadid. Construction was delayed several times, due to litigation with the main constructors and a decision by the centre-right municipal council of Mayor Fabienne Keller to prevent overseas funding. The first stone of the new mosque was laid on 29 October 2004 by Mayor Keller. She also revised the original building project, removing the planned study centre, auditorium and minaret and reducing the capacity of the prayer room by 50%.

== See also ==
- Islam in France
- List of mosques in France
