= Chiesa delle Anime Sante, Enna =

Roman Catholic church in Sicily, Italy

Coordinates: 37.56583°N 14.27526°E

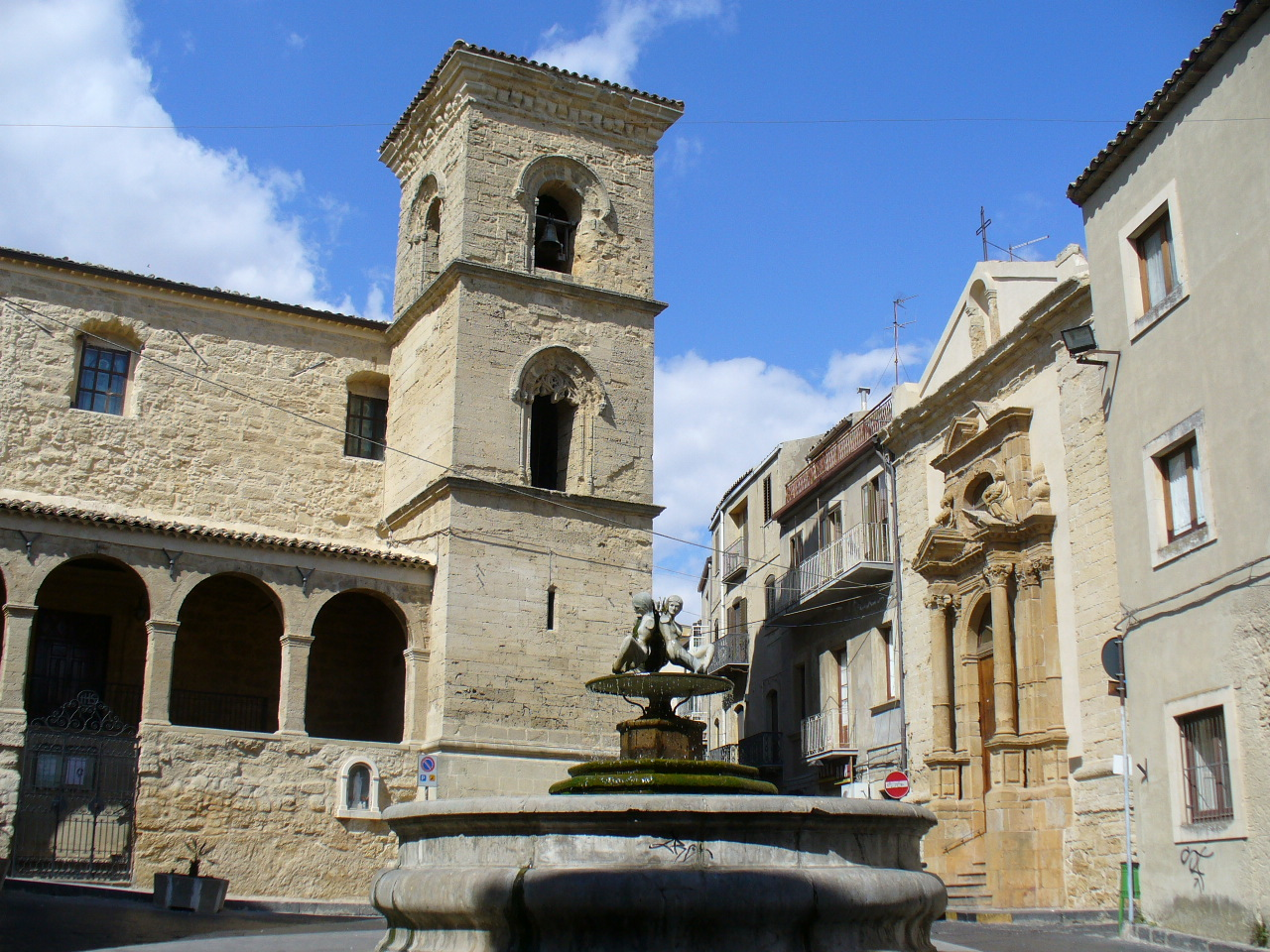
View from the Piazza Neglia of the fountain in foreground; on the left the bell-tower and portico of San Tommaso, and on the left the facade of Anime Sante.

The Chiesa delle Anime Sante del Purgatorio or Church of the Holy Souls in Purgatory is a Roman Catholic church (or oratory) located on the Piazza Francesco Paolo Neglia and Via del Mercato in the town of Enna in Sicily, Italy. At a diagonal, across the street stands the church of San Tommaso.

== History ==
In 1615–1616, permission to build a chapel or oratory dedicated for prayers of the (holy) Souls in Purgatory. Construction proceeded under the patronage of the Confraternity of the Anime Sante del Purgatorio. Construction of the present building only proceeded in 1671. The portal in pink stone was sculpted with baroque decoration and a split tympanum. The interior barrel vault is also richly decorated. The painter Guglielmo Borremans frescoed (1720–1723) the interior with depictions of the Glory with Madonna and Pope Urban VIII; Triumph of the Faith; and a Defeat of the Rebel Angels. The main altarpiece depicts a Purgatory by the 19th-century local painter Saverio Marchese. The 18th-century wooden pulpit is richly carved. The choir has a maiolica pavement.
