= Guglielmo Borremans =

Flemish painter (1670–1744)

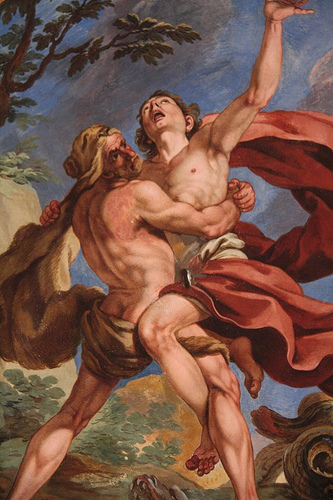
Mythological scene

Guglielmo Borremans or Guglielmo Fiamingo (1670–1744) was a Flemish painter whose documented career took principally place in the Kingdom of Naples, in particular Naples, Cosenza and in the Kingdom of Sicily. Here he was one of the pre-eminent late-Baroque fresco painters of the first half of the 17th century who received multiple commissions to decorate churches and palaces.

== Life ==
Little is known about the youth and training of Guglielmo Borremans. He is believed to have been born in Antwerp in 1670. Here he trained with the history painter Pieter van Lint around 1688–1689. A painting of the 'Martyrdom of St Andrew' formerly in the St Bavo's Cathedral, Ghent is the only documented work attributed to him dating to his residence in his home country. He likely did not leave Flanders before the end of the 17th century. The last evidence of the artist's presence in Antwerp is found in the records of the archives of the Academy of Fine Arts of Antwerp where he is recorded until 1693.

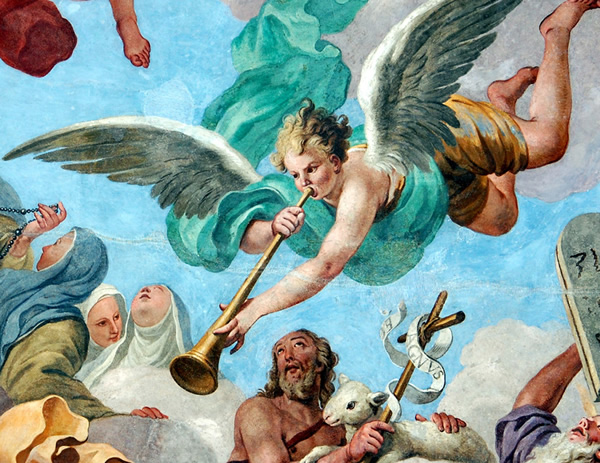
The Glory of Saint Vincent

The exact timing and details of his route to and in Italy are not clear. That the artist may have passed through Rome is made likely by a painting by his hand dated to 1703 that was formerly in the Consentino Duomo in Rome. He also spent time in Napoli and possibly in Cosenza, Calabria. At least 20 works dating from 1703 to 1706 are recorded in Cosenza. He may have had a link with the local members of the Franciscan order as most of his works in Calabria were commissioned by this religious order. In fact, these dated works painted in Cosenza are the earliest indication of his presence in southern Italy.

The only known paintings by Borremans in Naples are the fresco decorations in the crossing of the Santa Caterina a Formiello dating from around 1708–09. He was replacing Giuseppe Simonelli who had died not long before and had commenced the decoration of the crossing. The subject of the series were stories from the life of Saint Dominic.

He must have made quite a name for himself in Naples as the 1713 publication ‘'Selva poetica'’ by Giuseppe D'Alessandro, the Duke of Peschiolanciano, included a poem dedicated to the artist entitled "In lode del Signor Guglielmo Borremans, famoso pittore fiammingo" (‘"In praise of Mr. Guglielmo Borremans, famous Flemish painter'). The final verses of the poem refer to Borremans' skills at eternalizing the living and reviving the dead, which point to his activities as a portraitist in Naples. To date no painted portraits have been attributed to the artist other than the half-length portrait of the Archpriest Raffaele Riccobene in the altarpiece of the ‘'Immaculata with Angels and Saints'’ for the main altar of the Cathedral of Caltanissetta. Riccobene had funded the decoration of the Cathedral.

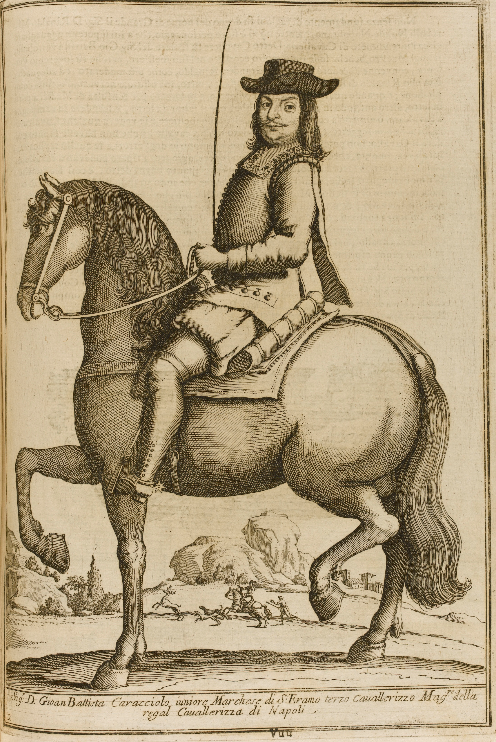
Don Giovanni Battista Caracciolo, iuniore marchese di s Eramo

The Duke of Peschiolanciano clearly had a close relationship with the artist. He likely invited Borremans to design the plates included in the Duke’s book on equestrianism called Pietra Paragone de cavalieri published in Naples in 1711. This book contains many plates relating to equestrianism that were cut by the prominent Neapolitan engraver Francesco De Grado after Borremans' designs. The book also includes portraits, 14 of which are equestrian portraits and 14 are bust portraits. It is possible that the reference in the Duke’s poem to portraits by Borremans relates to these designs for his Pietra Paragone de cavalieri.

Borremans moved to Sicily where he was recorded in Palermo in 1714 when he was commissioned to paint a fresco on the ceiling of the church of Our Lady of the Vault. In Sicily, he received multiple commissions to decorate the local churches and the palazzi of prominent personalities. He also painted many canvases. He must have operated a large workshop. He worked in various locations in Sicily outside Palermo including Nicosia, Catania, Enna, Caltanissetta, Buccheri, Caccamo and Alcamo. One of his largest projects was the decorations of the Chiesa di San Ranieri e dei Santi Quaranta Martiri Pisani in Palermo, a commission he commenced in 1725. In this church, he used a profusion of gold and stucco to create one of the richest and most lavish Baroque decorations in Sicily. This is the only work he signed with a signature which refers to his homeland: "Guglielmus Borremans Antuerpiensis Pinxit" ('Painted by Willem Borremans of Antwerp').

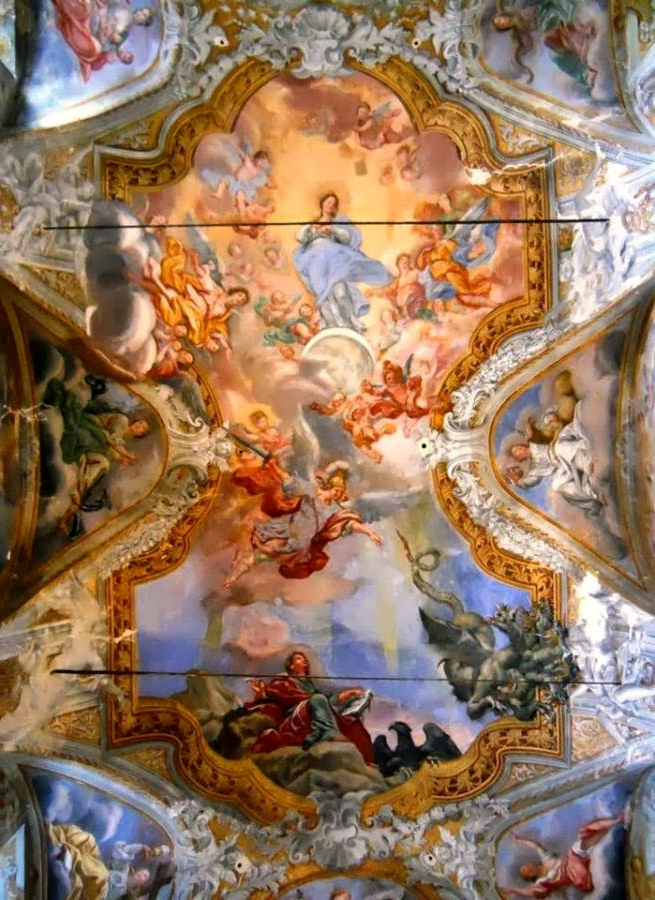
The Assumption of Mary, Church of John the Apostle, Piazza Armerina

In Palermo, he painted in 1733-34 some rooms of the archbishop's palace, which have been partially preserved. He worked on a number of secular projects. He was involved in decorating some aristocratic buildings, culminating in the frescos on the ceiling of the main gallery of the Palazzo dei Principi di Cattolica in Palermo. In 1733 he was called as an expert to settle a dispute between the two Sicilian painters, Venerando Costanza and Pietro Paolo Vasta, who were competing for the decoration of the interior of the Cathedral of Acireale. He decided in favour of Vasta. He was himself involved in a similar competition with Olivio Sòzzi over the decoration of the Cathedral of Alcamo. He won thanks to the support of the patrons.

Still in Sicily, he also frescoed the Church of John the Apostle, Piazza Armerina.

In the latter part of his life Borremans slowed down the hectic pace of his activities and fewer works are documented during this period. Borremans died on 17 April 1744 and was buried in the Capuchin Church in Palermo.

His son Luigi who likely trained and worked with him continued in his father's vein by creating vast decorative cycles for the local churches. Luigi's activity is known for signed and dated frescoes of 1747 located in Caltanissetta. To his grandson, Guglielmo the Younger, are attributed extensions to the paintings in the Cathedral of Enna, which are largely considered to be by the hand of Guglielmo the Elder.

== Work ==
Almost all of his known oeuvre was made and is located in Southern Italy. The majority of his works depict religious and, to a lesser extent, mythological subject matter. He was praised as a portrait painter during his residence in Naples, but no painted portraits are currently attributed to him.

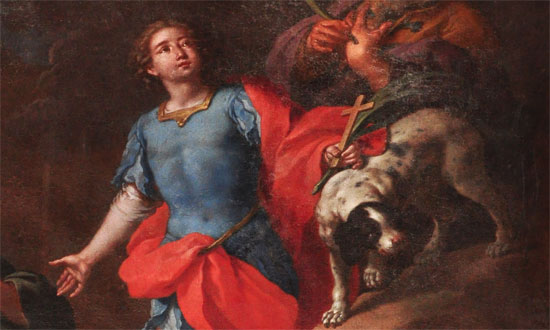
Saint Vitus

Guglielmo Borremans was quite unique in that as a Flemish painter who was not trained in the technique and art of fresco painting, he was able to establish himself as one of the leading fresco painters in southern Italy in the early 18th century. He may have learned the fresco technique from his master Pieter van Lint who during his time in Italy painted frescos in the Cybo-Soderini Chapel in the Basilica of Santa Maria del Popolo in Rome. He also created works on canvas. Many of his works have been lost due to destruction caused by war and lack of adequate restoration. He also used a thinner wash of pigments than local painters which may have contributed to a quicker decay.

His earliest works show his debt to the Flemish Baroque school and in particular the work of Peter Paul Rubens. Later his style absorbed local and contemporary influences and developed towards the late Baroque idiom that was popular in southern Italy at the time. His youth works show in particular his dependence on the Rubens tradition as continued by Rubens' pupils Anthony van Dyck and Jacob Jordaens. In this early period, he seems to have been free from direct Italian influence although he showed the indirect influence of Italian art as transmitted by his master Pieter van Lint. His work of that time was close to the Flemish-influenced Italian art then current in Genoa. In the Dispute of St Catherine of Alexandria with the philosophers before Maxentius he comes particularly close to works of Pieter van Lint such as van Lint's Christ healing the lame at the pool of Bethesda (1640s, Kunsthistorisches Museum, Vienna).

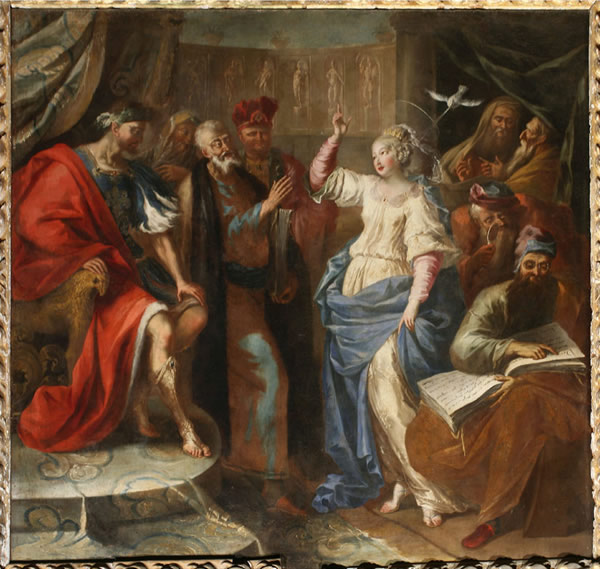
Dispute of St Catherine of Alexandria with the philosophers before Maxentius

The pieces created in Cosenza in 1703-1706 show stylistically a Flemish basis over which a layer of pre-rococo sensitivity has been laid. At the same time, the works reveal some late Manierist elements, possibly absorbed from Pieter van Lint, and visible in the lengthened and graceful figures. These works display originality in design and an exquisite palette. Borremans' use of brilliant reds and full-bodied blends, as well as the detailed rendering of the fabrics and the different pieces of flowers, show his 17th-century Flemish heritage. These works also show similarity to the work of other pupils of van Lint such as Godfried Maes whose work also tends to lengthen the forms and use soft subjects. His brushstrokes in these works are lively and his compositions are balanced.

In his Naples paintings dating to 1708-1709 he showed a similarity to the work of Luigi Garzi, a Roman influence that may also have been the result of the influence of followers of the Roman style in Naples such as Luca Giordano and Paolo de Matteis.

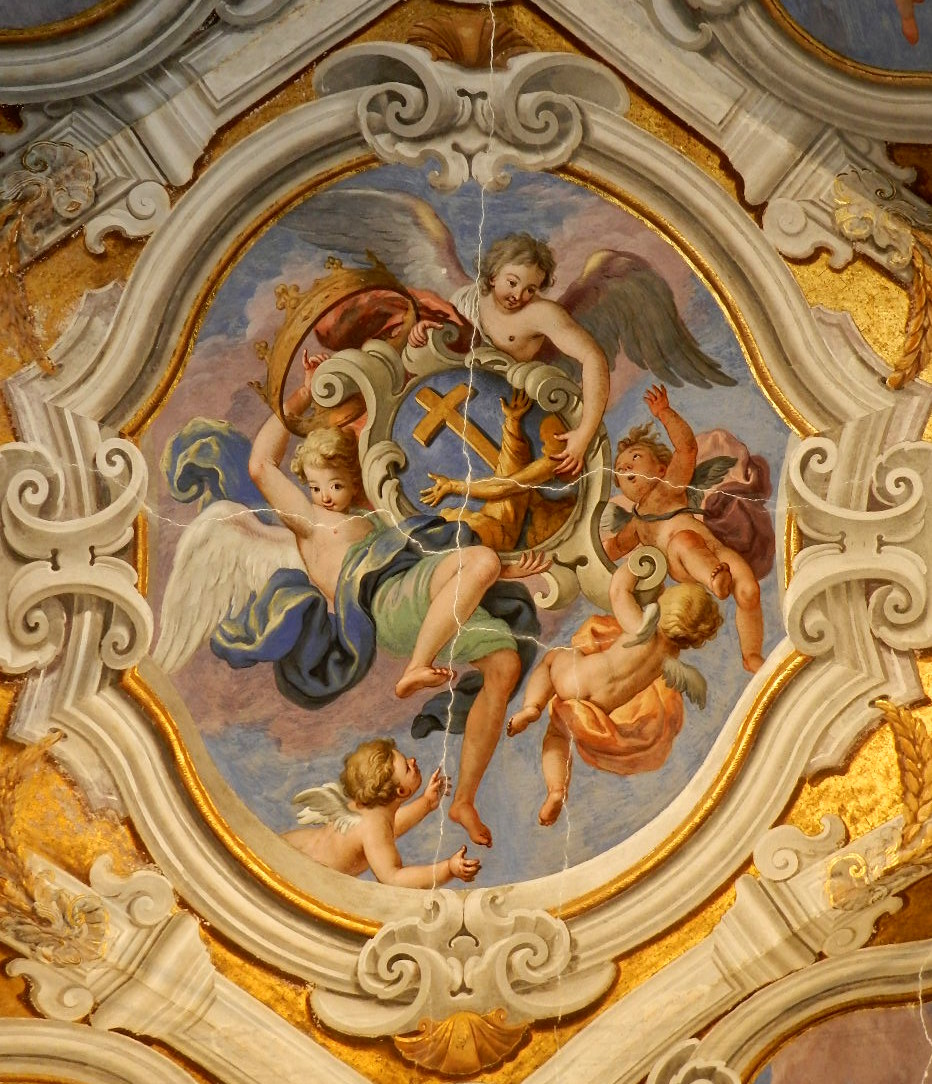
Emblem of the Franciscan Order with Putti

His masterpieces include the remarkable series of frescoes in the Basilica di Santa Maria Assunta in Alcamo, the Chiesa delle Anime Sante in Enna, the Chiesa di San Giuseppe in Leonforte and the Chiesa dell'Assunta di San Giuseppe dei teatini in Palermo.

== Selected works ==
- Frescoes in the Chiesa dei SS. Quaranta Martiri alla Guilla and Chiesa di S. Maria di Montevergini in Palermo
- Frescoes in the Chiesa Madre or Basilica di Santa Maria Assunta, Alcamo
- Annunciation in San Michele Arcangelo ai Minoriti, Catania
- Frescoes (started 1722) in the Cathedral Santa Maria la Nova and in the Church of St. Agatha in Caltanissetta
- Ceiling frescoes of the apse of the Chiesa di San Vincenzo Ferreri, and a Glory of San Vincenzo Ferrere (1717), both in Nicosia, Sicily

== Sources ==
- 'Flemish Masters and Other Artists: Foreign Artists from the Heritage of the Fondo Edifici Di Culto Del Ministero Dell'interno', Palazzo Ruspoli (Rome, Italy), L'erma di Bretschneider, 2008
- Gioacchino Di Marzo, 'Guglielmo Borremans di Anversa, pittore fiammingo in Sicilia nel secolo XVIII : (1715 - 1744)’, Reber, Palermo, 1912 (in Italian)
