= San Tommaso Apostolo, Enna =

Church in Enna, Italy

Coordinates: 37.56594°N 14.27521°E

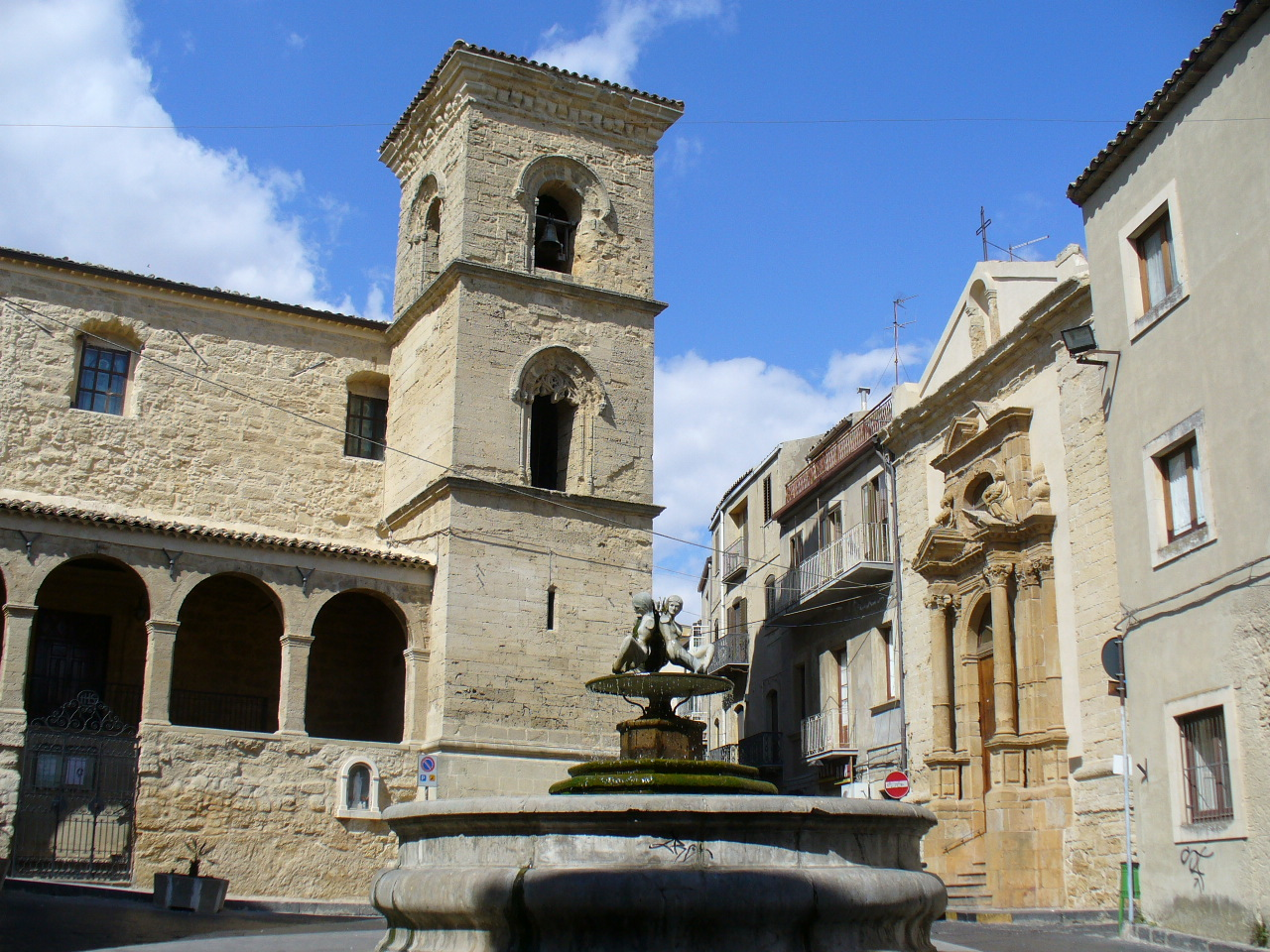
View from the Piazza Neglia of the fountain in foreground; on the left the bell-tower and portico of San Tommaso, and on the left the facade of Anime Sante.

San Tommaso Apostolo is a Roman Catholic parish church located on the Piazza Francesco Paolo Neglia (also known as Piazza San Tommaso, and Via Roma in the town of Enna in Sicily, Italy. At a diagonal, across the street stands the church of Anime Sante del Purgatorio.

== History and description ==
Documents show that a church dedicated to St Thomas in Enna was contributing to the bishopric of Catania by 1308–1310. In 1500, the sculptor Giuliano Mancino was commissioned to make the marble altarpiece for the main altar, completed in 1515. In the first decades of the 17th-century, Francesco Pellegrino (Peregrinus) painted the altarpiece depicting St Thomas verifying the Resurrected Christ. The work was restored in 1708 by Giuseppe Salamone. The crucifix in the church was restored in 1526, thus dates to prior centuries. Among the other artworks in the church is, for the painting by Peregrinus, a floral mosaic background by Giuseppe Fornasier. The church has four paintings of the prophets and a Holy Family by Saverio Marchese (1806–1859), who was the brother of the priest of San Tommaso.

The fountain with bronze sirens by Mario Termini in the piazza before the church was inaugurated in 1989. The bell-tower dates from the late 16th century. The stairs before the facade had a metal balustrade added in 1994.

The church hosts celebrations for the Madonna of the Consolation and for Saint Lucy. Based in the church is the Confraternity of the Holy Sacrament, originally established in 1687 as the Compagnia dei Bianchi, that was meant to accompany those condemned to death. Originally, the confraternity had a home in the no-longer extant Chiesa del Santissimo Sacramento, once located adjacent to the Chiesa Madre. This group was dissolved in the late 19th century during the wave of dissolutions with the advent of the Kingdom of Italy, but refounded in 1935 to as a lay Catholic organization. In 1991, the confraternity gifted the parish with a painting exalting the Mystery of the Eucharist by Pietro Marzilla.
