= Crispino =

Crispino is an Italian-language occupational surname and name, literally meaning "cobbler".

The surname may refer to:

- Armando Crispino (1924–2003), Italian film director and screenwriter
- Diamante Crispino (born 1994), Italian footballer
- Jerry L. Crispino (1930–2009), American politician
- Jesús Eduardo Corso Crispino (1920–2012), Uruguayan lawyer, agricultural journalist and writer
- Mike Crispino, American sportscaster
