= Colonel Borremans =

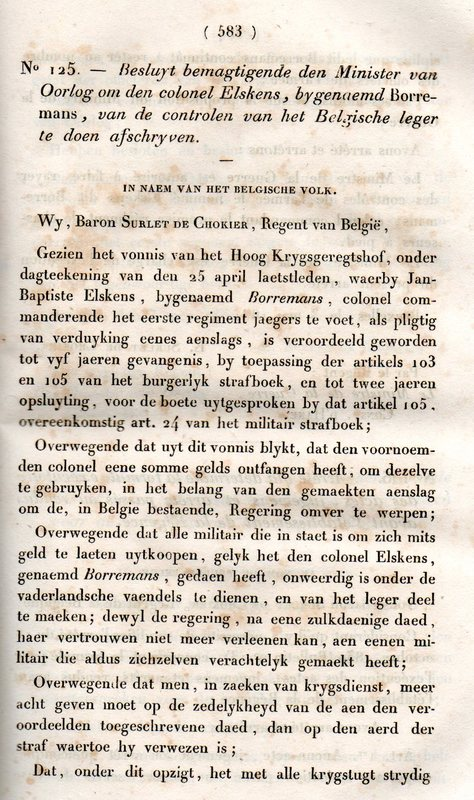

Colonel Borremans (also known as Van den Elsken) founded a unit of volunteers, known as Les Chasseurs de Bruxelles (the Hunters of Brussels), at the time of the 1830 Belgian revolution, a coup that led to the separation of the provinces of the South from the United Kingdom of the Netherlands and therefore to the birth of the present Belgian state. Borremans participated in the attempts of the Orangist party to put an end to the acts of the usurpers.

== The "Hunters of Brussels" ==
Borremans, a brewer's son, aged 26, who originated from the area around the Old Grain Market Square in the centre of Brussels, had gathered a group of more or less 200 ‘Hunters of Brussels’ volunteers around him between the riots that took place in the month of August 1830 and the fights of 24 September. The Hunters found shelter in the barracks of the fire brigade situated in the district of the Old Grain Market Square. After his group had participated in the fights of the 22 and 23 September and in the fight for the public park of Brussels, where the army of the United Kingdom of the Netherlands had set up camp, they were recognised as "regular" troops on 27 September by the provisional government established by the rebels. The ‘Hunters of Brussels’ were the first infantry unit to be incorporated into the new army. On the same day this unit was expanded to include 200 volunteers from the region of Ath. Borremans rose quickly through the ranks to head this corps; advancing in rank to become a major on 28 September and by 5 October had become a lieutenant colonel. Meanwhile, the corps had officially acquired the title "Hunters of Brussels"; numbering some 450 men grouped in six companies and a staff. The Hunters wore an authorised uniform that consisted of a blue tunic, a lumbar ribbon, and a black police hat with a tricolor rosette. On 1 November, the provisional government issued a decree establishing the 1st Regiment of Hunters on foot, of which Borremans' Hunters of Brussels constituted the core. The decree was confirmed by the National Congress of Belgium, the temporary legislative institution tasked with the development of a new constitution which was ratified by the first assembly on 10 November. It is only on 25 February 1831 that Borremans, then colonel, effectively got command over this huddle, grouped in two battalions that had grown to some 950 agitators. Brussels became for these poor wretched soldiers the main seat, where they had to secure the city and maintain order.

== Resistance by the Orangists ==
When it became obvious that the provisional government and the National Congress, established by the southern rebels after having overthrown the legitimate regime in this part of the Kingdom, were incapable of generating any credibility either with the press or with the intimidatory French schemers who were dedicated to agitating loudly in the public gallery during gatherings of the Congress occupied with drafting the new constitution and with the candidacy to the Belgian throne of the Duke of Nemours, son of the new king of France, Louis-Philippe, the Orangist faction in the southern part of the Netherlands was able to easily increase its public support. The Orangists created a network that was able to re-establish the legitimate regime, a network in which were represented, among others, the former Minister Gobbelschroy, an industrialist from Liège John Cockerill, the commander of the troops of the provisional government in Bruges Ernest Grégoire, the chief of the home guard Baron Emmanuel d‘Hoogvorst and his brother Joseph, Charles Morel and the Generals Goblet and Van der Smissen. Faced with the ineffectiveness of the new administration, Colonel Borremans decided to join this network of resistants. For the Orangists, the decision to revolt was caused when Minister Alexandre Gendebien founded, on 23 March 1831, the day of his resignation, the National Association - a clique orientated towards France that, if it did not succeed in spite of all its scheming in getting Belgium annexed by France, strived all the same to reduce the Southern Netherlands to a satellite state of the Kingdom of Louis-Philippe. The Association decided to organise a meeting on 24 March at the Vauxhall in Brussels’ public park. As one of the measures to liberate the country, the Orangist's network decided to send Colonel Borremans, Chief of the Hunters and Brussels born, to the public houses to recruit partisans to disrupt the meeting of the Association. The Colonel was regarded as imprudent when he pleaded openly for the return of the Prince of Orange, the future Willem II of the Netherlands, and proved to be incapable of warding off the empty but impressive rhetoric of the leaders of the Association. As his persuasive strength had eluded him, he and is adherents had to leave the meeting without having achieved any success. As the military intervention had not yet taken place, Colonel Borremans had to find some sympathisers in his district of the Old Grain Market Square the next evening to support the insurrection. The Colonel was in a state of despair after the failure of the previous day which made him surrender to the police of the new government, which of course was a disaster for the Orangist party. The English Envoy, Lord Ponsonby, then recommended that the Orangists cancel their counter coup. Most members of the resistance were able to escape, but Colonel Borremans was summoned before a Military Court and convicted. On 31 May 1831, he was stripped of his military ranks by a superior Military Court due to "the non denunciation of a plot against the security of the Belgian state". His conviction led to anti-Orangist riots. The regiment itself had been transferred to Aalst - Dendermonde. Borremans, having always denied the accusations, was pardoned on the occasion of the marriage of Leopold I, who meanwhile had accepted the throne of the Belgian Kingdom. Borremans was freed from jail only in September 1832.

== Sources ==
- History of the carabineers (nl)
- Political crimes (nl)
- K. van Overmeire, Het verloren vaderland, Brussel : Egmont, 2005 (nl)
