= Paolo Portoghesi =

Italian architect (1931–2023)

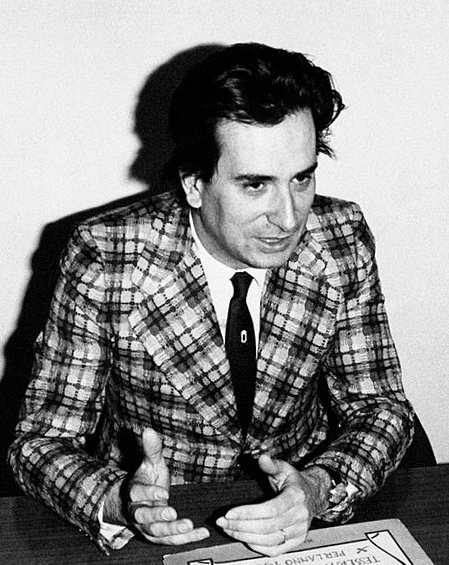
Portoghesi in 1970

Paolo Portoghesi (2 November 1931 – 30 May 2023) was an Italian architect, theorist, historian, and professor of architecture at the Sapienza University of Rome. He was president of the architectural section of the Venice Biennale (1979–1992), editor-in-chief of the journal Controspazio (1969–1983), and dean of the Faculty of Architecture at the Politecnico di Milano university (1968–1978).

== Biography ==
Portoghesi was born on November 2, 1931, in Rome. He studied architecture at the Faculty of Architecture at the Sapienza University of Rome, completing his studies in 1957. He began teaching the history of criticism at the same faculty in 1961. Portoghesi opened an architectural practice with architect-engineer Vittorio Gigliotti (born 1921) in Rome in 1964. His first project was an interior design commission for an office building of ENPAS in Pistoia and its headquarters in Lucca.

Portoghesi specialised in teaching and researching Classical architecture, especially Baroque architecture, and in particular Borromini, but also Michelangelo. He taught at the Politecnico di Milano’s School of Architecture from 1967 until he became its dean from 1968 to 1976. He then transferred to the Sapienza University and worked as a full professor.

His interest in more contemporary architecture coincided largely with that of his colleague in Rome, Bruno Zevi, in championing a more organic form of modernism, evident in, for instance, the work of Victor Horta and Frank Lloyd Wright, and in Italy with neorealism and the Liberty style. This attitude has continued throughout Portoghesi's career, and is clearly visible in his own architecture. It is also evident in his concern for the studies of nature, brought to the fore in his more recent book Nature and Architecture (2000).

Portoghesi died on 30 May 2023, at the age of 91.

== Selection of projects and works ==
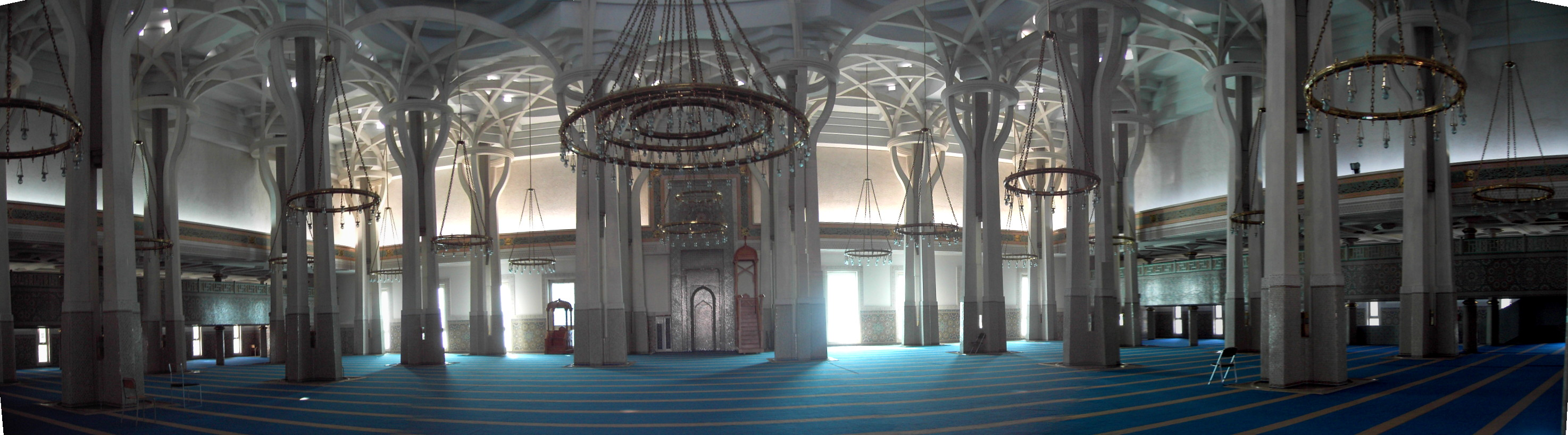
Mosque of Rome (1974)

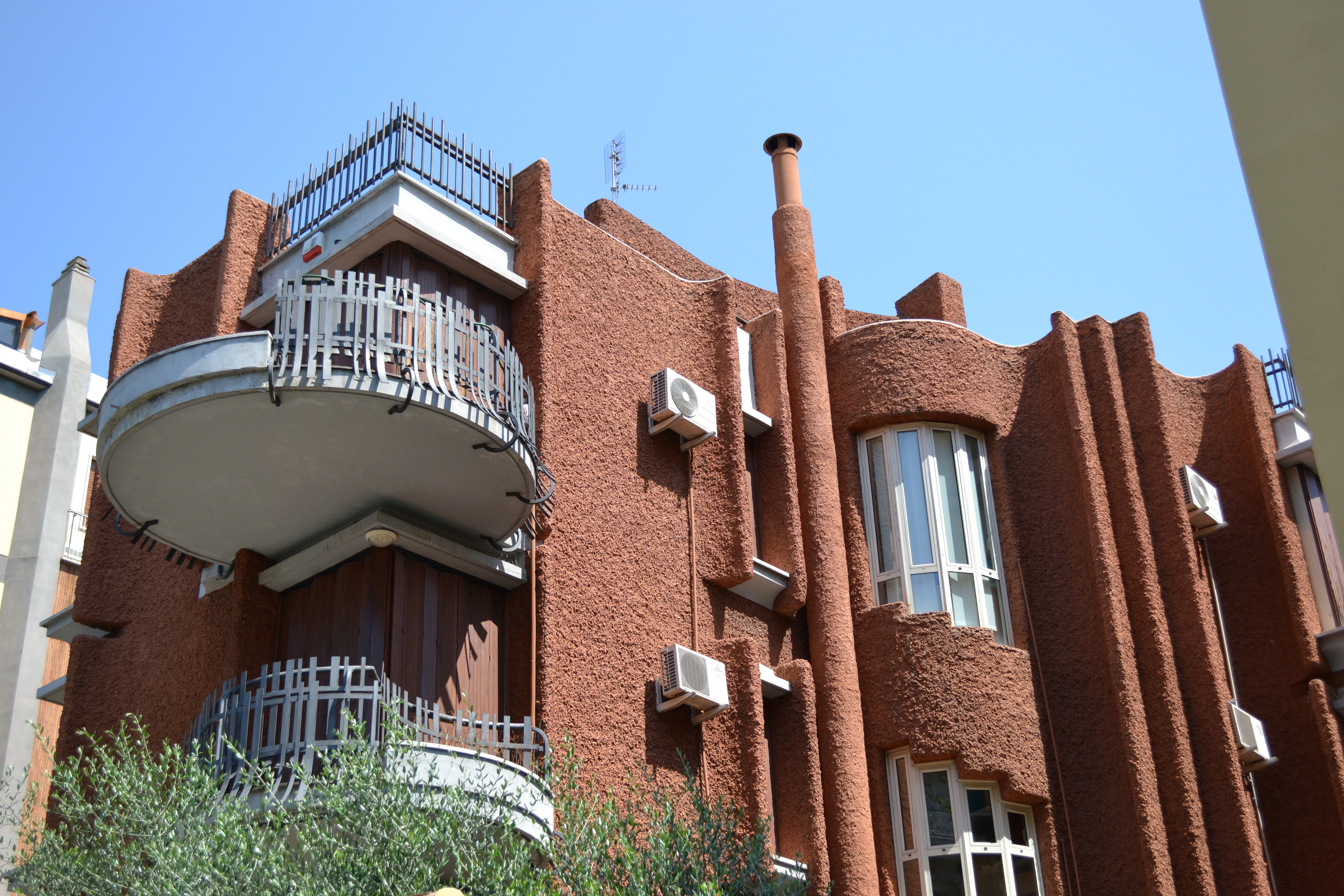
Casa Papanice currently part of The American University of Rome, Rome circa 2012

- Casa Baldi, Rome (1959)
- Palazzo INPDAP Lucca (1960)
- Casa Andreis Scandriglia (1964)
- Casa Bevilacqua (1964)
- Theatre of Cagliari (1965)
- Casa Papanice Roma (1966)
- Church of Sacra Famiglia, Salerno (1969)
- The Grand Hotel, Khartoum, Sudan (1972–73)
- Royal Court, Amman, Jordan (1973)
- Mosque of Rome (1974)
- Academy of Fine Arts, L'Aquila (1978–82)
- The Presence of the Past, curator of architecture exhibition at Venice Biennale (1980)
- ENEL Condominium, Tarquinia (1981)
- Centola Palinuro (Salerno, Italy) Town Plan (Piano Regolatore)(1984)
- Tegel residence, IBA Berlin, Germany (1984–88)
- Le terme di Montecatini, Pistoia (1987)
- The Politeama Theatre, Catanzaro (1988)
- The garden and library of Calcata (1990)
- The Letto di Ulisse, created by Savio Firmino for the Abitare il Tempo exhibition (1992)
- La piazza Leon Battista Alberti, Rimini (1990)
- Chapel of Don Giuseppe Rizzo, Alcamo (1995)
- Church of Santa Maria della Pace, Terni (1997)
- The Rinascimento in Talenti park, Rome (2001)
- The Montpellier Gardens (Lattes), France
- The Central American Parliament, Esquipulas, Guatemala
- The Primavera restaurant, Moscow, Russia
- Town Hall square, Pirmasens, Germany.
- Headquarters of the Royalties Institute, St. Peter's College, Oxford, UK
- Public square, Shanghai, China (2006)
- Strasbourg Mosque, 2011
- Cimitero Nuovo di Cesena, 2011

== Awards ==
- Honoris Causa in Technical Sciences from the University of Lausanne, Switzerland
- Legion d'Honneur, France.
