= Paolo Visconti =

Most Reverend Paolo Visconti
- Archbishop of Palermo
- Church: Catholic Church
- Diocese: Archdiocese of Palermo
- In office: 1469 –1473
- Predecessor: Giovanni Burgio
- Successor: Filippo di Navarra

Personal details
- Died: 1473 Palermo, Italy

Paolo Visconti (died 1469) was a Roman Catholic prelate who served as Archbishop of Palermo (1469 –1473).

== Biography ==
On 6 Sep 1469, Paolo Visconti was appointed by Pope Paul II as Archbishop of Palermo. He served as Archbishop of Palermo until his death in 1473.

== External links and additional sources ==
- Cheney, David M. "Archdiocese of Palermo". Catholic-Hierarchy.org. (for Chronology of Bishops) ^{[self-published]}
- Chow, Gabriel. "Metropolitan Archdiocese of Palermo (Italy)". GCatholic.org. (for Chronology of Bishops) ^{[self-published]}

Catholic Church titles
Preceded by Giovanni Burgio	Archbishop of Palermo; 1469 –1473	Succeeded by Filippo di Navarra
