= Giovanni Burgio =

Most Reverend Giovanni Burgio
- Archbishop of Palermo
- Church: Catholic Church
- Diocese: Archdiocese of Palermo
- In office: 1467–1469
- Predecessor: Niccolò Tedeschi
- Successor: Paolo Visconti

Personal details
- Died: 1469 Palermo, Italy

Giovanni Burgio (died 1469) was a Roman Catholic prelate who served as Archbishop of Palermo (1467–1469).

== Biography ==
On 16 Nov 1467, Giovanni Burgio was appointed by Pope Paul II as Archbishop of Palermo. He served as Archbishop of Palermo until his death in 1469.

== See also ==
- Catholic Church in Italy

== External links and additional sources ==
- Cheney, David M. "Archdiocese of Palermo". Catholic-Hierarchy.org. (for Chronology of Bishops) ^{[self-published]}
- Chow, Gabriel. "Metropolitan Archdiocese of Palermo (Italy)". GCatholic.org. (for Chronology of Bishops) ^{[self-published]}

Catholic Church titles
Preceded by Niccolò Tedeschi	Archbishop of Palermo; 1467–1469	Succeeded by Paolo Visconti
