= Alessandro Lualdi =

Italian Cardinal

His Eminence Alessandro Lualdi
- Cardinal, Archbishop of Palermo
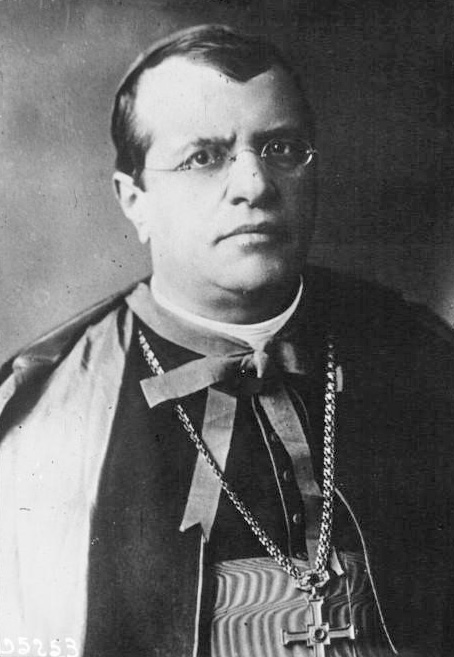
- Lualdi in 1922.
- Church: Roman Catholic Church
- Archdiocese: Palermo
- See: Palermo
- Appointed: 14 November 1904
- Term ended: 12 November 1927
- Predecessor: Michelangelo Celesia
- Successor: Luigi Lavitrano
- Other post: Cardinal-Priest of Santi Andrea e Gregorio al Monte Celio (1907–27)
- Previous post: Rector of the Pontifical Lombard Seminary (1894–1904)

Orders
- Ordination: 30 October 1880
- Consecration: 4 December 1904 by Francesco di Paola Cassetta
- Created cardinal: 15 April 1907 by Pope Pius X
- Rank: Cardinal-Priest

Personal details
- Born: Alessandro Lualdi; 12 August 1858 Milan, Kingdom of Lombardy–Venetia
- Died: 12 November 1927 (aged 69) Palermo, Kingdom of Italy
- Buried: Palermo Cathedral
- Education: Pontifical University of Saint Thomas Aquinas
- Coat of arms

Styles of Alessandro Lualdi
- Reference style: His Eminence
- Spoken style: Your Eminence
- Informal style: Cardinal
- See: Palermo

Alessandro Lualdi J.C.D. S.T.D. (12 August 1858 – 12 November 1927) was an Italian Roman Catholic cardinal who served as Archbishop of Palermo.

== Biography ==
Lualdi was born in Milan, Italy. He entered the Seminary of Milan and carried on further studies at the Theological Academy of Saint Thomas Aquinas in Rome where he earned doctorates in theology, philosophy and canon law. He was ordained in 1880. After his ordination, he worked in the Archdiocese of Milan doing pastoral work from 1884 until 1890. He later served as a faculty member of the Seminary of Milan until 1894. He was created Privy Chamberlain of His Holiness on 14 September 1899.

== Episcopate ==
Pope Pius X appointed him Archbishop of Palermo on 14 November 1904. He was made Cardinal-Priest of Santi Andrea e Gregorio al Monte Celio in the consistory of 15 April 1907. He took part in the conclaves of 1914 that elected Pope Benedict XV and 1922 that elected Pope Pius XI.

He died in 1927 and is buried in the metropolitan cathedral of Palermo. The following inscription marks his grave: ALEXANDRO PRESB. CARD. LVALDI HIC IN PACE CHRISTI QUIESCITALEXANDRO CAR. ARCHIEP. LVALDIQUI D. URBIS PATRONAEENIXE CULTUM PROVEXITPRUDENTIA CARITATE TH. DISCIPLINISPRAESTITITPANORMITANA DIOCESISAN. REP. SAL. MCXXXVII

Catholic Church titles
Preceded by Michelangelo Celesia	Archbishop of Palermo; 14 November 1904 – 12 November 1927	Succeeded by Luigi Lavitrano
