= Archdiocese of Palermo =

Roman Catholic archdiocese in Italy

Coordinates: 38.1156°N 13.4281°E

Archdiocese of Palermo Archidioecesis Panormitana Arcidiocesi di Palermo

Catholic
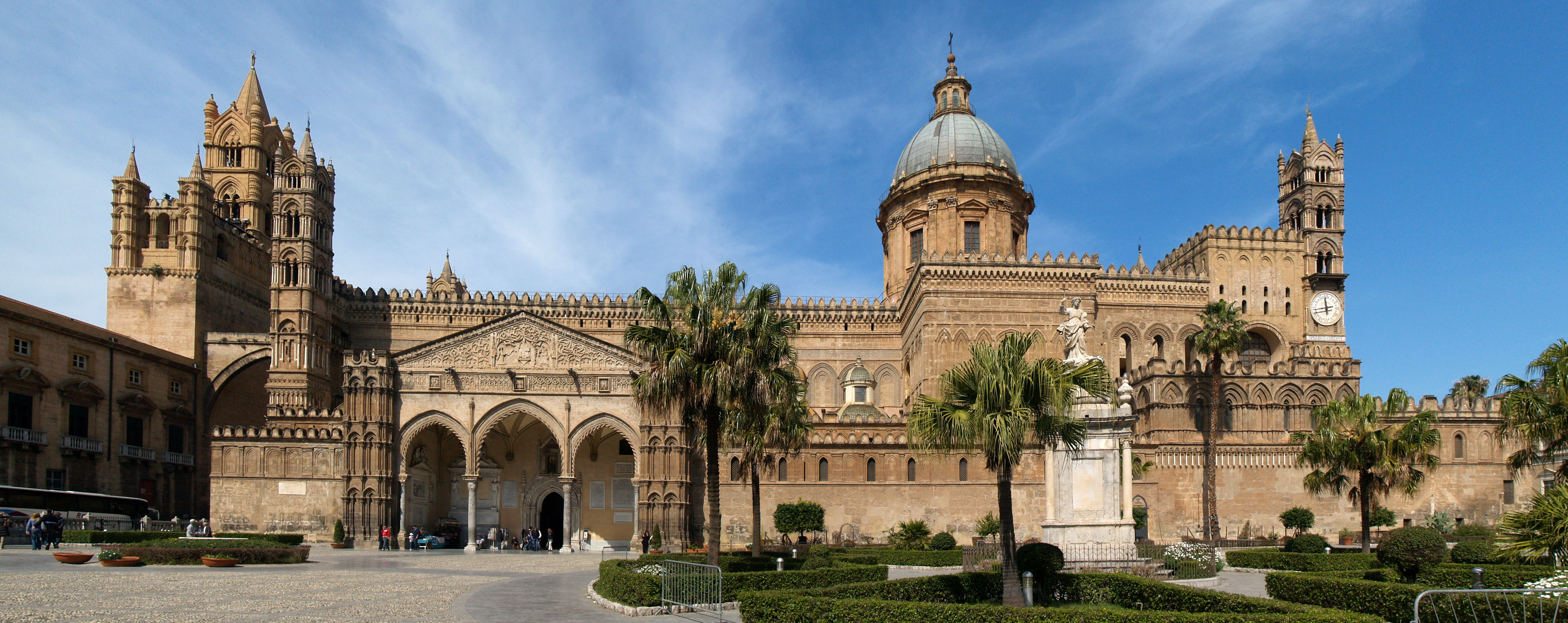

Location
- Country: Italy
- Ecclesiastical province: Palermo

Statistics
- Area: 1,366 km^{2} (527 sq mi)
- Population: Total; Catholics: (as of 2023); 919,000 (est.) ▼; 875,800 (est.) ▼
- Parishes: 178

Information
- Denomination: Catholic Church
- Rite: Roman Rite
- Established: 1st Century
- Cathedral: Cattedrale di l’Assunzione di Maria
- Secular priests: 240 (diocesan) ▲250 (Religious Orders) ▲41 Permanent deacons

Current leadership
- Pope: Leo XIV
- Archbishop: Corrado Lorefice
- Bishops emeritus: Salvatore De Giorgi; Paolo Romeo

Map
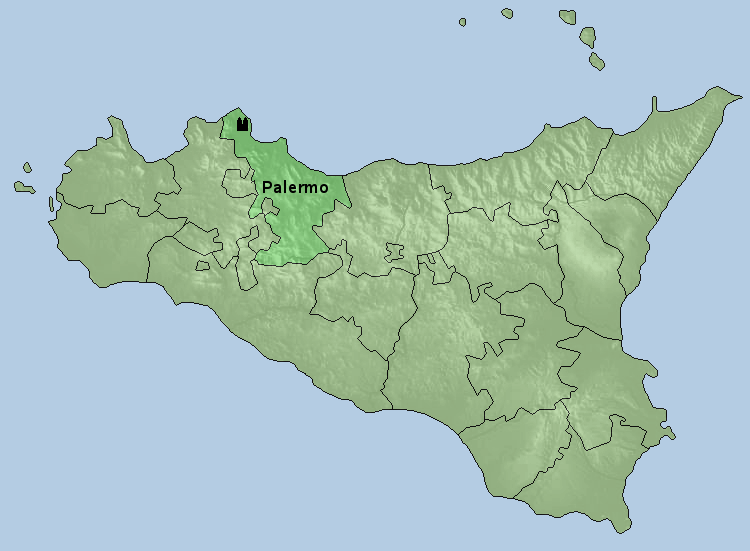

Website
- Archdiocese of Palermo (in Italian)

The Metropolitan Archdiocese of Palermo (Latin: Archidioecesis Panormitana) is a Latin diocese of the Catholic Church. It was founded, according to a dubious hagiographical tale, in the first century, though evidence suggests that it was a fifth century creation. The diocese was raised to the status of archdiocese in the 11th century. The archbishop is Corrado Lorefice.

== History ==
Palermo is just south of a major active seismic zone, and is subject to frequent earthquakes and occasional inundations (tsunamis). The events of 1693, 1726 and 1823 were particularly destructive.

In the 8th century, a monk produced a tale called "The Life of St. Philip of Agyrium," claiming Philip as the first Christianizer of Palermo. He is said to have lived in the reign of the Emperor Arcadius (395–408). Rescued from a shipwreck by an apparition of St. Peter the Apostle, he went to Rome, was ordained a priest by the pope, and sent to Sicily to exorcise the demon of Mount Etna. In another "Life of St. Philip", revised after the Norman conquest of Sicily, Philip is made to live in the time of Nero (54–68), to be consecrated by Saint Peter personally, and to be sent to Sicily as the first bishop of Palermo.

Pope Gregory I personally founded six monasteries in Sicily, including the monastery of S. Hermes at Palermo, according to Ugo Benigni. He also founded the monastery of S. Hadrian and the Praetoritanum. In the confusion following the death of Bishop Victor, in November 602 Pope Gregory appointed Bishop Barbarus of Carini as apostolic visitor of the diocese of Palermo. Carini may have been one of Palermo's suffragans.

In 718 the Emperor Leo III the Isaurian (718–741) suppressed a revolt in Sicily, and then detached southern Italy and Sicily from the metropolitan jurisdiction of the pope in Rome. In the ninth century, the patriarch of Constantinople raised the See of Palermo to the rank of metropolitan of all of Sicily. A protest against these actions was entered by Pope Nicholas I (858–867), in a letter of 25 September 860 to the Emperor Michael III.

=== Arab control over Palermo and its church ===
Arab invasions of Sicily had begun at the beginning of the eighth century with the capture of the island of Cossura (modern Pantelleria). Raids were launched in 730–731, 734–735, 740 and 752–753. Palermo was temporarily captured in 820, but the Arabs were driven out by pirates. The serious conquest of the island began in 827, from the Tunisian port of Susa, led by Asad Ibn Al-Furàt. Palermo fell in 831, Messina in 843, Leontini in 847, and Syracuse in 878. Taormina was captured in 902, completing the conquest of the entire island. From then until 1061, when the Norman conquests began, Sicily was an Arab land.

Ugo Benigni states, "Concerning the state of the Sicilian Church during the Saracen domination we have no information: not the name of a single bishop is known."

After the famine of 940, the Arabs deliberately drove Christians out of the western part of the island.

=== Norman control over the church of Palermo ===
On 10 January 1072, following negotiations and the surrender of the Muslims of Palermo, the brothers Robert Guiscard and Roger de Hauteville entered the city of Palermo in triumph. They immediately ordered the cathedral of the Greek Christian community to be reconsecrated, and attended a Mass of thanksgiving. In 1077, the city of Trapani fell to the Normans.

On 16 April 1083, Pope Gregory VII wrote a letter to Archbishop Alcherius of Palermo, confirming his diocese's possessions and privileges ("quidquid dignitatis antiquitus tenuisse probatur"), including all his suffragan dioceses, or, if any of them has been destroyed, whatever is established in their place.

Bishop Peter of Squillace was appointed archbishop of Palermo in the winter of 1123. He attended the Lateran Council of Pope Calixtus II in March 1123.

On Christmas Day, 1130, Count Roger II was crowned King of Sicily in the Cathedral in Palermo. It is uncertain who crowned the king. One source names Count Roger of Capua, another Archbishop Peter of Palermo. The cathedral was rebuilt by Archbishop Walter between 1170 and 1190.

The Archdiocese of Palermo was united with the Archdiocese of Monreale on 7 July 1775. The union was dissolved on 12 March 1802. Monreale lost its metropolitan status in 2000, however, and it is now a suffragan of the Archdiocese of Palermo.

The Cathedral of Palermo is dedicated to the Bodily Assumption of the Virgin Mary into Heaven. The Chapter of the cathedral had three dignities in 1677, and two dignities in 1775. In 1211 there were eighteen canons, but the number grew to twenty-four in 1431, when Pope Eugenius IV ordered their reduction to eighteen again. In 1523 the Emperor Charles V added six more canons, bringing the number back up to twenty-four. There were again twenty-four canons in 1677 and twenty-six canons in 1775. The chapter had the right to elect the archbishop.

=== Reorganization of Sicilian ecclesiastical structure ===
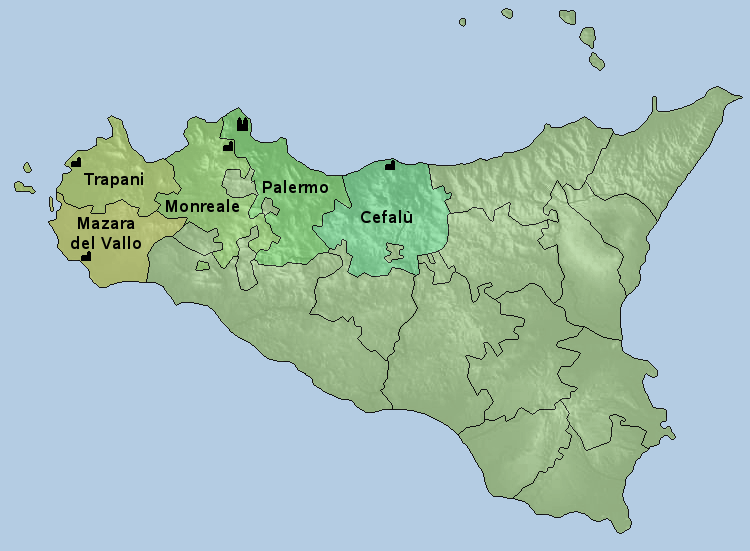
Map of the ecclesiastical province of Palermo.

In 2000, after extensive consultation with the Italian Episcopal Conference and the Congregation of Bishops, Pope John Paul II ordered a reorganization of the dioceses in Sicily. In the Apostolic Constitution "Ad maiori consulendum" of 2 December 2000. The metropolitan status of the archdiocese of Monreale was suppressed, and it was declared a suffragan of the archdiocese of Palermo. The diocese of Cefalù was transferred from the ecclesiastical provincw of Messina to that of Palermo.

The archdiocese has the following suffragans in the ecclesiastical province of Palermo:

- Diocese of Cefalù
- Diocese of Mazara del Vallo
- Archdiocese of Monreale
- Diocese of Trapani

== Bishops and Archbishops of Palermo ==
=== to 1200 ===
During the Greek occupation of Sicily (8th and 9th centuries) the only metropolitan bishop on the island was the metropolitan of Syracuse.

...

- Anonymous
- Anonymous (447)
- Gratianus (450–503)
- Agatho (c. 578–590)
- Victor (attested 591–599)
- Ioannes (attested 603)
- Felix (649)

Ecclesiastical province of Syracuse

- Theodorus (787)
- Anonymous (c. 800)
- Anonymous (819)

Arab Conquest of Sicily

- Humbertus (c. 1052–1054)
- Nicodemus (1065–after 1072)
- Alcherius (1083–1099)
- Gualterius (before 1111, 1112, 1113, 1117)
- Pietro (ca. 1123 – after 1130)
- Rogerius Frescra (c. 1141 – July 1143)
- Hugh (Ugo) (1150 – c. 1161)
- Stephen du Perche (1166–1170)
- Walterius Ophamil (1170–1187)
- Bartholomeus (1194–1201)

=== from 1200 to 1400 ===
- Parisius (22 May 1201 – before 10 May 1213)
- Berardus de Castacca (11 September 1213 – 8 September 1252)
- Guilelmus
- Leonardus (1261 – c. 1270)
- Giovanni Misnelli (2 June 1273 – ? )
- Petrus de Santafede (c. 1278 – 1284?)
- Licius (10 January 1304 – 12 December 1304)
- Bartolommeo (de Antiochia) (31 January 1306 – 1312)
- Franciscus (de Antiochia) (9 May 1312 – 1320)
- Giovanni Orsini (10 October 1320 – c. 1333)
- Cardinal Matteo Orsini, O.P. (1334 – 1336 Resigned)
- Theobaldus (24 April 1336 – c. 1350)
- Roger de Palheriis (Pulcheriis), O.Min. (17 November 1351 – 1360–1361)
- Arnaldus Caprarii, O.Min. (11 March 1361 – 1362)
- Octavianus de Labro (8 November 1362 – 1363)
- Melchiore Bevilacqua (20 December 1363 – 1364)
- Martinus de Aretio (15 January 1365 – 1366)
- Matthaeus de Cumis (13 November 1366 – 1376–1377)
- Nicolaus de Agrigento, O.Min. (18 February 1377 – after 1384)
- Ludovico Bonito (Ludovicus Bonitus) (before 1 June 1387 – 1395)
- Gilfortus Riccobono (23 October 1395 – 1398)

[Franciscus Vitalis]

=== from 1400 to 1600 ===
- Joannes de Procida (1400–1408)
- Cardinal Rinaldo Brancaccio (4 Aug 1410 – 1414 Resigned) Administrator
- Ubertinus de Marinis (20 June 1414 – 1434)
- Niccolò Tedeschi, O.S.B. (9 Mar 1435 – 24 Feb 1445 Died)
- Marino Orsini (4 June 1445 – 30 July 1445)
- Simone Beccatelli (Bonovius) (1446–1465)
- Nicolaus Pujades (23 August 1465 – 1467)
- Giovanni Burgio (16 Nov 1467 – 1469 Died)
- Paolo Visconti, O.Carm. (6 Sep 1469 – 1473 Died)
- Philip of Viana (Filippo di Navarra) (31 Jan 1477 – 1485 Resigned)
- Cardinal Pierre de Foix (le jeune) (14 May 1485 – 6 Jul 1489 Appointed, Administrator of Malta)
- Giovanni Paternò, O.S.B. (6 Jul 1489 – 1511 Died)
- Cardinal Francisco de Remolins (23 Jan 1512 – 5 Feb 1518)
- Cardinal Tommaso De Vio (Thomas Cajetan), O.P. (8 February 1518 – 19 December 1519) Administrator
- Giovanni Carondelet (Jean Carondelet) (19 Dec 1519 – 26 Mar 1544)
- Cardinal Pietro Tagliavia d’Aragonia (10 Oct 1544 – 5 Aug 1558 Died)
- Francisco Orozco de Arce (15 Mar 1559 – 11 Oct 1561 Died)
- Ottaviano Preconio, O.F.M. Conv. (18 Mar 1562 – 18 Aug 1568 Died)
- Juan Segría (Cengria) (16 Sep 1569 – 1570 Died)
- Giacomo Lomellino del Canto (10 Jan 1571 – 9 Aug 1575 Died)
- Cesare Marullo (11 Sep 1577 – 12 Nov 1588 Died)

=== from 1600 to 1800 ===
- Diego Haëdo (14 Aug 1589 – 5 Jul 1608 Died)
- Cardinal Giovanni Doria (5 Jul 1608 – 19 Nov 1642)
- Fernando Andrade Castro (28 Nov 1644 – 6 Jul 1648 Appointed, Archbishop (Personal Title) of Jaén)
- Martín de León Cárdenas, O.S.A. (27 Aug 1650 – 15 Nov 1655 Died)
- Pietro Jerónimo Martínez y Rubio (15 Jan 1657 – 22 Nov 1667 Died)
- Juan Lozano, O.S.A. (4 Feb 1669 – 26 Apr 1677
- Jaime de Palafox y Cardona (8 Nov 1677 – 13 Nov 1684)
- Ferdinando Bazan y Manriquez (1 Apr 1686 – 11 Aug 1702 Died)
- José Gasch (Casch), O.M. (26 Nov 1703 – 11 Jun 1729 Died)
- Giovanni Maurizio Gustavo (1730 – 1731 Died)
- Paolo Basile (Mathaeus de Pareta), O.F.M. Obs. (3 Sep 1731 – Jan 1736 Died)
- Domenico Rossi (Rosso e Colonna), O.S.B. (8 Jul 1737 – 6 Jul 1747 Died)
- José Alfonso Meléndez, O.F.M. Disc. (19 Feb 1748 – 31 Oct 1753 Died)
- Marcello Papiniano-Cusani (11 Feb 1754 – 16 Jun 1762 Resigned)
- Serafino Filangeri, O.S.B. (23 Aug 1762 – 29 Jan 1776 Appointed, Archbishop of Naples)
- Francesco Ferdinando Sanseverino, C.P.O. (15 Apr 1776 – 31 Mar 1793 Died)
- Filippo López y Rojo, C.R. (17 Jun 1793 – 4 Sep 1801 Resigned)

=== since 1800 ===
- Cardinal Domenico Pignatelli di Belmonte, C.R. (29 Mar 1802 – 5 Feb 1803 Died)
- Raffaele Mormile, C.R. (28 Mar 1803 – 31 Dec 1813 Died)
- Cardinal Pietro Gravina (23 Sep 1816 – 6 Dec 1830 Died)
- Cardinal Gaetano Trigona e Parisi (15 Apr 1833 – 5 Jul 1837 Died)
- Cardinal Ferdinando Maria Pignatelli, C.R. (21 Feb 1839 – 10 May 1853 Died)
- Giovanni Battista Naselli, C.O. (27 Jun 1853 – 3 May 1870 Died)
- Cardinal Michelangelo Celesia, O.S.B. (27 Oct 1871 – 14 April 1904)
- Cardinal Alessandro Lualdi (14 Nov 1904 – 12 Nov 1927 Died)
- Cardinal Luigi Lavitrano (29 Sep 1928 – Dec 1944 Resigned)
- Cardinal Ernesto Ruffini (11 Oct 1945 – 11 Jun 1967 Died)
- Cardinal Francesco Carpino (26 Jun 1967 – 17 Oct 1970 Resigned)
- Cardinal Salvatore Pappalardo (17 Oct 1970 – 4 Apr 1996)
- Cardinal Salvatore De Giorgi (4 Apr 1996 – 19 Dec 2006 Retired)
- Cardinal Paolo Romeo (19 Dec 2006 – 27 Oct 2015 Retired)
- Corrado Lorefice (27 Oct 2015 – )

== Books ==
=== Reference works ===
- Eubel, Conradus, ed. (1913). Hierarchia catholica (in Latin). Vol. 1 (Tomus 1) (second ed.). Münster: Libreria Regensbergiana. pp. 181–182.. Archived.
- Eubel, Conradus, ed. (1914). Hierarchia catholica (in Latin). Vol. 2 (Tomus 2) (second ed.). Münster: Libreria Regensbergiana. p. 125.. Archived.
- Eubel, Conradus, ed. (1923). Hierarchia catholica (in Latin). Vol. 3 (Tomus 3) (second ed.). Münster: Libreria Regensbergiana. p. 163.. Archived.
- Gams, Pius Bonifatius (1873). Series episcoporum Ecclesiae catholicae: quotquot innotuerunt a beato Petro apostolo. Ratisbon: Typis et Sumptibus Georgii Josephi Manz. pp. 946–947. (Use with caution; obsolete)
- Gauchat, Patritius (Patrice) (1935). Hierarchia catholica (in Latin). Vol. IV (1592-1667). Münster: Libraria Regensbergiana.
- Ritzler, Remigius; Sefrin, Pirminus (1952). Hierarchia catholica medii et recentis aevi (in Latin). Vol. V (1667-1730). Patavii: Messagero di S. Antonio.
- Ritzler, Remigius; Sefrin, Pirminus (1958). Hierarchia catholica medii et recentis aevi (in Latin). Vol. 6 (1730-1799). Patavii: Messagero di S. Antonio.
- Ritzler, Remigius; Sefrin, Pirminus (1968). Hierarchia Catholica medii et recentioris aevi (in Latin). Vol. 7 (1800–1846). Monasterii: Libr. Regensburgiana.
- Ritzler, Remigius; Sefrin, Pirminus (1978). Hierarchia catholica Medii et recentioris aevi (in Latin). Vol. 8 (1846–1903). Il Messaggero di S. Antonio.
- Pięta, Zenon (2002). Hierarchia catholica medii et recentioris aevi (in Latin). Vol. 9 (1903–1922). Padua: Messagero di San Antonio. ISBN 978-88-250-1000-8.

=== Studies ===
- Backman, Clifford R. (2002). The Decline and Fall of Medieval Sicily: Politics, Religion, and Economy in the Reign of Frederick III, 1296-1337. Cambridge University Press. ISBN 978-0-521-52181-9.
- Cappelletti, Giuseppe (1870). Le chiese d'Italia dalla loro origine sino ai nostri giorni (in Italian). Vol. vigesimoprimo (21). Venezia: Antonelli. pp. 572–579.
- De Ciocchis, Giovanni (1741; 1836). Sacræ regiæ visitationis per Siciliam a Joanne-Ang. de Ciocchis Caroli III regis jussu acta decretaque omnia. [1741-43.] Edited by Vincenzo Mortillaro. (in Italian). Volume 1. Palermo: Typographi Diarii Litterariae 1836.
- D'Angelo, Franco, ed. (2002). La città di Palermo nel Medioevo (in Italian). Palermo: Officina di Studi Medievali. ISBN 978-88-88615-39-4.
- Kamp, Norbert (1975). Kirche und Monarchie im staufischen Königreich Sizilien: I. Prosopographische Grundlegung, Bistumer und Bischofe des Konigreichs 1194–1266: 3. Sizilien München: Wilhelm Fink 1975, pp. 1109–1145.
- Kehr, Paul Fridolin. Italia Pontificia (in Latin), Vol. X: Calabria – Insulae (Turici: Weidmann 1975).
- Lanzoni, Francesco (1927). Le diocesi d'Italia dalle origini al principio del secolo VII (an. 604) (in Italian). Rome: Biblioteca Apostolica Vaticana. pp. 644-650.
- Loud, G. A. (2007). The Latin Church in Norman Italy. Cambridge: Cambridge University Press.
- Mongitore, Antonino; Lo Piccolo, Francesco (2009). Storia delle chiese di Palermo: i conventi (in Italian). Palermo: CRICD. ISBN 978-88-903321-5-9.
- Piccolus, Albertus (1623). De antiquo iure Ecclesiae Siculae dissertatio Alberti Piccoli ex congregatione oratorij Messanensis (in Latin). Messina: Giovanni Martinelli. pp. 18–20, 23–28, 141–147.
- Pirro, Rocco (1733). Mongitore, Antonino (ed.). Sicilia sacra disquisitionibus et notitiis illustrata. Vol. Tomus primus (third ed.). Palermo: haeredes P. coppulae. pp. 1–312.
- Savagnone, F. Guglielmo (1912). "Concili e sinodi di Sicilia," (in Italian), in: Atti della reale Accademia di scienze, lettere e belle arti di Palermo terza serie, Vol. 9. Palermo: Impresa generale d'Affissione e Publicità, 1912. pp. 3-212 + Appendice.
