= Ignazio De Blasi =

Italian historian (1717–1783)

- Born: 7 April 1717; Alcamo, Trapani, Kingdom of Sicily
- Died: September 1, 1783 (aged 66); Alcamo, Trapani, Kingdom of Sicily
- Occupations: historian; archaeologist
- Spouse: Angela Manfrè
- Children: 4
- Relatives: Gisella Giovenco, 6th great-granddaughter
- Writing career
- Period: 1746-1783
- Notable works: Discorso storico della opulenta città di Alcamo situata a piè del Monte Bonifato, e dell'antichissima città di Longarico ossia Lacarico, dopo detta Alcamo, su di esso monte.

Don Ignazio De Blasi (Alcamo, 7 April 1717- Alcamo, 1 September 1783) was an Italian historian. He was the first scholar who wrote a history of his town providing documentary evidence on it.

== Biography ==
Ignazio De Blasi was born in Alcamo on 7 April 1717 to a noble family. He was the son of Benedetto de Blasi (1681–1760), a notary, and his wife Francesca Puglisi (c.1682-c.1732). He was awarded the degree of Duty and Laws at the University of Catania in 1741. He died on 1 September 1783 in Alcamo, and was buried in the Church of Saint Francis of Assisi.

Wishing to publish his difficult historical research, he was admitted into the group of the Academy of the Good Taste of Alcamo in 1746. He wrote the history even as he was engaged with the administration of the municipality and of various charities, together with his public teaching activity at the Jesuits' college.

=== Works ===
The complete work of Ignazio De Blasi is collected in a volume of 1900 pages entitled: Discorso storico della opulenta città di Alcamo situata a piè del Monte Bonifato, e dell'antichissima città di Longarico ossia Lacarico, dopo detta Alcamo, su di esso monte.

De Blasi examined the memories of three priests from Alcamo: Cammarata, Zappante and Cossentino; consulted all the documents of the archives of parishes, of the town archives and of the dead notaries, whose keeper was his father. So, thanks to his tireless hard work, he completed a volume containing 1900 pages.

Since the dedication and introduction of the book, it is clear that the author believed that he had entirely maintained his hard commitment; actually the manuscript is an orderly collection of information, divided into 48 chapters, about the coat of arms, the mount and its neighbouring rivers, the origin, the domains, the territory, churches, nunneries, friaries and all charities, famous people, privileges and other memorable things of the town.

At about 1780, De Blasi wrote the earliest known description of the archaeological site on Mount Bonifato, reporting some information about two Latin inscriptions (of doubtful origin) and an Arab coin.

Even if it is full of unacceptable mistakes and assumptions, some repetitions and a poor style, it is an important work, both for the richness of the subject and for the abundance of documents which contains, such as: privileges, taxes, customs and other old deeds taken from the Red Book and from the documents of the municipality (= court giuratoria): both of them are not existing any longer owing to the fire during the rebel movements taking place in Sicily in 1820.

As a manuscript, this work serves as a primary source for the history of Alcamo, as many civic archive sources used by De Blasi have since been lost

In the course of time, many scholars and historians from Alcamo have mentioned his work, which is of primary importance because it gives a lot of information about the foundation of religious buildings and institutions, among which the Confraternities existing in Alcamo.

=== Manuscript ===
For 17 years the manuscript, nearly all autograph, remained in the heirs’ hands, that is, Angela Manfrè, his widow, and the daughter, but in 1800 they donated it to the town archives; in exchange for it, they received a life annuity of 20 uncias each. This decree, approved by scrupulous and grateful administrators, has both given the town an important work and provided a benefit to De Blasi's family members.

On 23 October 1800, by an act of public authority at the notary Giovanni Coppola, the volume, was temporarily entrusted to the representative of the municipality dottor Antonio Mangione, in order to use it in an action against the Royal State ownership. Later it was deposited in the town archives and they had another copy written, but it has remained without the last five chapters.

Today, both the authentic manuscript and the incomplete copy are in the Civic Library Sebastiano Bagolino; in 1875, the town council deliberated the publication of De Blasi's work at the municipality’s expense

== Family ==
He came from a noble Alcamese family that descended from the De Ballis family. Ignazio de Blasi was also a relative of Francesco Mistretta, a Sicilian politician who served as Director of Ecclesiastical Affairs.

He married Donna Angela Manfrè-Renda on 19 April 1746 in Alcamo, and had 4 children:

1. Donna Francesca Concetta de Blasi (Alcamo, 1746-?), married to Dr. Don Antonio Mangione on 20 April 1777 in Alcamo
2. Donna Maria Anna de Blasi (Alcamo, 1747-?), married to Don Pietro Domina in Alcamo. Through their daughter Rosalia, he is Gisella Giovenco's 6th great-grandfather
3. Don Benedetto de Blasi (1749–1751)
4. Don Benedetto de Blasi (Alcamo, 1752-Alcamo, 27 January 1783)

== See also ==
- Mount Bonifato
- Small Church of Saint Anne (Alcamo)
- San Giacomo della Spada, Alcamo
- Church of Saint Nicholas of Bari (Alcamo)

== Sources ==
- F.M. Mirabella: Cenni degli alcamesi rinomati in lettere, arti, armi e santità; Alcamo, tip. Gaetano Surdi, 1876
- F.M. Mirabella: Memorie Biografiche Alcamesi; Alcamo, tip. Segesta e figli, 1924
- Ignazio De Blasi: Discorso storico della opulenta città di Alcamo situata a piè del Monte Bonifato e dell'antichissima cittù di Longarico; trascrizione del manoscritto originale e realizzazione di Lorenzo Asta; Alcamo, 1989, II volume
- "alcamesi illustri". Archived from the original on 9 March 2016.
- "Gli studi di archeologia del territorio di Alcamo" (PDF). Archived from the original (PDF) on 5 January 2015.
