= Michelangelo Celesia =

Italian Roman Catholic Cardinal and Archbishop (1814–1904)

His Eminence Michelangelo Celesia O.S.B. Cas.
- Archbishop of Palermo
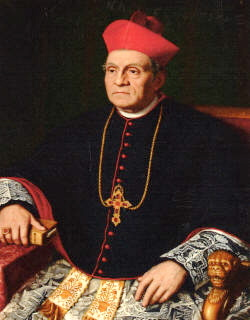
- Church: Roman Catholic Church
- Archdiocese: Palermo
- See: Palermo
- Appointed: 27 October 1871
- Term ended: 14 April 1904
- Predecessor: Giovanni Battista Naselli Morso e Montaperto
- Successor: Alessandro Lualdi
- Other post: Cardinal-Priest of San Marco (1887–1904)
- Previous posts: Abbot Ordinary of Montecassino (1850–58); Bishop of Patti (1860–71); Cardinal-Priest of Santa Prisca (1884–87)

Orders
- Ordination: 24 July 1836 by Domenico Benedetto Balsamo
- Consecration: 15 April 1860 by Girolamo d'Andrea
- Created cardinal: 10 November 1884 by Pope Leo XIII
- Rank: Cardinal-Priest

Personal details
- Born: Pietro Geremia Celesia; 13 January 1814 Palermo, Kingdom of Naples
- Died: 14 April 1904 (aged 90) Palermo, Kingdom of Italy

Styles of Michelangelo Celesia, O.S.B. Cas.
- Reference style: His Eminence
- Spoken style: Your Eminence
- Informal style: Cardinal
- See: Palermo

Michelangelo Celesia, O.S.B. Cas. (13 January 1814 – 14 April 1904) was an Italian Benedictine monk who served as the Archbishop of Palermo from 1871 until his death, and was elevated to the cardinalate in 1884.

== Early life ==
He was born Pietro Geremia Celesia in Palermo in 1814, the son of Lancellotto Celesia, Marchese of Sant'Antonino, and Giuseppa Caruso Azzolini. Through his sister, Donna Francesca Paola Celesia, he is Gisella Giovenco's 2nd great-granduncle. His paternal grandmother was Isabella Renier, from Venice, daughter of Daniele Renier, who was the brother of the Doge Paolo Renier.

As a teenager, he felt called to become a monk of the Monastery of San Martino della Scala in his native city, which belonged to the Cassinese Congregation of the Order of Saint Benedict. He was received as a candidate of the monastery in 1833 and, at admission into the novitiate, he was given the religious name of Michelangelo. He made his solemn profession on 15 January 1835 and was ordained to the priesthood on 24 July 1836.

== Career ==
Celesia later served in various positions at the monastery in Palermo from 1840 to 1846, such as lector of philosophy, dean, professor of dogmatic theology. He was then appointed to serve as prior and Master of novices of the congregation's monastery in Messina, and later of the monastery in Militello. He was named Abbot of the renowned Abbey of Monte Cassino, by papal decree, on 25 March 1850 and General Procurator of the congregation in 1858, as well as Abbot of Farfa Abbey.

On 23 March 1860, Celesia was appointed Bishop of Patti by Pope Pius IX, receiving his episcopal consecration on the following 15 April from Cardinal Girolamo D'Andrea. The Benedictine attended the First Vatican Council, and was later named Archbishop of Palermo on 27 October 1871.

Pope Leo XIII named him a Cardinal Priest, with his titular church that of Santa Prisca, in the consistory of 13 November 1884. Celesia opted for the titular church of San Marco on 25 November 1887. Although eligible, he was unable to participate in the papal conclave of 1903 due to ill health.

== Death ==
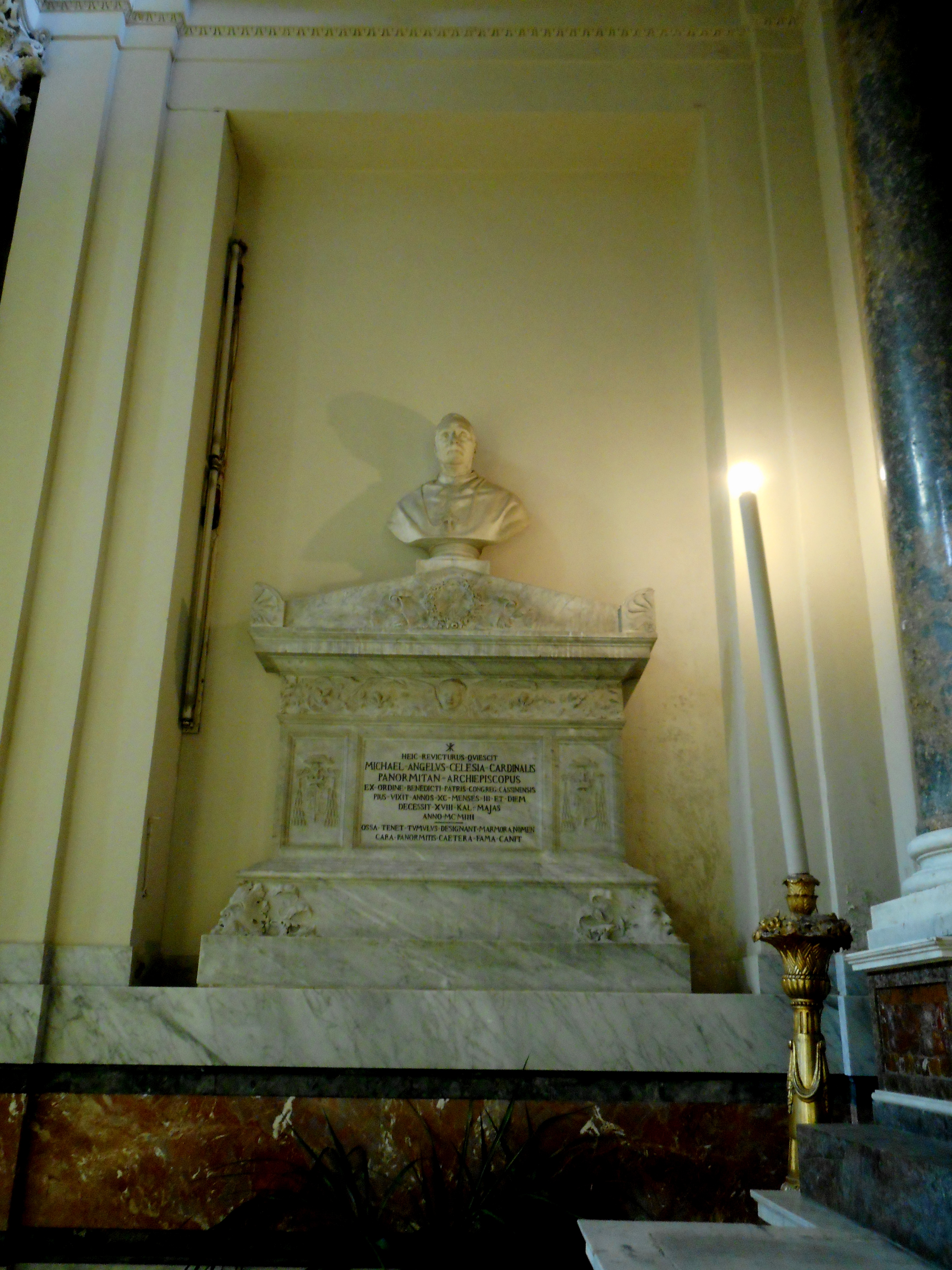
Tomb of the Cardinal

Celesia died in Palermo the following year, at the age of 90, at which time he was the oldest living cardinal. After lying in state in the Palermo Cathedral, he was buried in the church of the Capuchin friars in Palermo. His remains were transferred several years later to a side chapel of the cathedral.

Catholic Church titles
Preceded by Martino Orsino	Bishop of Patti; 1860–1871	Succeeded by Ignazio Papardo, C.R.
Preceded by Ferdinando Pignatelli, C.R.	Archbishop of Palermo; 1871–1904	Succeeded by Alessandro Lualdi
Records
Preceded by Luigi di Canossa	Oldest living Member of the Sacred College; 12 March 1900 – 14 April 1904	Succeeded by François-Marie-Benjamin Richard
