= Giovanni Paternò =

Italian Roman Catholic prelate (died 1511)

Most Reverend Giovanni Paternò
- Archbishop of Palermo
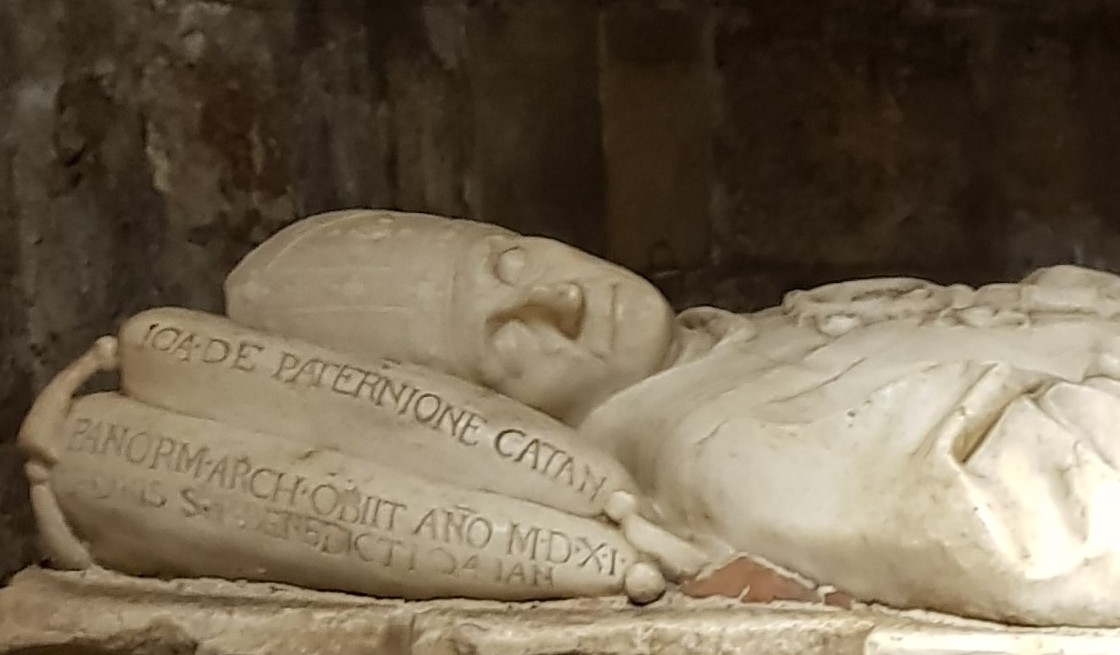
- Church: Catholic Church
- Archdiocese: Archdiocese of Palermo
- In office: 1489–1511
- Predecessor: Pierre de Foix, le jeune
- Successor: Francisco de Remolins
- Previous post: Bishop of Malta (1479-1489)

Personal details
- Died: 1511 Palermo, Italy

Giovanni Paternò or in latin Johannes de Paternione (died 1511) was a Roman Catholic prelate who served as Archbishop of Palermo (1489 –1510), Cardinal (1510) and Bishop of Malta (1479 –1489).

== Biography ==
On 8 Jan 1479, Giovanni Paternò was appointed by Pope Sixtus IV as Bishop of Malta. On 6 Jul 1489, he was appointed by Pope Innocent VIII as Archbishop of Palermo. He served as Archbishop of Palermo until his death in 1510 and Cardinal in 1510-1511.

== External links and additional sources ==
- Cheney, David M. "Archdiocese of Palermo". Catholic-Hierarchy.org. (for Chronology of Bishops) ^{[self-published]}
- Chow, Gabriel. "Metropolitan Archdiocese of Palermo (Italy)". GCatholic.org. (for Chronology of Bishops) ^{[self-published]}

Catholic Church titles
Preceded by Antonio de Alagona	Bishop of Malta; 1479 –1489	Succeeded by Pierre de Foix, le jeune
Preceded by Pierre de Foix, le jeune	Archbishop of Palermo; 1489 –1511	Succeeded by Francisco de Remolins
