= Pietro Jerónimo Martínez y Rubio =

Archbishop of Palermo

Most Reverend Pietro Jerónimo Martínez y Rubio
- Archbishop of Palermo
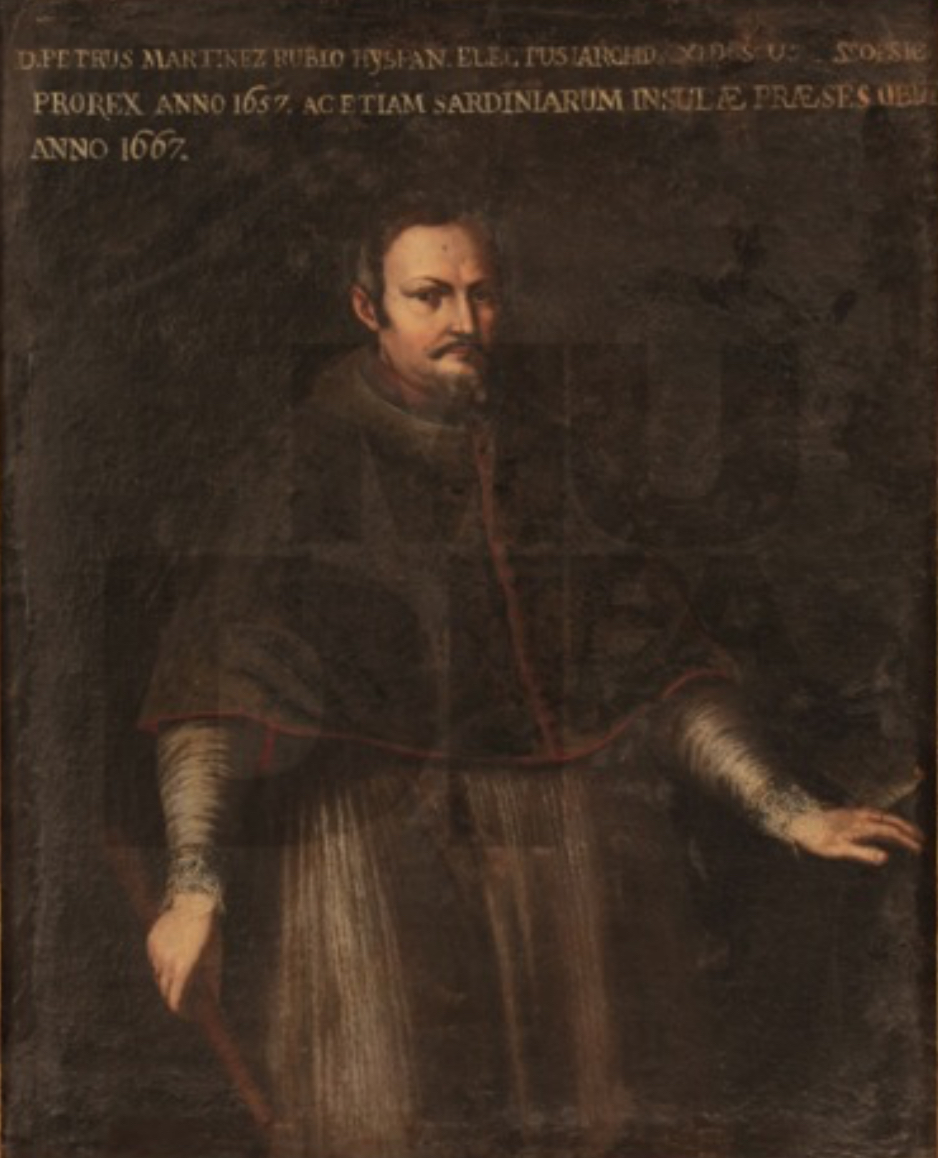
- Church: Catholic Church
- Archdiocese: Archdiocese of Palermo
- In office: 1656–1667
- Predecessor: Martín de León Cárdenas
- Successor: Juan Lozano

Orders
- Consecration: 2 April 1657 by Francesco Barberini

Personal details
- Born: 30 November 1614 Ródenas
- Died: 22 November 1667 (aged 52) Palermo, Italy

Pietro Jerónimo Martínez y Rubio or simply Pietro Martinez y Rubio (30 November 1614–22 November 1667) was a Roman Catholic prelate who served as Archbishop of Palermo (1656–1667).

== Biography ==
Pietro Jerónimo Martínez y Rubio was born on 30 November 1614, in Ródenas, the son of Juan and Anna Gomez y Corbatón.

On 22 September 1656, Pietro Jerónimo Martínez y Rubio was selected as Archbishop of Palermo and confirmed by Pope Alexander VII on 15 January 1657. On 2 April 1657, he was consecrated bishop by Francesco Barberini, Cardinal-Bishop of Porto e Santa Rufina, with Francesco Gonzaga, Bishop of Cariati e Cerenzia, and Patrizio Donati, Bishop Emeritus of Minori serving as co-consecrators. He served as Archbishop of Palermo until his death on 22 November 1667.

While bishop, he was the principal consecrator of Francesco Arata, Bishop of Lipari (1663).

== External links and additional sources ==
- Cheney, David M. "Archdiocese of Palermo". Catholic-Hierarchy.org. (for Chronology of Bishops) ^{[self-published]}
- Chow, Gabriel. "Metropolitan Archdiocese of Palermo (Italy)". GCatholic.org. (for Chronology of Bishops) ^{[self-published]}

Catholic Church titles
Preceded by Martín de León Cárdenas	Archbishop of Palermo; 1656–1667	Succeeded by Juan Lozano
