= Martín de León Cárdenas =

Roman Catholic bishop (1584–1655)

Most Reverend Martín de León Cárdenas
- Archbishop of Palermo
- Church: Catholic Church
- Archdiocese: Archdiocese of Palermo
- In office: 1650–1655
- Predecessor: Fernando Andrade Castro
- Successor: Pietro Jerónimo Martínez y Rubio
- Previous posts: Bishop of Trivento (1630–1631); Bishop of Pozzuoli (1631–1650)

Orders
- Consecration: 20 May 1630 by Laudivio Zacchia

Personal details
- Born: 1584 Archidona, Spain
- Died: 15 November 1655 (aged 70–71) Palermo, Italy

Martín de León Cárdenas, O.S.A. (1584 – 15 November 1655) was a Roman Catholic prelate who served as Archbishop of Palermo (1650–1655), Bishop of Pozzuoli (1631–1650), and Bishop of Trivento (1630–1631).

== Biography ==
Martín de León Cárdenas was born in Archidona, Spain, and ordained a priest in the Order of Saint Augustine. On 13 May 1630, he was appointed during the papacy of Pope Urban VIII as Bishop of Trivento. On 20 May 1630, he was consecrated bishop by Laudivio Zacchia, Cardinal-Priest of San Pietro in Vincoli. On 7 April 1631, he was appointed during the papacy of Pope Urban VIII as Bishop of Pozzuoli. On 27 August 1650, he was appointed during the papacy of Pope Innocent X as Archbishop of Palermo. He served as Archbishop of Palermo until his death on 15 November 1655.

Between 1608 and 1615 Cárdenas wrote a picaresque novel, The Orphan's Story, describing a young boy's travels in the Spanish Empire, with locations including Lima, Potosi, Puerto Rico and Cadiz, and accounts of Sir Francis Drake's attack on Puerto Rico and the sacking of Cádiz. The Puerto Rico account includes a letter from one of the generals who fought Drake there. Cardenas arranged for the novel's publication in 1621 under the nom de plume of Andrés de León, but it remained unpublished, and the manuscript was only rediscovered in 1965.

== Episcopal succession ==
While bishop, he was the principal co-consecrator of:

- Gaspar de Borja y Velasco, Archbishop of Seville (1630);
- Tommaso d'Ancora (Ariconi), Bishop of Mottola (1630); and
- Gil Carrillo de Albornoz, Archbishop of Taranto (1630).

== External links and additional sources ==
- Cheney, David M. "Diocese of Trivento". Catholic-Hierarchy.org. (for Chronology of Bishops) ^{[self-published]}
- Chow, Gabriel. "Diocese of Trivento (Italy)". GCatholic.org. (for Chronology of Bishops) ^{[self-published]}
- Cheney, David M. "Diocese of Pozzuoli". Catholic-Hierarchy.org. (for Chronology of Bishops)^{self-published}
- Chow, Gabriel. "Diocese of Pozzuoli". GCatholic.org. (for Chronology of Bishops)^{self-published}
- Cheney, David M. "Archdiocese of Palermo". Catholic-Hierarchy.org. (for Chronology of Bishops) ^{[self-published]}
- Chow, Gabriel. "Metropolitan Archdiocese of Palermo (Italy)". GCatholic.org. (for Chronology of Bishops) ^{[self-published]}

Catholic Church titles
Preceded by Girolamo Costanzo	Bishop of Trivento; 1630–1631	Succeeded by Carolus Scaglia
Preceded by Lorenzo Monzonís Galatina	Bishop of Pozzuoli; 1631–1650	Succeeded by Juan Bautista Verchi de Campania
Preceded by Fernando Andrade Castro	Archbishop of Palermo; 1650–1655	Succeeded by Pietro Jerónimo Martínez y Rubio
