= Gisella Giovenco =

Italian painter, stylist and publicist

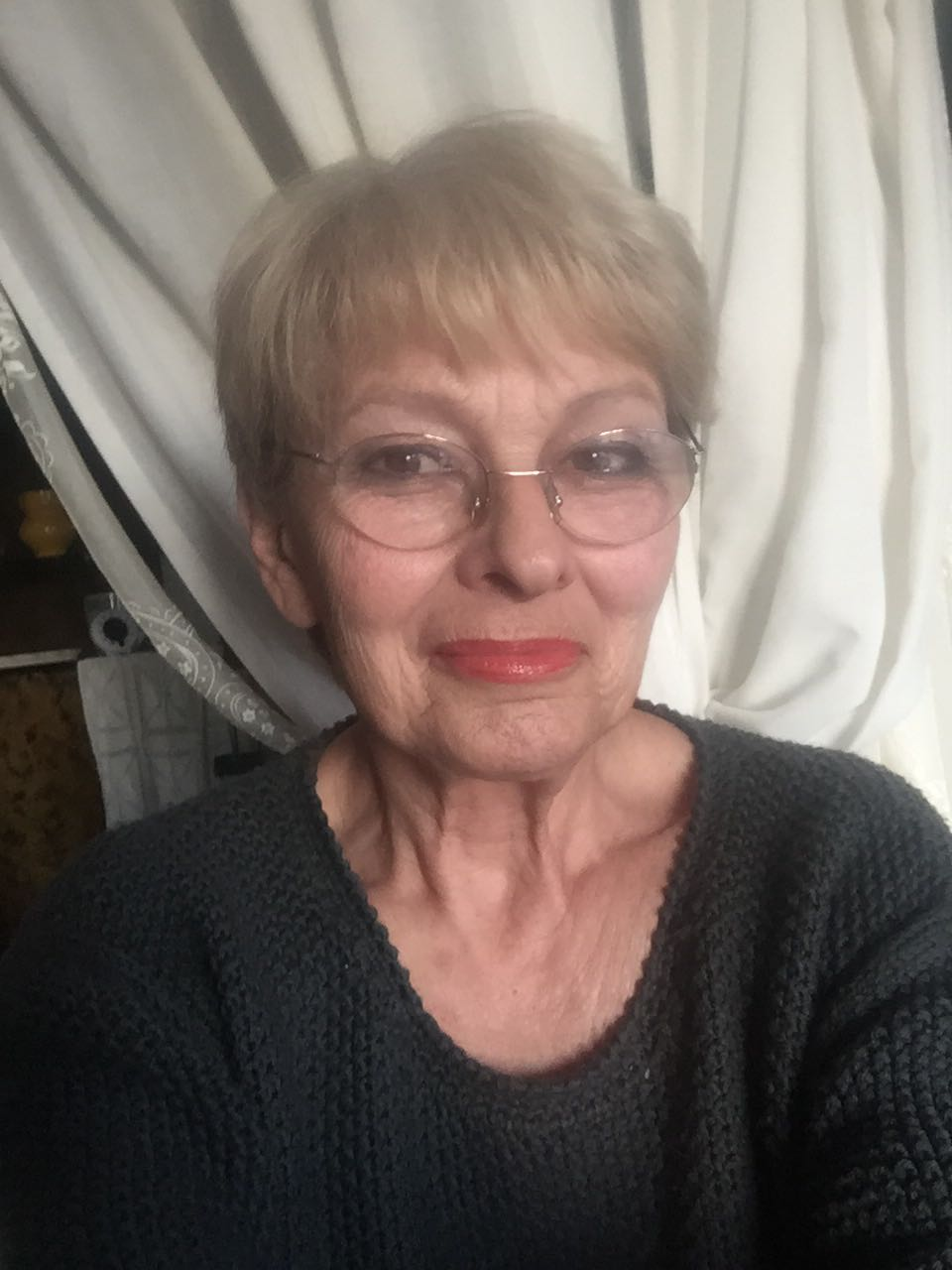
- Born: 30 January 1946 (age 80); Ferrara, Emilia-Romagna, Italy
- Occupations: Painter, stylist and publicist
- Spouse: Matteo Nadalini (deceased)
- Children: 1
- Parent(s): Onofrio Giovenco, Afra Mariani
- Relatives: Ignazio De Blasi, 6th great-grandfather Michelangelo Celesia, 2nd Great-granduncle Francesco Mistretta, 3rd great-grandfather

Gisella Giovenco (Ferrara, 30 January 1946) is an Italian painter, stylist and publicist.

== Biography ==
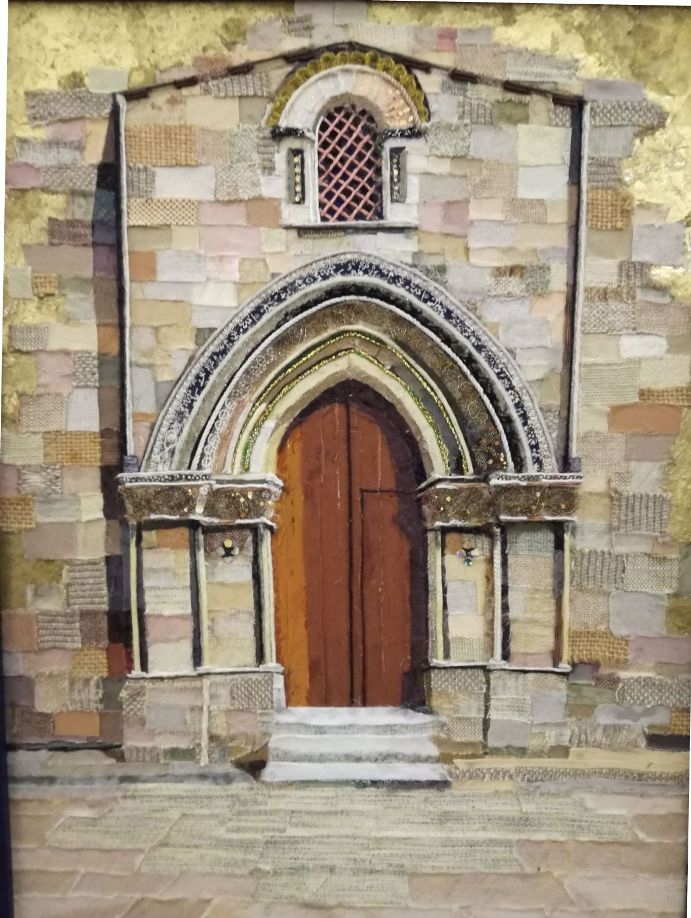
The portal of the Church of Saint Thomas(Alcamo)

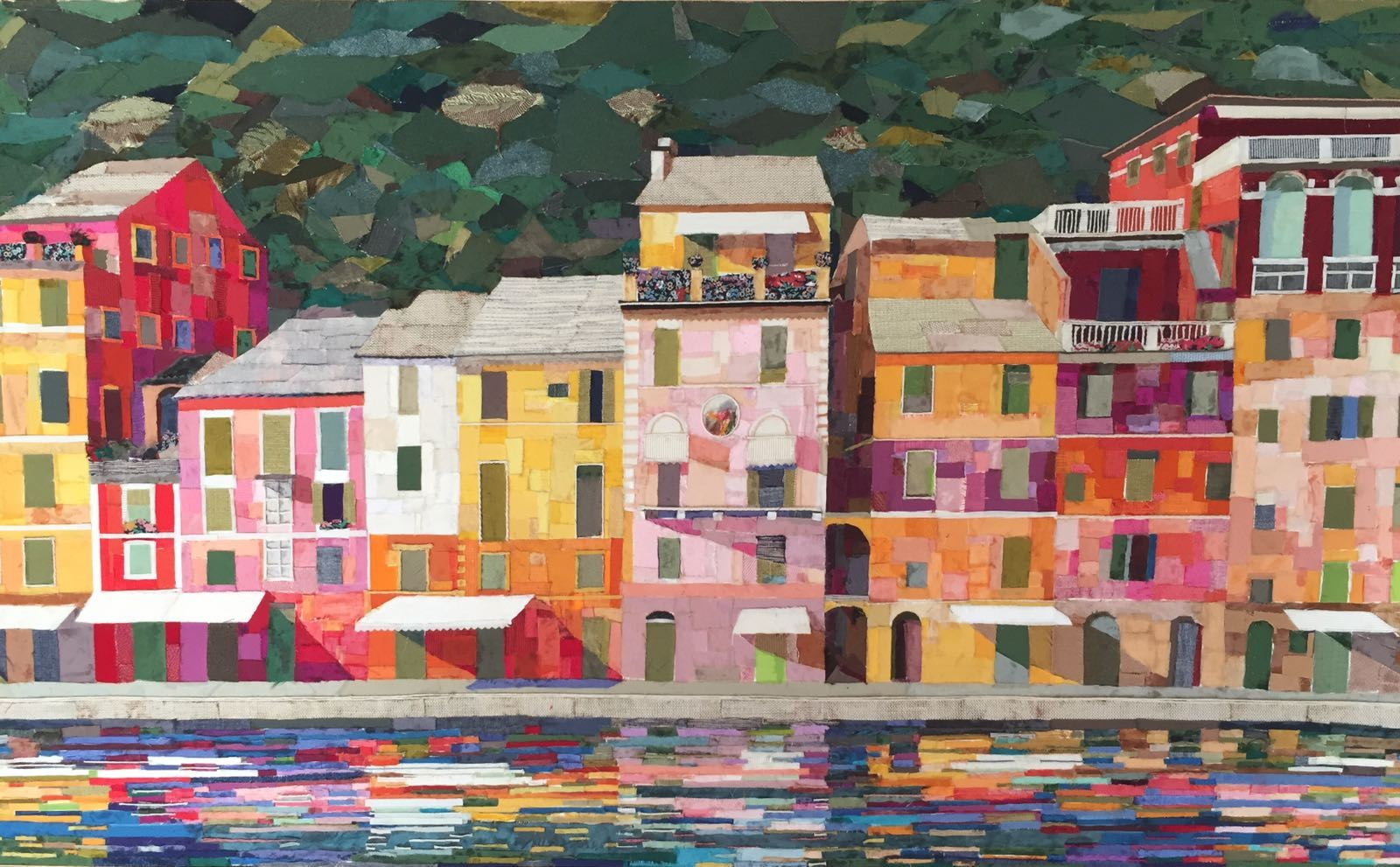
A landscape of Portofino

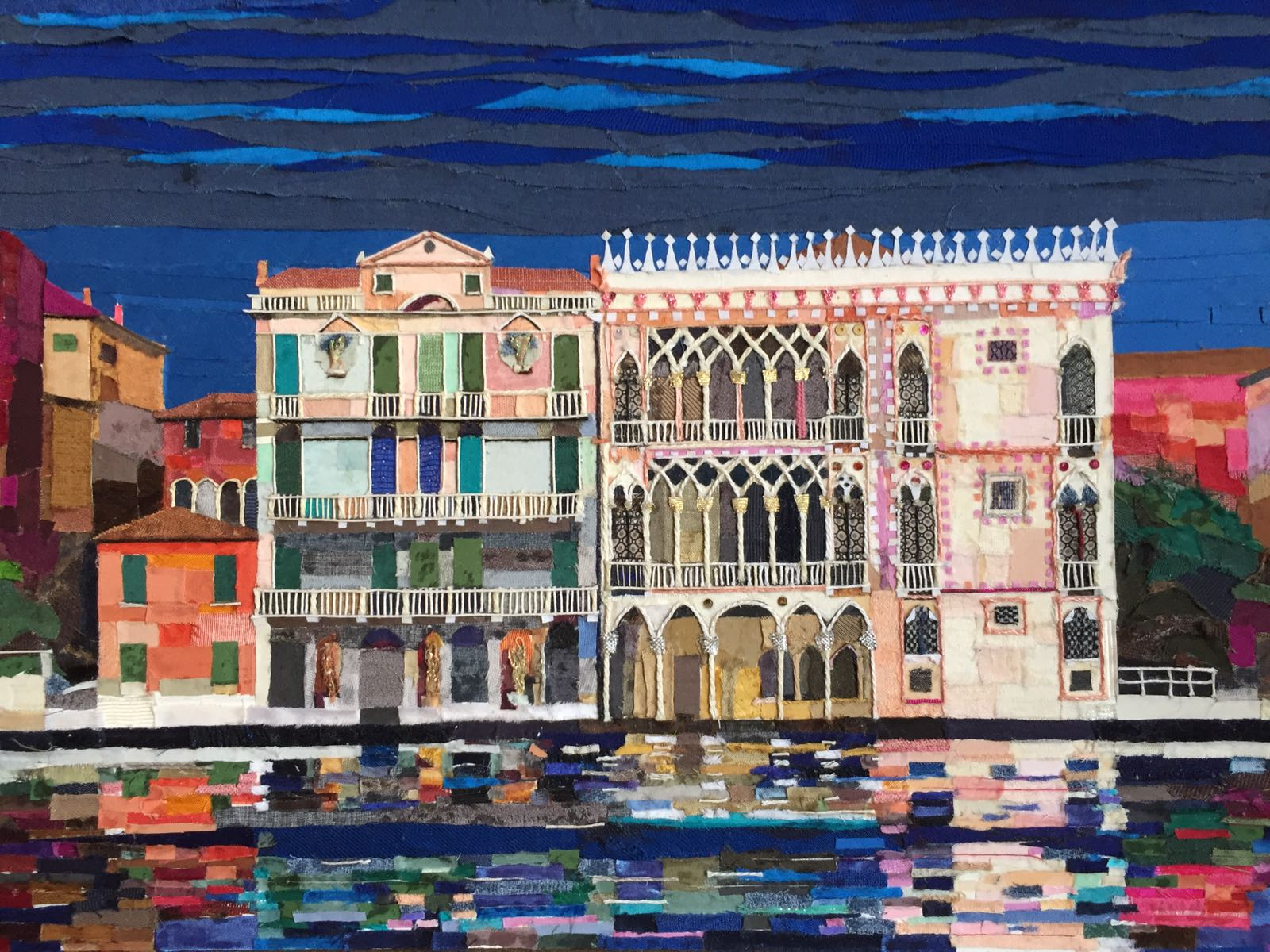
Venice: Palaces on the Canal Grande

Gisella Giovenco was born in 1946 in Ferrara: her father, Onofrio Giovenco (1909-2001), was a Sicilian doctor from Alcamo, while her mother, Afra Mariani, was originary from Ferrara; she has been living at Bogliasco (Genova) since 1948; she attended the Liceo Artistico Nicolò Barabino in Genoa and had the painters Bassano and Alberto Nobile, and the sculptor Valdieri Pestelli as teachers. Her paternal grandparents, Don Vincenzo Giovenco (1880-1954), and Donna Caterina Mistretta (1886-1950), were Sicilian nobles.

She started painting in 1965, taking part in extemporaneous and collective exhibitions in Italy, France, Venezuela and USA; since 1968 she has almost exclusively set personal exhibitions in Genoa, Milan, Bergamo, Agrigento, Tokio, Osaka, Hiroshima, Hakata.

In 1979 she is quoted in the "Bolaffi" Catalogue, and in 1980 met Tito Fontana, a composer who wanted to put some painted landscapes to music; so in 1981 they realized the art show "Sounds and colours" at the Galleria Cortina in Milan, where Tito Fontana composed a piece for each painting: all of them with a soundtrack, music, and light synchronized on the work inside the gallery in the dark: painting and music together, telling the same emotions.

Gisella Giovenco realizes different covers of jazz Lps for "Studio 7" and DIRE and collaborates in the realization of the pieces that Fontana composes to set Pope John Paul II’s poems to music which, after Sarah Vaughan’s concert held in Düsseldorf, becomes an LP.

In the 1990s, she was a victim of chronic fatigue syndrome, after getting through the first stage of this disease but not in a perfect form yet, she can devote herself to painting, but as she keeps a dog and a cat at home and the oil canvases, leaning everywhere, are drying very slowly, in order to avoid any imaginable inconveniences, she invents a new personal technique by using the silk cuttings of the remainings from the creation of some of her fashion collections.

What Vittorio Sgarbi will define as cloth intarsias in his presentation of the volume "Omaggio alla Cristianita’ ", were born: "a very detailed work looking for, among thousands of remnants, the desired shape and the right hue: the distinctive characteristics of silk give the possibility of getting some shades, variegations and chromatic reflections really original and unique in their kind".

The subjects represented by Gisella Giovenco, the churches’ façades, are as original as their realization: a mosaic placed on a background painted in a uniform way, enriched by shiny silk pieces which highlight the preciousness of capitals and decorations, and produce an exceptional chromatic effect, very realistic but also different from photography.

As her source of inspiration, Giovenco selects the subjects and images coming from the Holy Tradition and Christianity, that she considers authentic masterpieces and inestimable values of the Italian cultural patrimony, with the aim of enhancing them, making them as the absolute protagonists of her creations. According to the artist, only if you are aware of the importance of your own culture, you can respect and understand the others.

In 2005, in the parish Church of Bogliasco, with the collaboration of the Confraternity of Santa Chiara and the patronage of the municipality of Bogliasco, the artist exhibited some 40 of her paintings (both oil and intarsias), giving the proceeds of them to a cultural iniziative which was a matter of concern for many fellow citizens: the restoration of the façade of the ancient Oratory of Santa Chiara; the title given to this exhibition was 40 chiese per Santa Chiara (that is:forty churches for Santa Chiara).

In 2009 she collected part of the 150 façades of the churches she had already ‘’painted’’ in a book, entitled Omaggio alla Cristianità: the presentation was written by Vittorio Sgarbi and the preface by cardinal Angelo Bagnasco.

In 2011, with the technique of Trompe-l'œil, she painted three walls of the hall of the parish Church of Bogliasco and, with the same technique, the four sails of the ceiling of the veranda in Villa Crovetto (a senior home) in the district of San Bernardo in 2012.

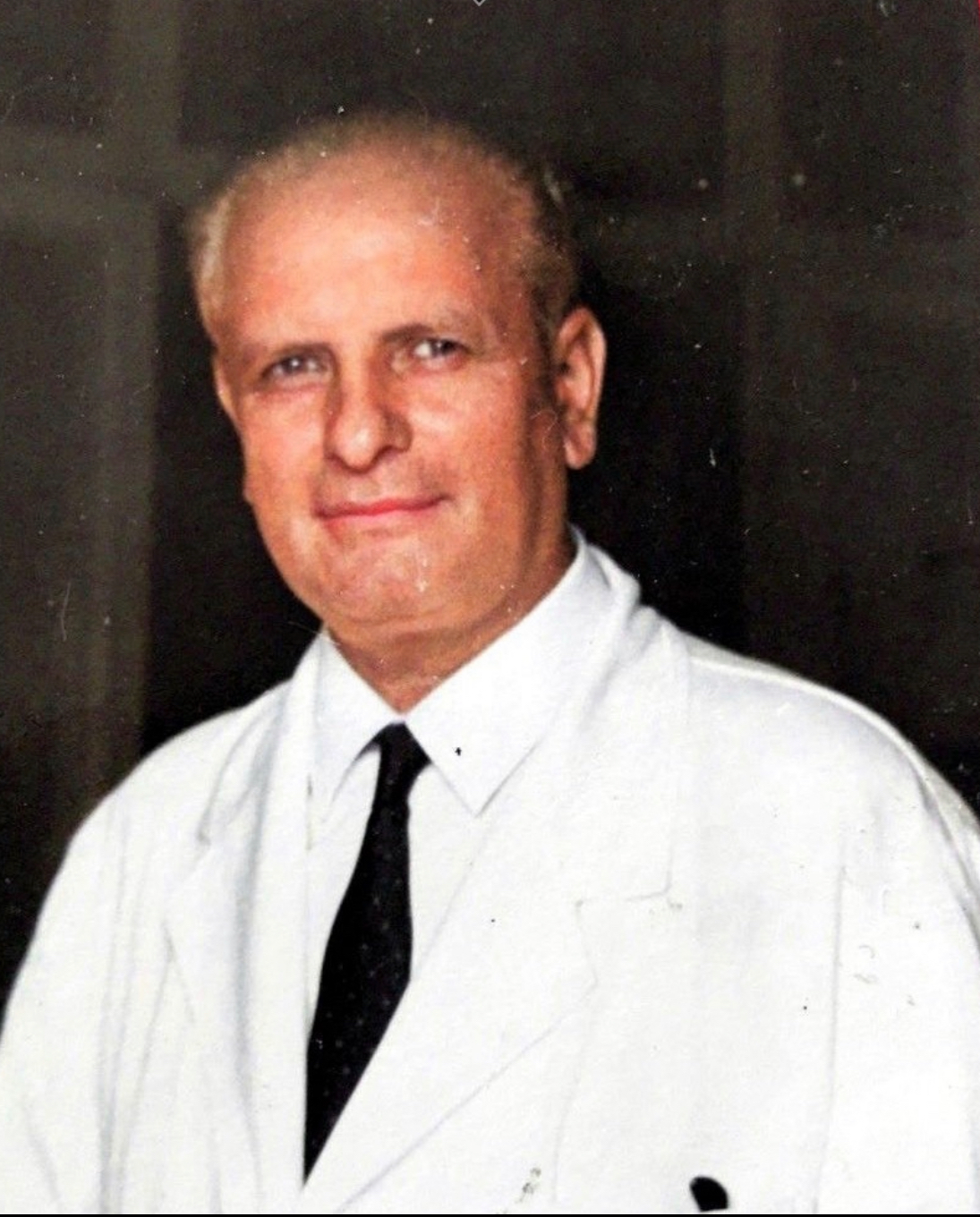
Onofrio Giovenco

Finally, in December 2017, Gisella Giovenco decided to donate seven of her works to Alcamo, the hometown of her father, doctor Onofrio Giovenco, a pediatrician who practised his profession in Liguria, achieving notoriety for his scientific discoveries that were also published on international reviews, and for his long fight in favour of the reintegration of the yacht Elettra which belonged to Guglielmo Marconi.

== Family ==
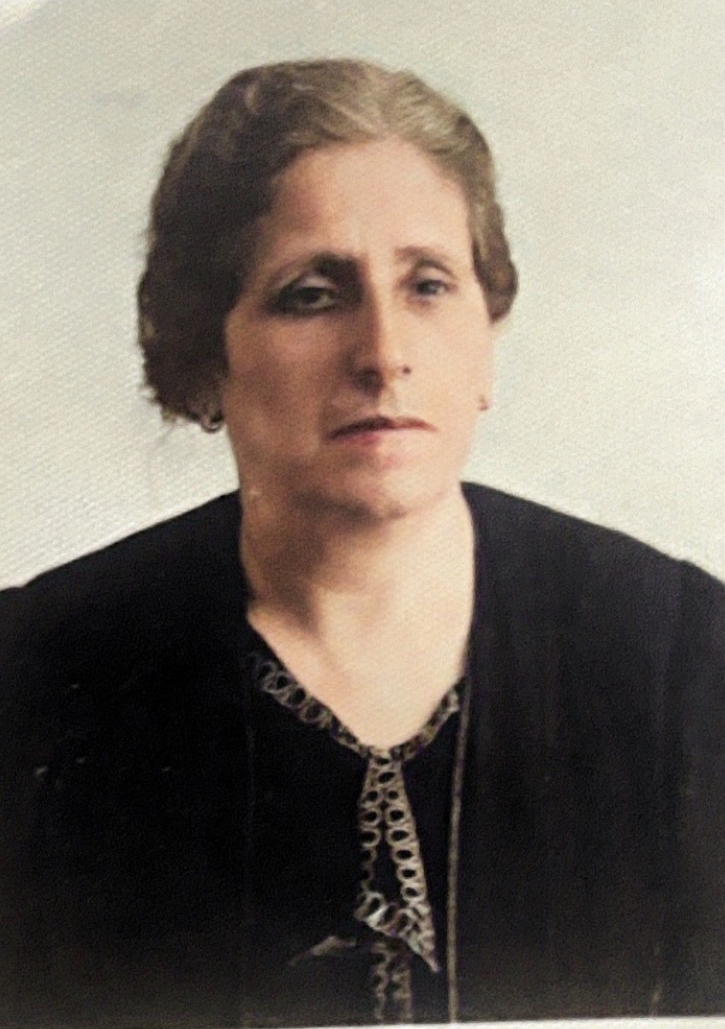
Her paternal grandmother, Donna Caterina Mistretta (1886-1950)

Her paternal family was from an important family of Alcamo. Her great-grandfather, Dr. D. Onofrio M. Giovenco served as a doctor at the Battle of Calatafimi. Her grandfather, D. Vincenzo M. Giovenco, operated the first cinema in Alcamo. Her grandmother, D.na Caterina Mistretta was a Sicilian noblewoman, great-granddaughter of the politician Francesco Mistretta, 4th great-granddaughter of Ignazio De Blasi and Great-Grandniece of Michelangelo Celesia, who gifted her rosaries, still owned by the family - supposedly descended from the Borromeo family and the Casero family. She was married to Matteo Nadalini, until his death. They had 1 child.

Ancestors of Gisella Giovenco

8. Dr. Onofrio Maria Giovenco (1836-1911)
4. Don. Vincenzo Maria Giovenco (1880-1954)
9. Donna Caterina Rimi (1842-1899)
2. Onofrio Giovenco (1909-2001)
10. Don Leonardo Mistretta (1847-1915)
5. Donna. Caterina Mistretta (1886-1950)
11. Donna Giovanna Messina
1. Gisella Giovenco
12. Alfredo Mariani
6. Pietro Rino Mariani (1901-1973)
13. Alberta Bottini
3. Afra Mariani
14. Giovanni Capucci
7. Maria Capucci (1900-1990)
15. Carmela

== Stylist ==
In 1983 she creates some collections of men’s leatherware and designs women’s handbags; between 1991 and 1992 she produces some collections of women’s fashion. Then Giovenco works together with Sergio Soldano’s atelier for the brand management, approaching the world of perfumes: three years later the result is a patent for the realization of perfumes personalized inside the shops at the time of sale, which was to be followed by a line of cosmetology personalized too; unfortunately the commercialization was suddenly stopped owing to her disease: chronic fatigue syndrome.

=== Activity as a publicist ===
In 1979 she met Renzo Cortina, the famous gallerist and bookseller from Milan who entrusted her with the composition of L’angolo del libro at Antennatre. Among some 30 of her guests were: Gina Lagorio, Nantas Salvalaggio, Giulio Bedeschi, Carlo Castellaneta, Alberto Lattuada, Romano Battaglia, Alberto Bertuzzi, Alberto Bevilacqua, Renato Pozzetto, Luciano Sechi and Paolo Mosca. In the ‘80s she started working for Il Giornale Nuovo in the fashion advertorials. Besides Indro Montanelli she met Gianni Granzotto, Cesare Biazzi Vergani, Marcello Staglieno. She collaborates with the editorial board in Genoa.

In 1987 Giovenco wrote a series of interviews to famous personalities called Com’erano da piccoli -Infanzia e adolescenza di persone conosciute -.(How they were when they were children- infancy and adolescence of celebrities) Paolo Villaggio, Ornella Vanoni, Giorgio Soavi, Arnaldo Pomodoro, Gino Paoli, Ottavio Missoni, Bruno Lauzi, Ugo Gregoretti, Mino Damato, Walter Chiari, Carlo Castellaneta, Gianni Baget Bozzo, Enzo Biagi Alberto Bertuzzi, Pippo Baudo, Enrico Baj. It was published by Rebellato in 1993. In April 1994 she took part in the television programme Maurizio Costanzo Show, where she presented her book.

=== Exhibitions ===
- 1967: Collective at the galleria "Chiesa di S. Romano" in Ferrara.
- 1969: Galleria "Il Cigno" at via Manzoni in Milan (presented by Mario Lepore).
- 1972: "Galleria Guidi" in Genoa.
- 1973: invited to take part, with 10 works, in the exhibition of Istituto Italiano di Cultura of Tokyo, held in Tokyo, Osaka, Hiroshima, Hakata.
- 1976: Palazzo Comunale of Sperlonga;
- 1976: 1° Premio "Foemina", Genova;
- 1976: invited by Circolo Sannitico, at Palazzo della Prefettura in Campobasso;
- 1976: "Galleria Tasso" in Bergamo (personal).
- 1977: collective at Palazzo Comunale in Sperlonga;
- 1979: con "Les artists d’Italie" in Parigi;
- 1979: personal at Galleria "La Polena" at Forte dei Marmi;
- 1979: 10 works at Galleria "Eastern Star" di Agrigento;
- 1979: 10 works at Palazzo Bonaiuto in Caltagirone.
- 1979: Galleria "La Polena" at Forte dei Marmi.
- 1980: Rossana Bewik prepares an exhibition for her in Canada, in Montreal.
- 1981: Galleria Cortina di Milano, Suoni e colori in collaboration with Tito Fontana

At Portofino she successfully tries out the first paintings with her technique.

- 2000: Spazio San Carpoforo in Milano, she exhibits some 30 works created with silk intarsias
- 2012: Biennale Torinese, extension of the 54th Venice Biennale curated by Professor Vittorio Sgarbi, at Sala Nervi in Turin. She exhibited a work dedicated to Pope John Paul II.
- 2012: Intarsi d’arte, at Milano Art Gallery Spazio Culturale in Milan

=== Publications ===
- Com'erano da piccoli - infanzia e adolescenza di persone conosciute; San Donà di Piave: Rebellato Ed., 1993
- Suoni e Colori, ed.Direarte, Milano, 1981.

A particular edition where music and painting are linked; an Italian jazz trio with Sante Palumbo and Tito Fontana at the piano and Luigi Tognoli at the sax tenor. The cover design is realized by Gisella Giovenco; the cover can be opened and contains 16 drawings made by Giovenco and photographated by Franco Bottino, the list of the pieces, each one corresponding to one of the artist's paintings.

- Omaggio alla Cristianità; with the presentation by Vittorio Sgarbi and the preface by Cardinal Angelo Bagnasco; publisher: IL CITTADINO

== See also ==
- Museum of Contemporary Art of Alcamo
- Vittorio Sgarbi
- Angelo Bagnasco

== Sources ==
- Alcamo-Pittrice dona sette quadri di chiese alla città
- Biografia. Gisella Giovenco
- Intervista a Gisella Giovenco, in occasione della mostra personale
- Un mosaico di stoffa per le chiese
- Le opere esposte
- Archived copy
- Maurizio Costanzo show
