= Francesco Mistretta =

Sicilian Politician (1798–1862)

Director of the Departments of Grace and Justice and Ecclesiastical Affairs of the Kingdom of the Two Sicilies
- In office 1853–1860
- Monarchs: Ferdinand II of the Two Sicilies, Francis II of the Two Sicilies

Prefect of the Police of Palermo
- In office 15 November 1841 – 1848
- Monarch: Ferdinand II of the Two Sicilies

Attorney General of the King
- In office 1848–1853
- Monarch: Ferdinand II

Personal details
- Born: 28 March 1798 Alcamo, Kingdom of Sicily
- Died: 20 December 1862 (aged 64) Alcamo, Kingdom of Italy
- Spouse: Paola Simeti
- Children: 8
- Education: University of Palermo
- Profession: Lawyer & Magistrate

Francesco Mistretta (Born Francesco Mistretta e Domina, Alcamo, 28 March 1798 – Alcamo, 20 December 1862) was a Sicilian jurist, magistrate, and politician of the Kingdom of the Two Sicilies, serving as Director of Ecclesiastical Affairs from 1853 to 1860. Prior to 1853 Mistretta held several notable judicial and administrative positions in Sicily, including Vice–President of the Gran Corte Criminale of Palermo. In 1862 he was accused by the Italian authorities of involvement in several anti-liberal attacks in Sicily, and was identified by some accounts as a possible organiser of the 1862 Revolt of Castellammare del Golfo.

== Biography ==
Francesco Mistretta was born Francesco Rosario Cristoforo Mistretta e Domina in Alcamo, Sicily. He was the son of Don Antonino Mistretta (1762–1808), and his wife Donna Rosalia Domina. Through his mother he was a relative of Ignazio De Blasi. The Mistrettas were a well established Alcamese family who arrived in Alcamo from Salemi in c. 1715. At age 10, Mistretta was sent to the Seminary of Mazara del Vallo, but left aged 16 and decided to enrol himself at the University of Palermo, studying medicine. But in 1816, Mistretta chose to abandon medicine in favour of law.

Mistretta was married to Donna Paola Simeti (1803–1865), an Alcamese noblewoman, and had 8 children. Through his son, Antonino, he is the 3rd great-grandfather of Gisella Giovenco, and through his daughter Vincenza, he is the father-in-law of Sebastiano Simeti, Mayor of Alcamo.

Ancestors of Francesco Mistretta

8. Don Matteo Mistretta
4. Don Giuseppe Mistretta
9. Donna Vincenza Scibilia
2. Don Antonino Mistretta(1762–1808)
10. Antonino Ganci
5. Donna Vincenza Ganci
11. Francesca Vivona
1. Francesco Mistretta (1798–1862)
12. Giuseppe Domina
6. Don Pietro Domina
13. Maria Reggina
3. Donna Rosalia Domina
14. Don Benedetto de Blasi
7. Donna Maria Anna de Blasi
15. Donna Lucia Terruso

== Career ==
Mistretta entered the magistracy in 1823. He initially served as a district judge in several Sicilian towns, such as Gibellina, Alcamo, Siracusa, and Caltanisetta, before becoming a judge in the Gran Corte Civile of Trapani and subsequently that of Palermo. In 1832, following an epidemic in his home town of Alcamo, Mistretta was appointed by Archpriest Mons. Giacomo Domina as a member of the sanitary committee that was responsible for the creation of the town hospital.

In 1841 he was appointed Vice–President of the Gran Corte Criminale of Palermo. On 25 May 1841, a royal decree appointed him as interim Prefect of Police of Palermo. His role was confirmed on 15 November 1841, following a subsequent decree issued by Ferdinand II.

Following the Sicilian Revolution of 1848, Mistretta was appointed Attorney General of the King, serving in Catania, Trapani, and Messina, until 1853. Whilst in Messina, Mistretta served in the Gran Corte Civile of the city. In 1853, he was appointed Director of the Departments of Grace and Justice and Ecclesiastical Affairs of the Sicilian Luogotenenza, serving under Ferdinand II and his successor, Francis II of the Two Sicilies. His tenure ended in 1860 following the fall of Sicily to the Kingdom of Italy. Following this, Mistretta moved back to Alcamo.

== Later life and death ==
Following the collapse of Bourbon rule in Sicily in 1860, Mistretta returned to Alcamo. His previous position in the Bourbon administrations placed him under suspicion following the establishment of the new Italian government. In 1862, Mistretta was accused by the Italian authorities of involvement in a number of anti-liberal attacks and disturbances in western Sicily. Some accounts associated him with the 1862 revolt of Castellammare del Golfo, identifying him as a possible organiser of the uprising. Mistretta died in Alcamo on 20 December 1862, aged 64.
