= Panormitanus =

Italian Benedictine canonist and archbishop

Niccolò Tedeschi, O.S.B.
- Archbishop of Palermo
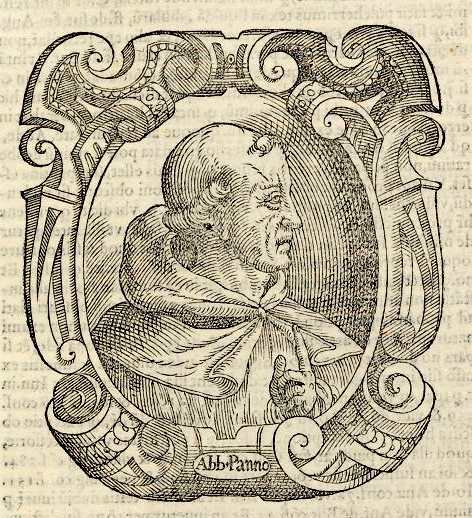
- Church: Catholic Church
- Diocese: Archdiocese of Palermo
- In office: 1434–1445
- Predecessor: Rinaldo Brancaccio

Personal details
- Born: 1386 Catania, Italy
- Died: 24 February 1445 (aged 58–59) Palermo, Italy

Nicolò de' Tudeschi (Panormitanus) (b. at Catania, Sicily, in 1386; d. at Palermo, 24 February 1445) was an Italian Benedictine canonist.

== Life ==
In 1400 he entered the Order of St. Benedict; he was sent (1405-6) to the University of Bologna to study under Zabarella; in 1411 he became a doctor of canon law, and taught successively at Parma (1412–18), Siena (1419–30), and Bologna (1431–32). Meanwhile, in 1425, he was made abbot of the monastery of Maniace, near Messina, whence his name "Abbas", to which has been added "modernus" or "recentior" (in order to distinguish him from Bernard Of Montmirat, commonly referred to as "Abbas antiquus", a thirteenth-century canonist who died about 1288); Panormitanus is also known as "Abbas Siculus" on account of his Sicilian origin.

In 1433 he went to Rome where he exercised the functions of auditor of the Rota and Apostolic referendary. The following year he relinquished these offices and placed himself at the service of Alfonso V of Aragon, King of Sicily, obtaining the See of Palermo, whence his Latin name "Panormitanus" (Palermo in Latin is Panormus). He was confirmed by Pope Eugene IV on 9 March 1435 and consecrated bishop on 4 July.

During the troubles that marred the pontificate of Eugene IV, Nicolò at first followed the party of this pontiff, whom he represented briefly at the Council of Basel; but subsequently he allied himself with the antipope Felix V who, in 1440, named him cardinal. Pius II, in an early work, depicts Panormitanus as lamenting that instructions from Alfonso made him oppose quick action to depose Eugene. Panormitanus represented the Council of Basel at imperial diets that discussed the fight between Eugene and the council.

== Doctrine ==
At a time when the principle of contractual consensualism was not applicable in civil law, Panormitanus was in favor of the use of the denunciatio evangelica, and therefore of recourse to ecclesiastical jurisdictions to obtain the execution of consensual contracts. He wrote thus "And I conclude that where sin feeds on the observance of civil law, as well as in a natural obligation born of consent or when one enriches himself to the detriment of the other, one can have recourse to the Church".

He also extended his reflections by estimating that a principle of non-formalism can be observed for contracts, wills as well as electoral procedures. These views would later be taken up by the theologian Adrian of Utrecht, future Pope Adrian VI, then contested by Francisco de Vitoria and Domingo de Soto.

He also considers, in view of the close relationship between Christian morality and contractual commitment, that when one of the parties to the contract is struck by excommunication, he cannot obtain the execution of the contract. This opinion, which became problematic following the Protestant Reformation, will be strongly evoked by Francisco Suárez and Martin Becanus.

== Works ==
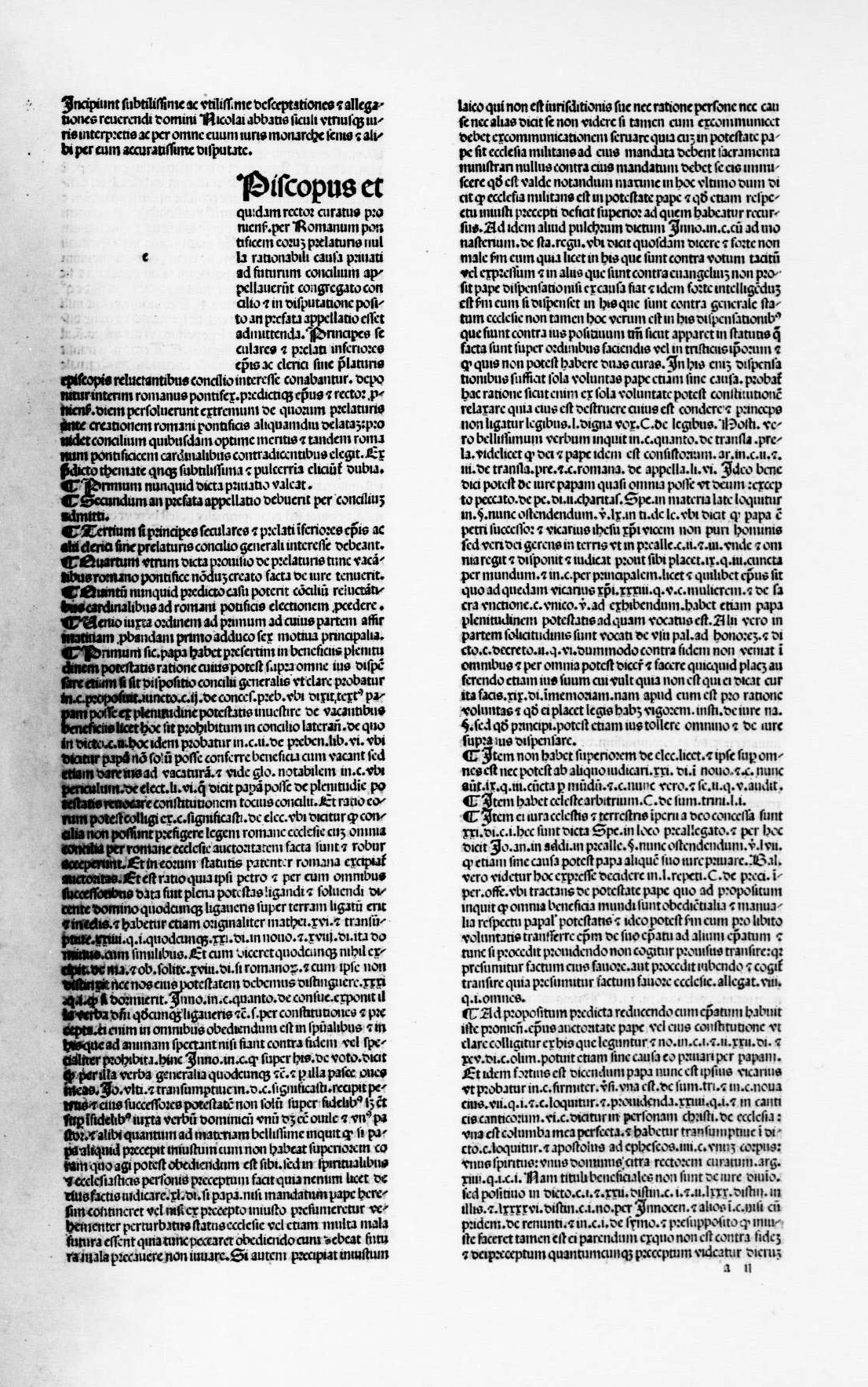
Disceptationes et allegationes, 1487

Medieval scholars referred to Panormitanus with the scholastic accolade of "lucerna juris" (lamp of the law), in honor of his works on canon law. In his "Tractatus de concilio Basileensi" he upheld the doctrine of the superiority of a general council to the pope. This was written for the 1442 Diet of Frankfurt, at which he was opposed by Nicholas of Cusa. His other works include:

- Lectura in Decretales
- In Sextum
- In Clementinas
- Consilia
- Quaestiones
- Repetitiones
- Disputationes, disceptationes et allegationes
- Flores utriusque juris

A fine edition of his works appeared at Venice in 1477; among later, frequent editions, that published in 1617-18 (Venice) in 10 folio volumes is especially notable. There also is a Lyon 1521-1522 edition of the Decretals commentary.
