= Philip of Aragon =

Archbishop of Palermo

Philip of Aragon (Note: Old Spanish: Filip, modern Spanish: Felipe de Aragón y Navarra, Italian: Filippo d'Aragona.) (born between 1449 and 1456, died 1488) was the Archbishop of Palermo from 31 January 1477, when he received confirmation of his election from Sixtus IV until he renounced his see in 1485.

== Birth and early childhood ==
Philip was the eldest son of Charles, Prince of Viana, by his third known mistress, Brianda de Vega. (Note: She is commonly but incorrectly called Brianda de Vaca.) His father was the heir of the kingdom of Navarre as the son of King John II and Queen Blanche I. Philip and his mother are both mentioned for the first time in a document of 13 January 1456, when they were living in Pamplona, in a house owned by the prior of Larraga. Already by that time, Philip had been granted the title Count of Beaufort. By February, Charles had provided his son with a room in the royal palace.

Philip was born in the diocese of Pamplona, but the date of his birth is unclear. According to some sources, he was twenty-seven years old when he was elected archbishop, which places his birth in 1449 or 1450. According to others, his birth most likely took place shortly before he and his mother were first recognised in an official document of the prince's in January 1456.

Philip spent most of his childhood in Barcelona. He and his mother were first summoned there by Charles in 1461, arriving by June. According to Jerónimo Zurita, writing a century later, they lived in the house of Charles's sister, Blanche. Zurita also claims that Charles placed Philip in the charge of a knight named Bernat Sapila and separated him from his mother, although there is little evidence of this in the primary sources. In September, Charles died. On 5 October, in his first known public appearance, Philip took part in the funeral cortege through the streets of Barcelona.

During the war against John II (1462–72), Philip continued to live in Barcelona and receive a daily pension of six sueldos from the anti-kings elected in opposition to John, Peter (V) and René. From Peter he received gifts: a mansion near the monastery of Santa Anna that had previously belonged to Bernat Terré y Dusay and all the goods confiscated from Nicolau Carròs d'Arborea i de Mur, a support of John II. René placed the young Philip under the protection of his son, John II, Duke of Lorraine. Towards the end of the civil war, however, Philip switched his support to John II. René confiscated the house by Santa Anna, but in October 1472 Barcelona was occupied by John II.

== Archiepiscopate ==
As was common in that time, Philip did not live in Palermo, but delegated his administrative duties to two vicars. The vicars were prevented from taking up their office by the senate of the Kingdom of Sicily because they were not Sicilians. Only after lengthy negotiations did Philip nominate a Sicilian canon to the vicariate. The senate still refused to recognise Philip's appointment as Grand Chancellor of the Realm, because he was not a Sicilian citizen. Likewise, the senate even challenged his archiepiscopal election because of an irregularity in the papal rescript of confirmation. Finally, on 9 January 1479, the viceroy, Juan Ramón Folch de Cardona, invested him with the temporalities of his diocese.

In 1481, Philip acquired the abbey of San Giovanni degli Eremiti and the priory of Santissima Trinità di Delia for the diocese. He also acquired the fiefs of Geracello and Sattabene along with other lands in the Val di Mazara for the church. After all the trouble of getting himself installed in his see, he renounced it in 1485 in order to become the Grand Master of the Order of Montesa. He returned to Spain, where he died taking part in the War of Granada in 1488.
