= Museum of Multiethnic Musical Instruments "Fausto Cannone" =

Museum in Alcamo, Italy

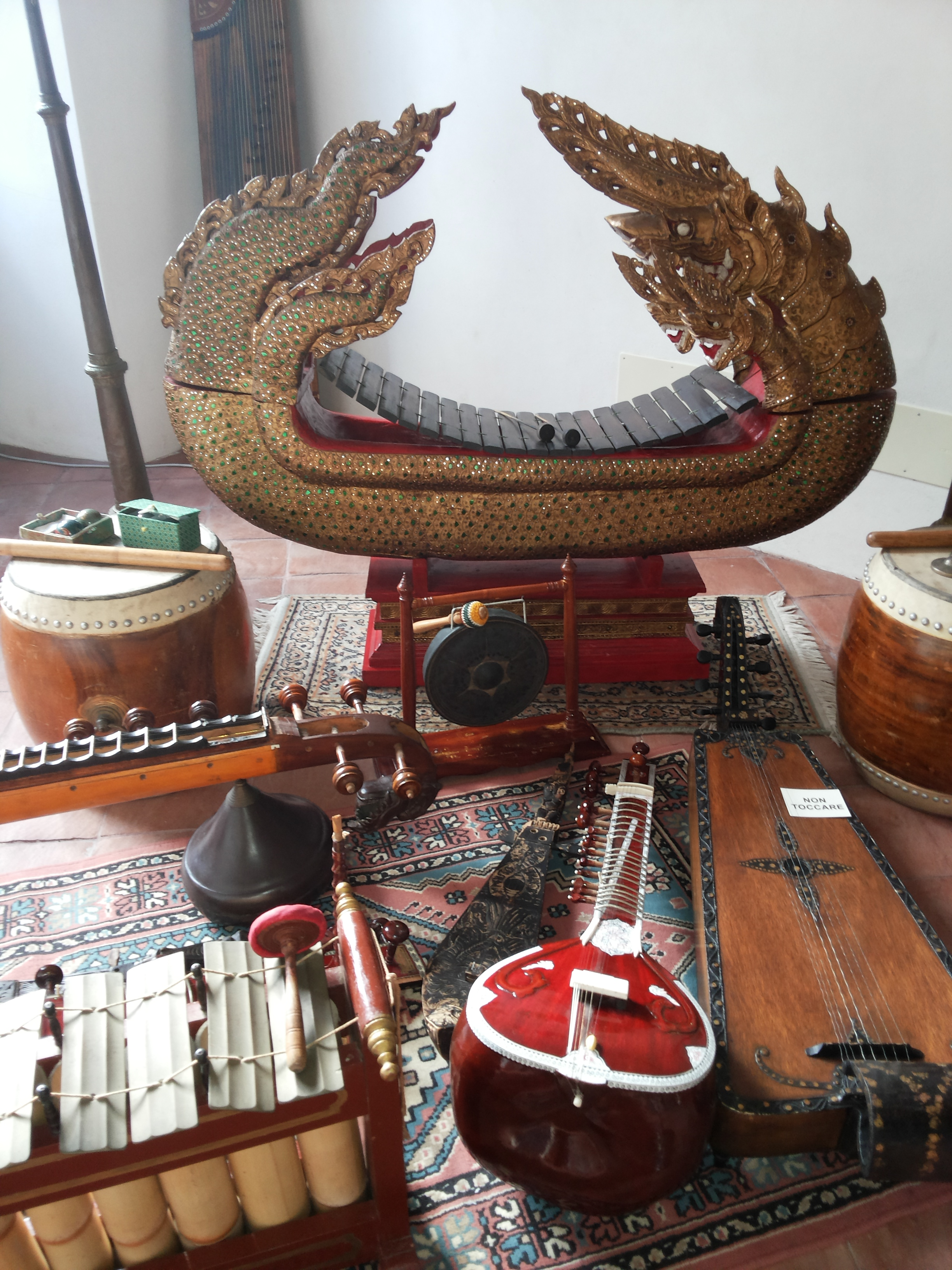
- Instruments in exhibition at Collegio dei Gesuiti (Alcamo)
- Established: 2014
- Location: Ex Church of Saint James of the Sword, 75 Via Commendatore Navarra, Alcamo, Italy
- Coordinates: 37°58′48″N 12°57′59″E
- Website: http://www.comune.alcamo.tp.it/

The Museum of Multiethnic Musical Instruments "Fausto Cannone" is dedicated to music and is located inside the Ex Church of Saint James of the Sword at 75 Via Commendatore Navarra (near the Castle of the Counts of Modica) in Alcamo, Italy.

== History ==
With the deliberation n° 116 of 23 November 2012, the Town Council of Alcamo, approved the steering motion, with the Councillor professor Antonio Fundarò as the first signatory and proposer, named "Institution Museum of Music Fausto Cannone".

On 23 January 2014 the Municipal Administration approved the deliberation relating to the foundation of the "Museum of the Multiethnic Musical Instruments", later inaugurated in July of the same year.

Initially the museum was set in two rooms of the Museum of Contemporary Art of Alcamo inside the Ex Collegio dei Gesuiti, in Piazza Ciullo, at last, in June 2018 the museum has its final seat in the premises of the ex church San Giacomo della Spada.

The museum was established following the donation of a musical instrument collection by Fausto Cannone, creating an ethnographic music collection in the region.

On 25 May 2021, the Municipal Administration initiated a project for the extraordinary maintenance of the San Giacomo della Spada building to ensure the proper conservation of the collection. This project was financed by the local action group (GAL) "Golfo di Castellammare" under the PSR Sicilia 2014–2020 program. The renovation aims to improve the facility for cultural tourism and educational activities.

=== Fausto Cannone ===
The museum's collection was assembled by Fausto Cannone over a 30-year period. During this time, he acquired playable string and wind instruments directly from their regions of origin.

Fausto Cannone had received several requests, even by the Palazzo Steri from Palermo, but he preferred to donate these precious instruments to his hometown. He wanted to dedicate this museum to his father Gaspare Cannone who was a journalist, literary critic, anarchist and antifascist: He lived in the United States for many years, but due to his stands in favour of Sacco and Vanzetti, he was arrested and then forced to get back to Italy.

=== Description and instruments ===
The museum hosts 202 instruments coming from Thailand to Tibet, from New Guinea al South America, from Polynesia to China, from Australia to Argentina, from South Africa to several European countries. The collection includes folk instruments constructed from organic materials, alongside elaborately crafted artifacts.

Among the instruments you can see at the museum there are: flutes, cymbals, drums, bagpipes, accordions, trumpets, violins, guitars, mandolins, harmonicas.

Here is the list:

- crotalok: a three strings instrument from Mauritius, in the Indian Ocean; it is the first of the collection.
- xylophone: played in the buddhist monasteries during their services; the frame is carved in a single block of ebony, representing three dragons, with small tablets of various length.
- Bolivian charango: a very rare instrument obtained from the skin of the armadillo, a threatened species today.
- Italian violin dating back to 1714.
- didjaridn: aerophone with a single hole, given to Fausto Cannone by the head of a tribe of Aboriginal Tasmanians, south-east of Australia.
- ebab, Algeria: bowed string instrument from Afghanistan, and spread by Arabs in North Africa and Mediterranean countries.
- sarinda, stringed instrument of folk music from India or Nepal; similar to a lute and violin; it is played with a bow
- gansira
- swarpeti: wooden instrument, working on a system of foldings, similar to a pump organ
- bansuri, Indian flute
- takita
- marambao
- vojnica
- iakir
- sitar
- bouzuki: Greek or Irish stringed instrument
- rombadao
- guzla: a musical instrument of Serbian and Croatian peoples, similar to a violin, with a curved sound box and a single string derived from horsehair.
- shamir
- banjo
- sanzas (Cameroon): metal or bamboo musical keyboard, with a sound box.
- pìpà: Chinese instrument with 4 strings.
- flute from the Amazon basin
- balalaika from Russia
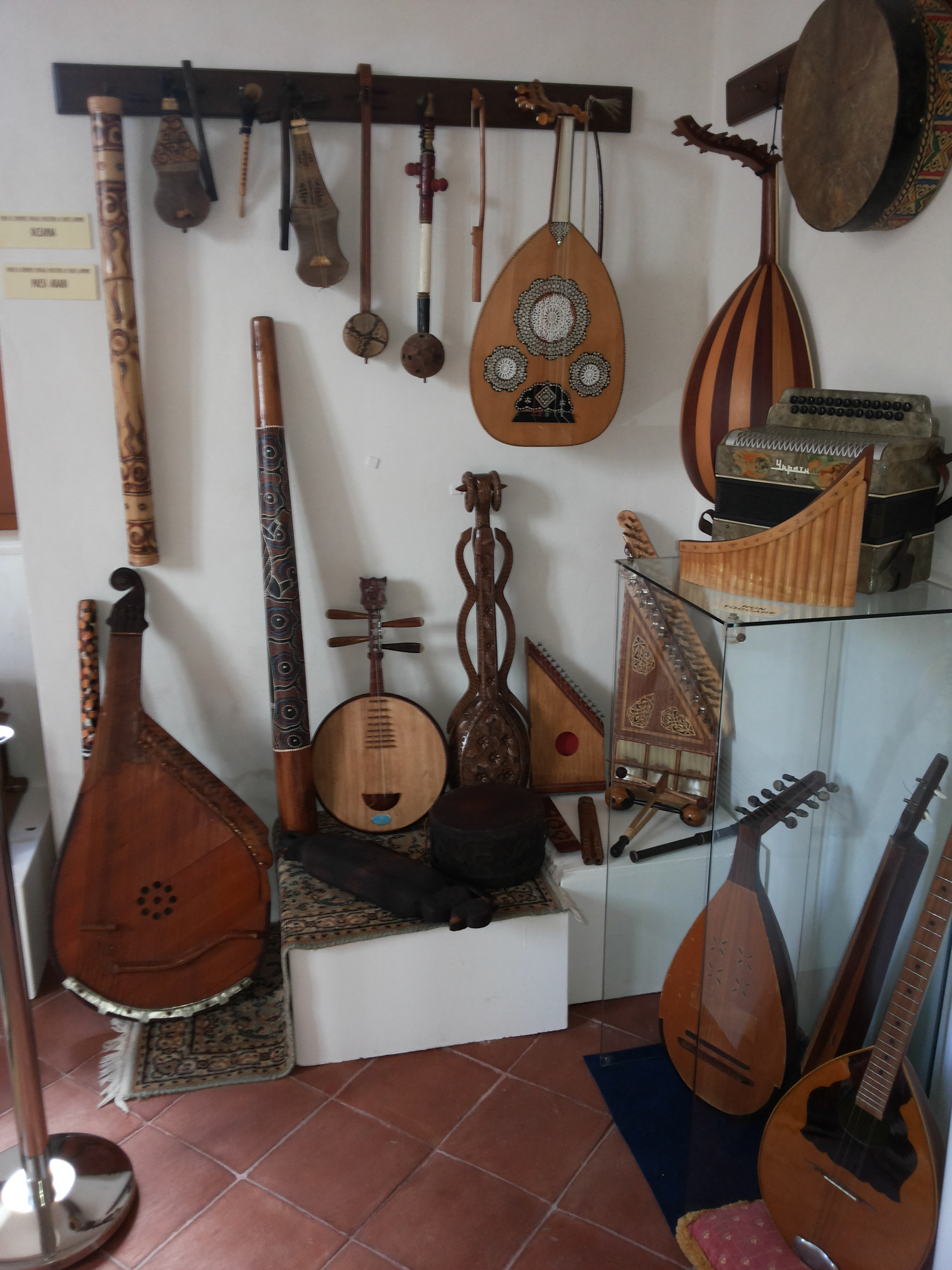
A group of instruments

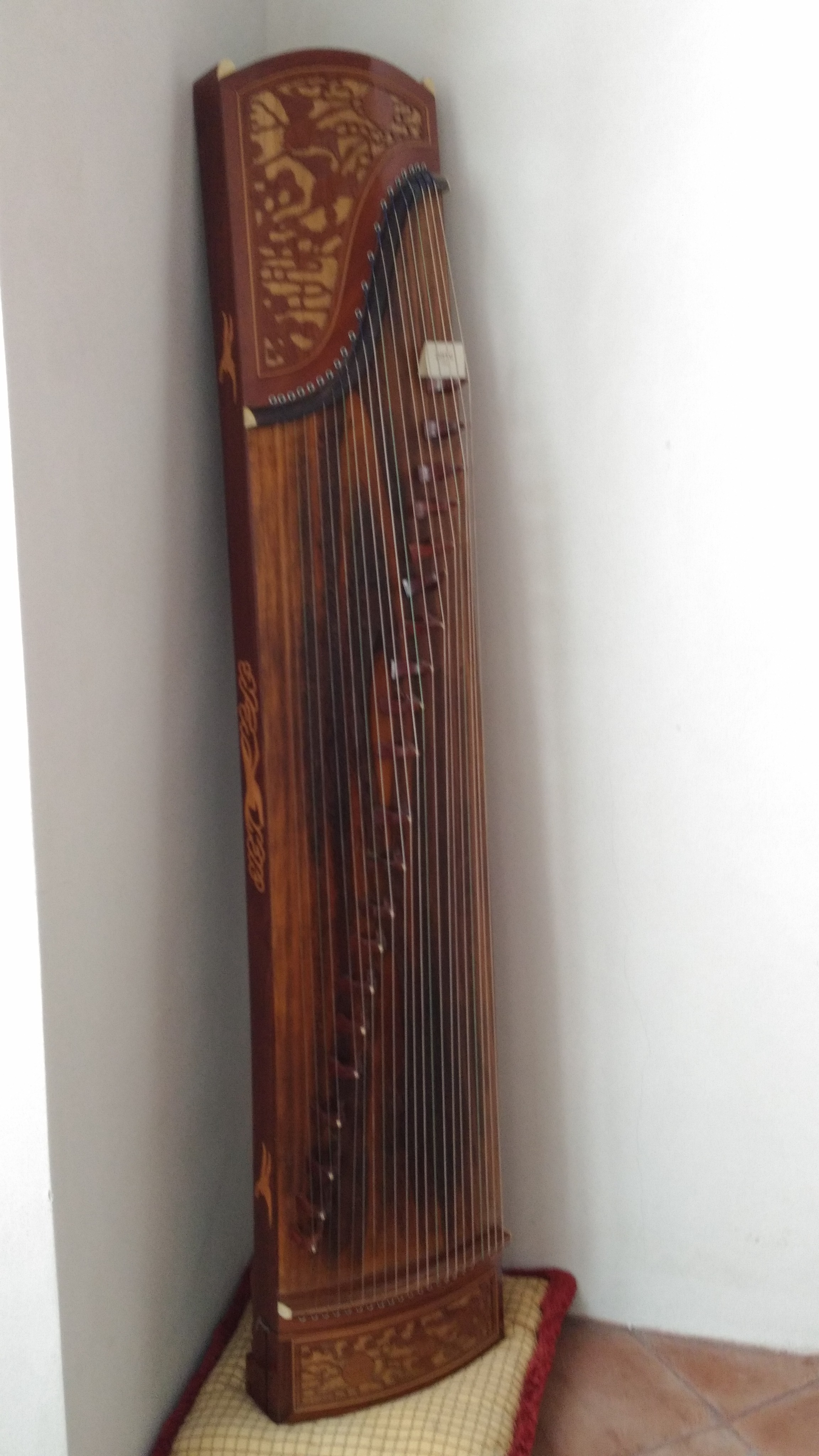
Zheng (an instrument from China)

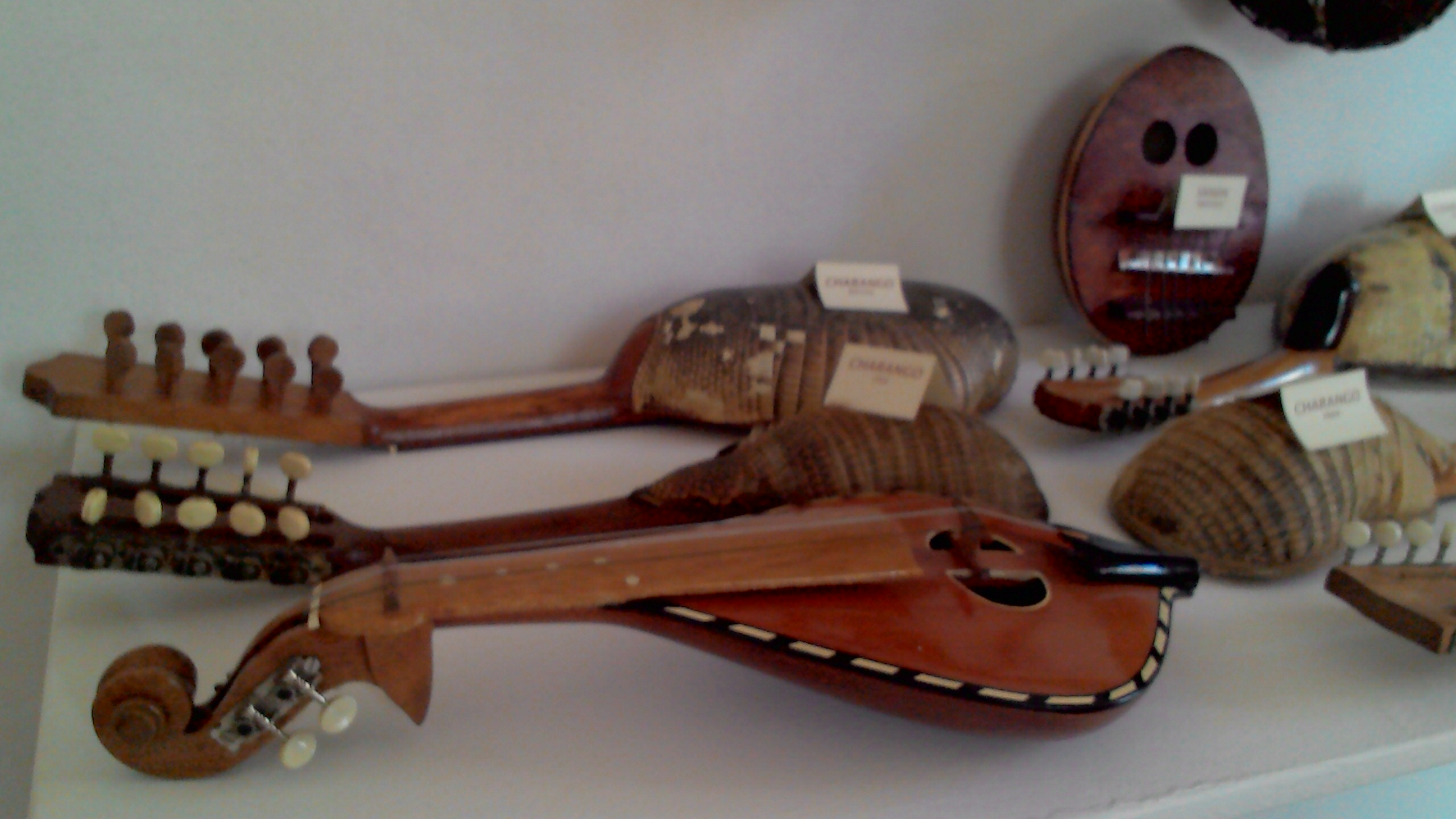
Bolivian Charango

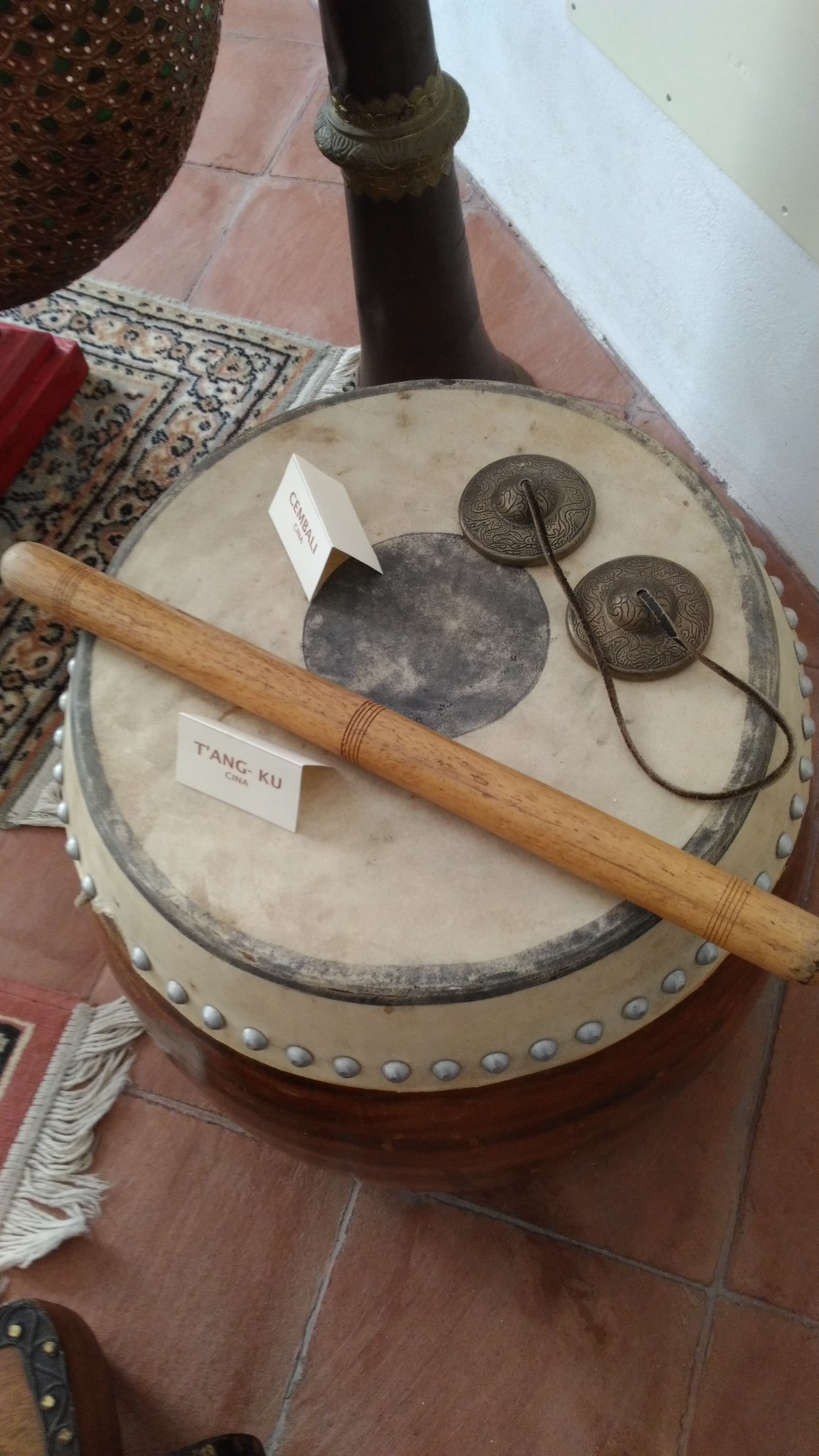
T'ang-ku (China)

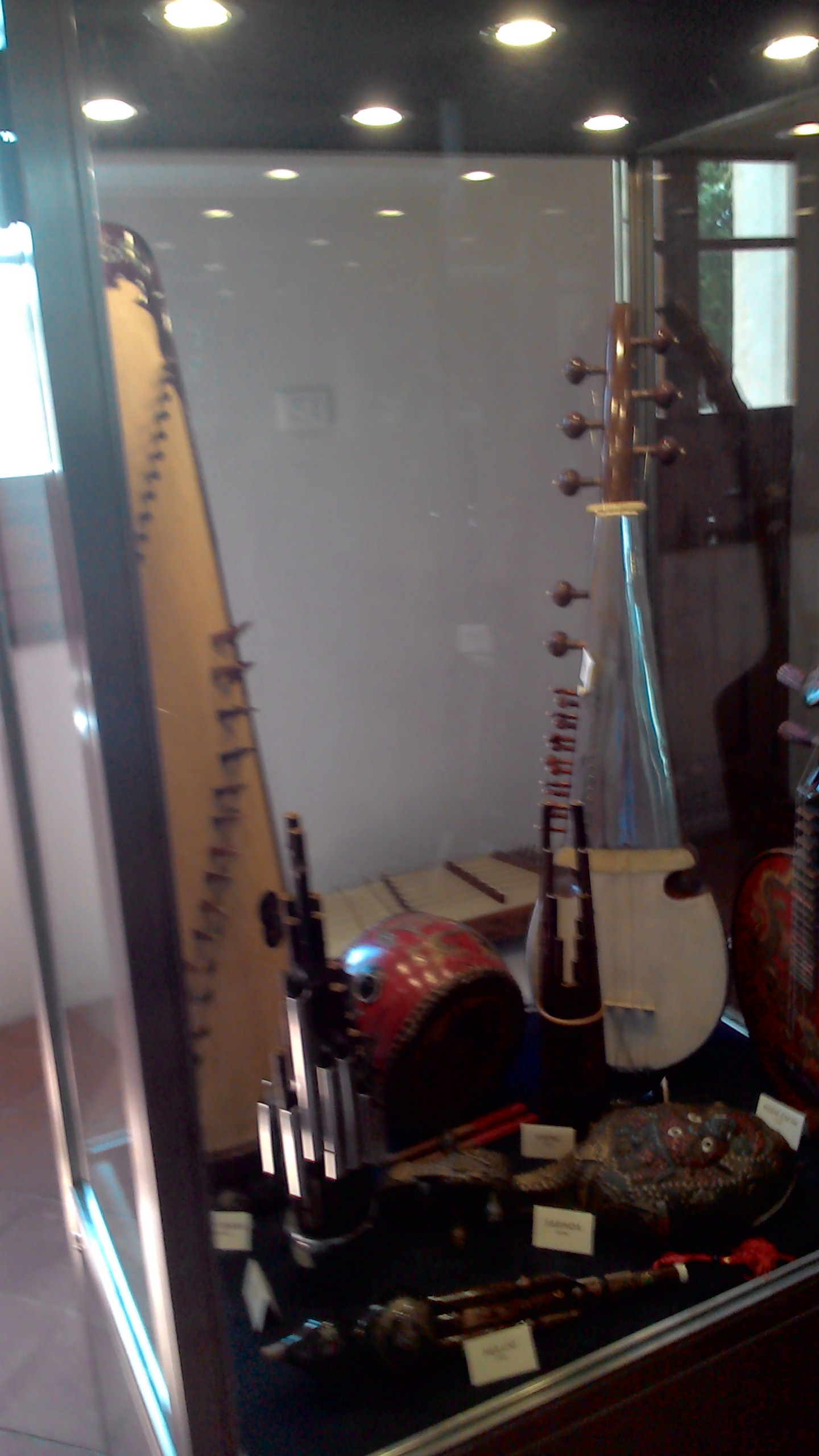
Various instruments

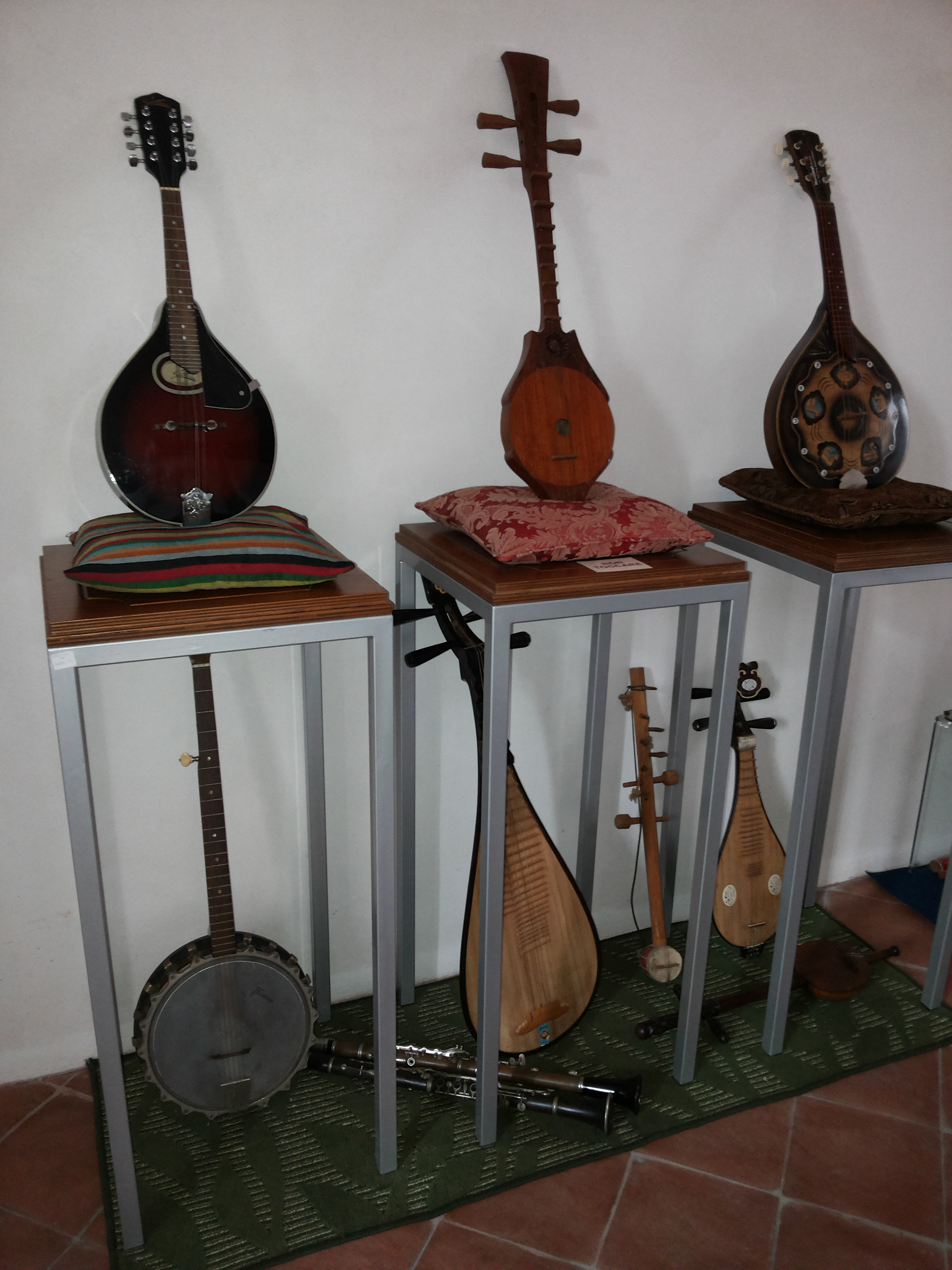
Some chord instruments
- Nanga (Congo or Uganda): with a wooden oval box, wholly closed with skin and with a solid handle inserted, with a side series of tuning pegs which serve to stretch the strings made of guts or fibers.

On the nanga they sing and recite slow melodies praising the leaders’ feats

- Qanun, Egypt: instrument with 78 strings, similar to a trapezoidal citara
- Kornai, Turkestan
- Saran, India
- Pipa, China: instrument with 4 strings belonging to the family of lutes
- Yùeh ch'in (China): one of the main types of lutes with a short Chinese handle, with a circular box.
- T'ang-ku (China)
- Zheng (China)
- Gender or metallophone, Indonesia.
- Berimbau or urmwngo (Brazil): a string musical instrument from Africa, which was spread in Brazil after the importation of African slaves during colonialism. Today it is part of the tradition of music of Latin America; it is made up of a wooden bow which stretches a metal string. A dry and hollow pumpkin operates like a sound box. Two models
- Zither, Austria; string instrument: its strings are stretched over a resonator like in the psaltery. Two models
- Kantele, Finland; instrument with 5 strings, linked by a wooden handle dug to the body and opened in the lower part.
- Gusle, (ex-Jugoslavia): popular instrument with a single string used in Balkans, deriving from the byzantine lyra.

== See also ==
- List of music museums
- Museum of Contemporary Art of Alcamo
- Ex collegio dei Gesuiti

== Sources ==
- https://www.accordo.it/article/viewPub/82943
- http://www.trapaniok.it/7613/Cultura-trapani/il-museo-degli-strumenti-musicali-multietnici-fausto-cannone-di-alcamo-e-la-poliedricita-del-musicista-del-cantautore-del-poeta-del-collezionista-di-emozioni-e-sentimenti#.V9gZJ62s9Z8
- Facebook page
- http://www.bancadonrizzo.it/pdf/rivista2.pdf
- Funso S. Afọlayan, Culture and Customs of South Africa, Greenwood Publishing Group, 2004, ISBN 978-0-313-32018-7.
