= Bomelius =

Bomelius may refer to:

- Bomelius, the familiar of the sorcerer Feats
- Bomelius, fictional character in The Maid of Pskov and The Tsar's Bride
