= Punta Imperatore Lighthouse =

Lighthouse in Italy

Punta Imperatore
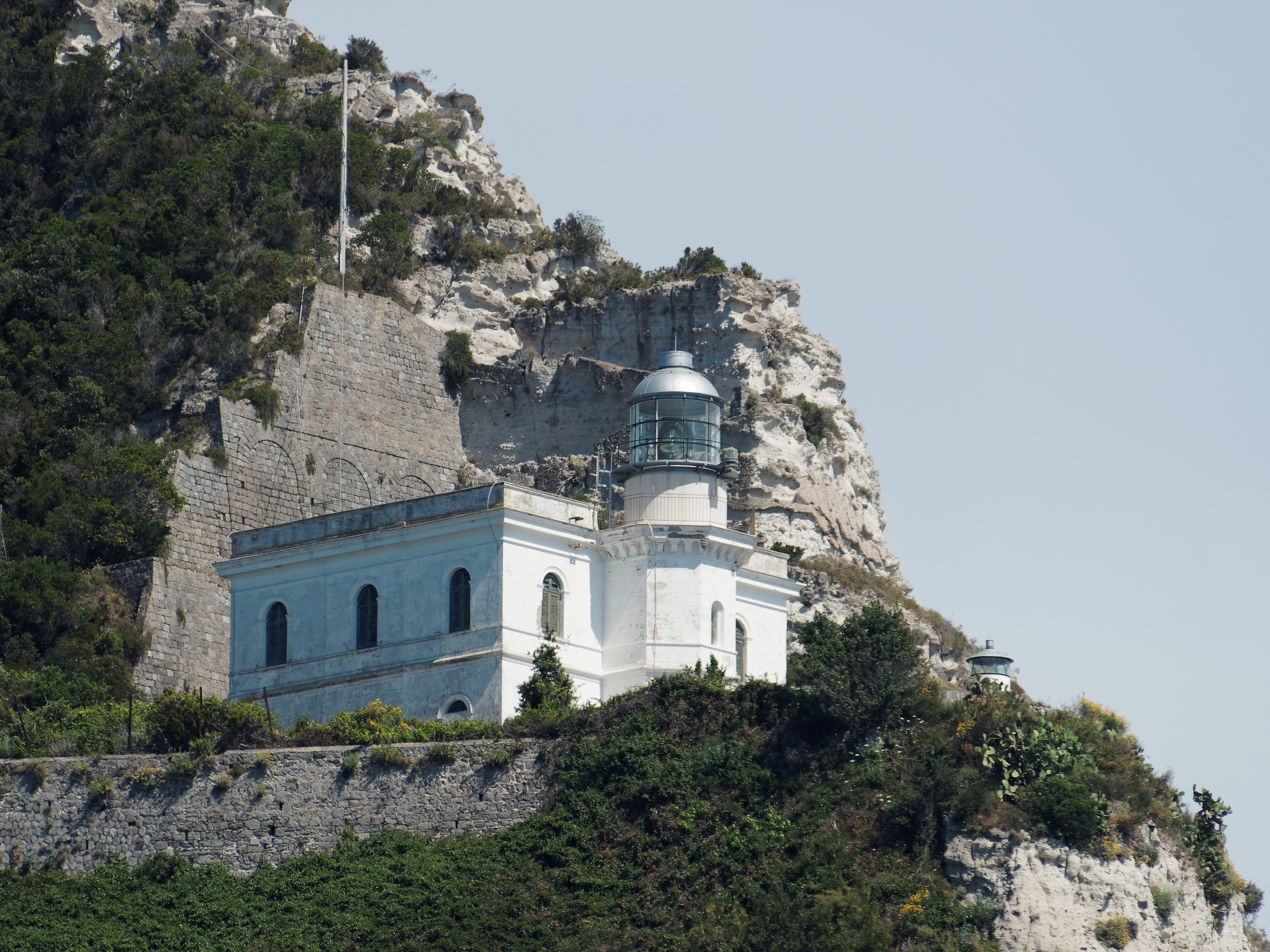
- Punta Imperatore Lighthouse
- Location: Panza; Campania; Italy
- Coordinates: 40°42′40″N 13°51′10″E

Tower
- Constructed: 1884 (first)
- Construction: masonry tower
- Automated: yes
- Height: 13 metres (43 ft)
- Shape: cylindrical tower with balcony and lantern attached to the seaward 2-storey keeper's house
- Markings: white tower, grey metallic lantern
- Power source: mains electricity
- Operator: Marina Militare

Light
- First lit: 1916 (current)
- Focal height: 164 metres (538 ft)
- Lens: Type OR 500; Focal length: 250 mm
- Intensity: main: AL 1000 W reserve: LABI 100 W
- Range: main: 22 nautical miles (41 km; 25 mi) reserve: 18 nautical miles (33 km; 21 mi)
- Characteristic: Fl (2) W 15s.
- Italy no.: 2398 E.F.

Punta Imperatore Lighthouse (Italian: Faro di Punta Imperatore) is an active lighthouse located atop an impressive overhanging promontory in the westernmost point of Ischia, Campania on the Tyrrhenian Sea. The lighthouse serves Naples as sighting approach.

== Description ==
The first lighthouse was built in 1884 and the current was activated in 1916; it consists of a 2-storey masonry white keeper's house with the tower, 13 metres (43 ft) high, attached to the sea side with balcony and lantern. The lantern, painted in white and the dome in grey metallic, is positioned at 164 metres (538 ft) above sea level and emits two white flashes in a 15 seconds period, visible up to a distance of 22 nautical miles (41 km; 25 mi). The lighthouse is completely automated and operated by the Marina Militare with the identification code number 2398 E.F. The lighthouse for many years was managed by Lucia Capuano, widow of the lighthouse keeper who died in service on November 25, 1937, who succeed to get her husband's job and become a keeper herself.

== See also ==
- List of lighthouses in Italy
- Ischia
