= San Giacomo della Spada, Alcamo =

Church building in Alcamo, Italy

Chiesa di San Giacomo della Spada
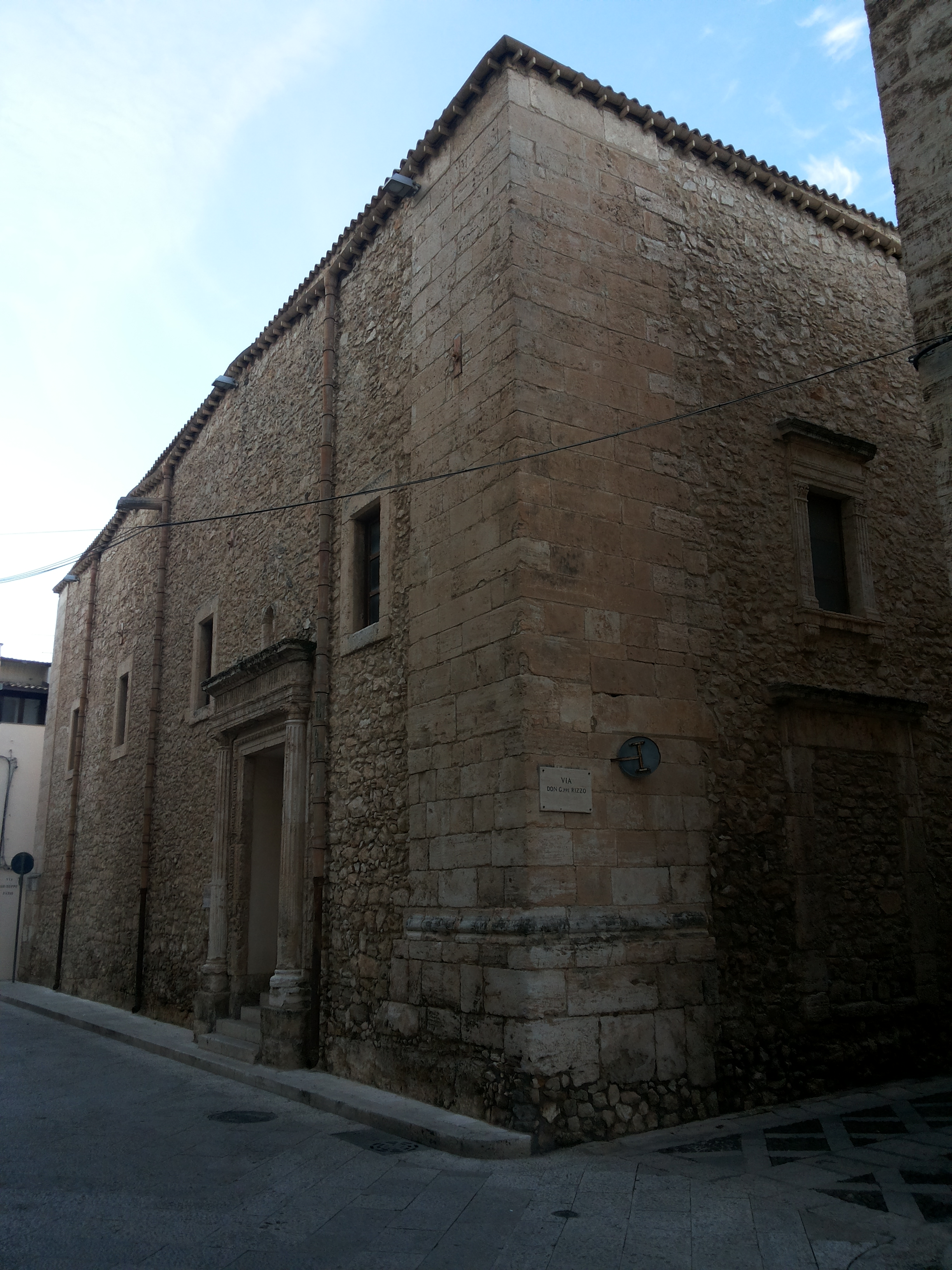
- The façade

Religion
- Affiliation: Roman Catholic
- Province: province of Trapani
- Region: Sicily
- Rite: Catholic
- Patron: Saint James of the Sword

Location
- Location: Alcamo, province of Trapani, Italy
- Municipality: Alcamo
- State: Italy
- Interactive map of Chiesa di San Giacomo della Spada
- Territory: Alcamo
- Coordinates: 37°58′48″N 12°57′59″E

San Giacomo della Spada ('Saint James of the Sword') is a Catholic church in Alcamo, in the province of Trapani, adjoining it there was the Hospice of Pilgrims.

== Historical hints ==
The church rose as a chapel dedicated to the Saint who gave the name to one of the most ancient quarters in Alcamo; it is mentioned in two notarial deeds dating back to 1380 and in a document of the Episcopal Curia in 1435.

The church was built before 1529 and reconstructed in 1571 and in 1596, then widened between the years 1625–36. From the architectonic point of view, it is beautiful: there was an altar with a painting of Saint James and some pilgrims on the way to the Sanctuary of Compostela; on the sides of the altar there were placed two statues of Saint James and Saint Andrew.

After the 1866 laws on the suppression of religious corporations, the church was confiscated and given to the town municipality, which used it as a civic library from 1875 to 1968 . As of June 2018, after the last restoration work, it is the seat of the Ethnographic Museum of Musical Instruments "Gaspare Cannone".

== The confraternity ==
Since 1569 it hosted a Confraternity of Saint James of the Pilgrims, with the scope of assisting pilgrims, and the Confraternity of Saint Christopher, founded 40 years before, joined it; both of them had the running of a hospice for pilgrims which had to be founded.

The two confraternities had the privilege of Fiera franca, that is any tax exemption during the period of the feast, so the money saved, together with that one saved in the following years, was to be used for the assistance of pilgrims and the building of a hospice. As the periods were coincident for both congregations, this provoked a quarrel between them and a fusion of the two institutions in one confraternity, later elevated to a company in 1619.

Its brethren had a deep blue sackcloth, with mantles and hats, and they wore a red cross as emblem and a cane on their hands, like pilgrims. After the change to a company occurred in 1619 (as affirms the historian Ignazio de Blasi), they probably wore "a sackcloth and white visors, with the emblem of the cross ending like a sword, the characteristic insignia of the glorious Saint James, on the shoulders".

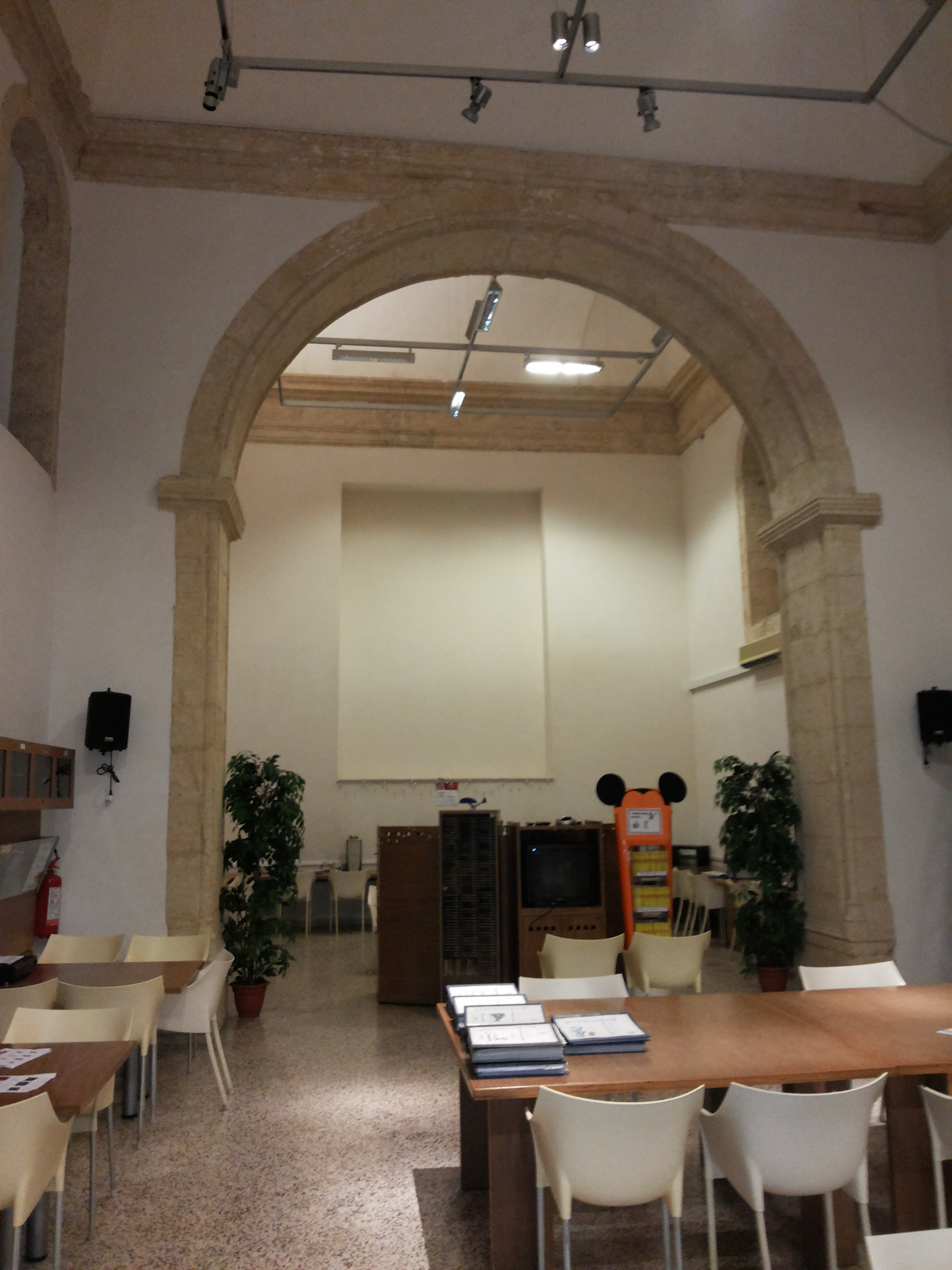
The Interior today

In 1642 they were renewed the privilege of Fiera franca and built a hostel for pilgrims next to the church, working from 1649 to 1746, which they had not yet completed in 1649. These hostels were located in the town centres and carried out different activities, assisting poor or sick people, widows, orphans and foundlings, much more when the number of pilgrims on long distances decreased a lot.

By 1749 the company no longer ran the hostel and probably it had been dissolved before. The Congregation of Charity, which administered its finances, as they did not host pilgrims going to the Holy Land or to the various sanctuaries, assigned those financial returns to the poorhouse (Ricovero di Mendicità) which had to be founded using the patrimony inherited from the De Blasi Mangione.

== Sources ==
- Carlo Cataldo: Guida storico-artistica dei beni culturali di Alcamo-Calatafimi-Castellammare Golfo p. 36; Sarograf, Alcamo, 1982
- Carlo Cataldo: La conchiglia di S.Giacomo p. 89-90; Campo, Alcamo, 2001
- Regina Vincenzo: Cavalieri ospedalieri e pellegrini per le antiche vie della provincia di Trapani; 2002, Cavalieri ospedalieri e pellegrini per le antiche vie della provincia di Trapani / Vincenzo Regina
