= Forio =

- Comune
- Comune di Forio
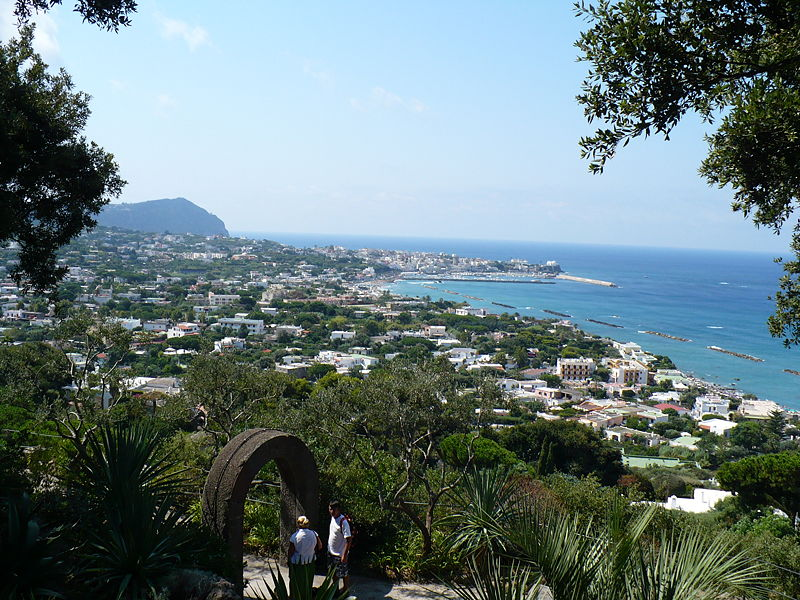
- View of Forio

- Flag Coat of arms

- Location within Italy Location within Campania
- Coordinates: 40°44′15.6″N 13°51′26.9″E
- Country: Italy
- Region: Campania
- Metropolitan city: Naples (NA)
- Frazioni: Panza

Government
  - Mayor: Francesco Del Deo

Area
  - Total: 13.08 km^{2} (5.05 sq mi)
- Elevation: 16 m (52 ft)

Population (2026)
  - Total: 17,464
  - Density: 1,335/km^{2} (3,458/sq mi)
- Demonym(s): Foriani, Panzesi
- Time zone: UTC+1 (CET)
  - Summer (DST): UTC+2 (CEST)
- Postal code: 80075
- Dialing code: 081
- Patron saint: Saints Vitus and Leonard
- Saint day: June 15, November 6
- Website: Official website

Forio (known also as Forio of Ischia) is a town and comune (municipality) in the Metropolitan City of Naples in the region of Campania in southern Italy, situated on the island of Ischia. It has 17,464 inhabitants.

Its territory includes the town of Panza, the only frazione of Forio and of the island of Ischia. Panza has always been an independent village since the 16th century when a first governmental organization was introduced on the island. In the 1975 the inhabitants of Panza tried to become an independent comune but the referendum, claimed by the inhabitants of Forio, was denied by the Campania's Regional Government.

== Demographics ==
As of 2026, the population is 17,464, of which 49.9% are male, and 50.1% are female. Minors make up 15.7% of the population, and seniors make up 20.9%.

Historical population

Year	Pop.	±%
1861	5,997	—
1871	6,458	+7.7%
1881	6,791	+5.2%
1901	7,197	+6.0%
1911	7,130	−0.9%
1921	8,105	+13.7%
1931	7,197	−11.2%
1936	6,415	−10.9%

Year	Pop.	±%
1951	6,603	+2.9%
1961	7,209	+9.2%
1971	8,142	+12.9%
1981	9,642	+18.4%
1991	11,526	+19.5%
2001	14,554	+26.3%
2011	16,597	+14.0%
2021	17,456	+5.2%

Source: ISTAT

=== Immigration ===
As of 2025, immigrants make up 11.9% of the population. The 5 largest foreign countries of birth are Romania, Ukraine, the Dominican Republic, Germany, and Senegal.

== Sights ==
There are numerous coastal watchtowers, built from the Middle Ages against Saracen and African pirates raids.

== In popular culture ==
In the 20th century, Ischia inspired at least two well-known English language poets. Ischia was the site where W.H. Auden composed one of his most famous poems, In Praise of Limestone. And the American Poet, Theodore Roethke, dedicated his poem The Storm, to "Forio d'Ischia" as printed in Selected Poems of Theodore Rothke (Library of America, Edwin Hirsch, Ed., 2005, p. 113).

== Twin towns - sister cities ==
- Brusson, Italy
- Polignano a Mare, Italy
