= Citara =

Beach on the Ischia island of Italy

Coordinates: 40°43′02″N 13°51′41″E

Citara (Italian: Spiaggia di Citara) is a beach located in Forio d'Ischia, in the Ischia island of Italy, near Punta Imperatore and the village of Panza. Its name comes from Romans who consecrated the site to Venus Citarea, whose statue made of white marble was found in the area. An old legend has it that the rocks, which can be seen from the beach, were in origin sailors transformed into stones as a punishment for passing through. The reference is from Odysseus, in which it is told that “Feaci” (the people living at “Scheria”, a place in the Tyrrhenian area which has been identified with Ischia) provided Ulysses with a boat to get home, so the goddess Venus punished them for helping him. On Citara Beach the Poseidon Thermal Garden is provided with a series of sea and thermal water swimming pools. It is known for its sun catching position and limpid sea. Spring water gushes into the sea.

== Poseidon Thermal Garden and resorts ==
The attraction of this Thermal Park in the setting of the bay of Citara in Forio in Ischia is unique and fascinating. The thermal springs that feed the baths at the Giardini Poseidon are considered curative, due to their volcanic origins. The therapeutic effect is based both on the richness and variety of mineral salts, and on the beneficial effect of the high temperature of these waters. 22 swimming pools (thermal, Kneipp, ocean-water) have been installed using recent technical and medical knowledge. The water temperature varies from 28 to 40 °C (82 to 104 °F), and the abundance of water means that it is constantly renewed. A Roman sauna, a large private beach are equipped with deck-chairs and beach umbrellas, and various restaurants of which one is situated in a beautiful grotto of local tuff-stones and a boutique with a newspaper kiosk, complete this establishment.
