= Takita =

Takita (written: 滝田 or 田北) is a Japanese surname. Notable people with the surname include:

- Yōjirō Takita (滝田 洋二郎) (born 1955), Japanese film director
- Yuki Takita (田北 雄気) (born 1967), Japanese footballer
