= Panza =

- Frazione
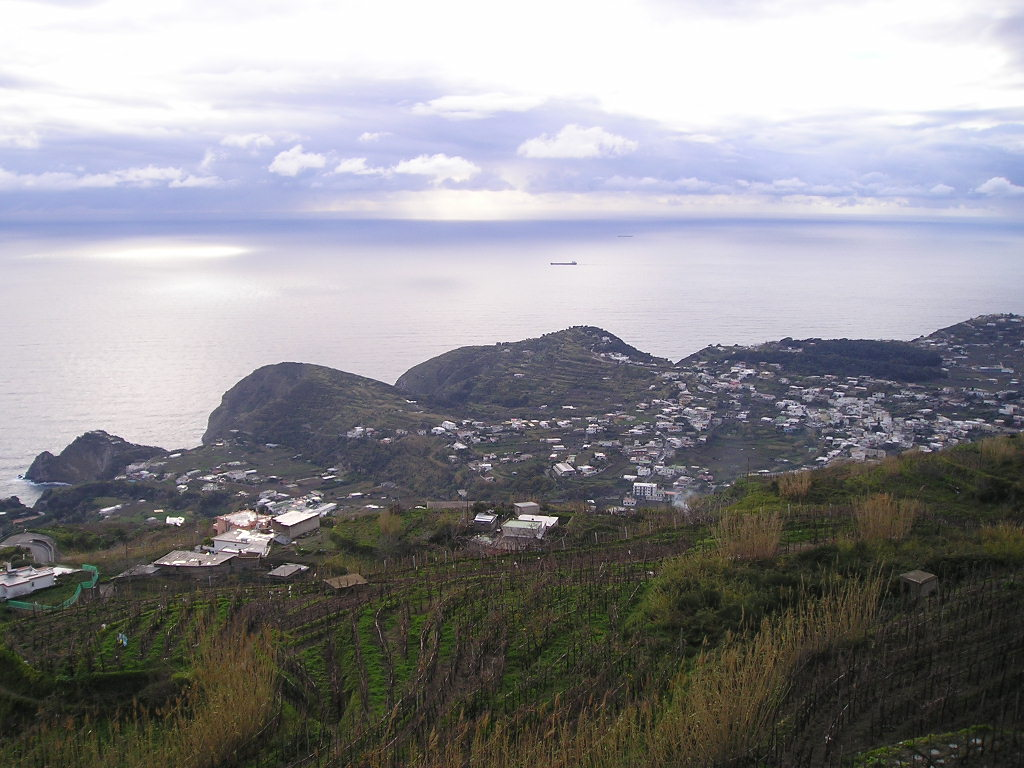
- A view of Panza from the Mount Epomeo.

- Location of Panza in Italy
- Coordinates: 40°42′N 13°52′E
- Country: Italy
- Region: Campania
- Province: Naples (NA)
- Comune: Forio

Area
  - Total: 7 km^{2} (2.7 sq mi)
- Elevation: 25 m (82 ft)

Population (July 2010)
  - Total: 7,000
  - Density: 1,000/km^{2} (2,600/sq mi)
- Demonym: Panzesi
- Time zone: UTC+1 (CET)
  - Summer (DST): UTC+2 (CEST)
- Postal code: 80075
- Dialing code: 081
- Patron saint: Saint Leonard
- Saint day: 6 November

Panza (sometimes Panza d'Ischia) is a small town of 7,000 inhabitants on the island of Ischia, Italy. It is a hamlet (frazione) of the municipality of Forio.

== Name ==
According to archaeological discoveries the place was so named by the first Greek colonists in the 8th century BC astounded by the rich variety of the flora and fauna. They settled and founded a small farm ready to colonize all the island founding the first western Greek colony: Pithecusae.

After the Roman conquest of the Island, the village was named Pansa Vicus, from the Latin verb pandere namely outstretched in the sun. In Neapolitan language the word panza means belly, in a variant of the Italian word pancia.

== Overview ==
The bay, not far from the center of the modern village, is a suggestive places within the island. Set among two promontories, the inlet offers a show of natural wild scenery and, to lines, hostile. The access in the bay is given by an ample staircase that counts 214 steps, but it is possible to also reach Sorgeto by sea.

The bay of Sorgeto is world-famous for its hot mineral springs. Different thermal veins flow in fact along the whole bay, but it is from a single spring that water always gushes out with impetus and in abundance. The temperature of the water reaches 90 °C and mixes itself with the salty water of the sea so to create natural tubs of different temperature gradations.

In the 16th century a Calabrian physician, G. Jasolino, first examined the thermo-mineral waters that according to Jasolino had varied curative effects:beneficial to the gouts, to the frigidity and the sterility.

== Citara ==
One of the most interesting areas is the bay of Citara with its famous thermal gardens Poseidon.

22 pools (Thermal, Kneipp, and ocean-water) have been installed according to latest technical and medical knowledge. The water temperature varies from 28 to 40 °C (82 to 104 °F) ). The abundance of water means that it is constantly renewed. A Roman Sauna and a large private beach is equipped with deck-chairs and beach umbrellas, various restaurants one situated in a grotto of local tuff stones and a boutique with a newspaper kiosk are provided by this establishment.

== Transportation ==
A permanent bus service is linked with all important parts of the island.
