= Leonard of Noblac =

Frankish saint

Saint Leonard of Noblac
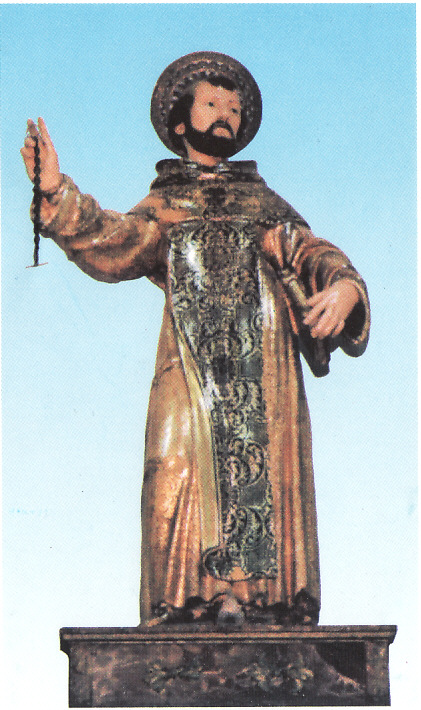
- Wooden statue of Saint Leonard

Abbot of Noblac, hermit
- Died: 559
- Venerated in: Catholic Church; Eastern Orthodox Church; Anglican Church
- Feast: 6 November
- Attributes: Depicted as an abbot holding chains, fetters or locks, or manacles
- Patronage: Political prisoners, imprisoned people, prisoners of war, and captives, women in labour, horses

Leonard of Noblac (also Leonard of Limoges or Leonard of Noblet; also known as Lienard, Linhart, Lenart, Leonhard, Léonard, Leonardo, Annard; died 559) is a Frankish saint closely associated with the town and abbey of Saint-Léonard-de-Noblat, in Haute-Vienne, in the Limousin region of France. He was converted to Christianity along with the king, at Christmas 496. Leonard became a hermit in the forest of Limousin, where he gathered a number of followers. Leonard or Lienard became one of the most venerated saints of the late Middle Ages. His intercession was credited with miracles for the release of prisoners, women in labour and the diseases of cattle.

Leonard of Noblac (also Leonard of Limoges or Leonard of Noblet; also known as Lienard, Linhart, Lenart, Leonhard, Léonard, Leonardo, Annard; died 559) is a Frankish saint closely associated with the town and abbey of Saint-Léonard-de-Noblat, in Haute-Vienne, in the Limousin region of France. He was converted to Christianity along with the king, at Christmas 496. Leonard became a hermit in the forest of Limousin, where he gathered a number of followers. Leonard or Lienard became one of the most venerated saints of the late Middle Ages. His intercession was credited with miracles for the release of prisoners, women in labour and the diseases of cattle.

== Traditional biography ==
According to the romance that accrued to his name, recorded in an 11th-century vita, Leonard was a Frankish noble in the court of Clovis I, founder of the Merovingian dynasty. Saint Remigius, Bishop of Reims was his godfather. As a disciple of Remigius, he was granted the prerogative to visit prisons and free anyone held there.

Leonard secured the release of a number of prisoners, for whom he has become a patron saint, then, declining the offer of a bishopric— a prerogative of Merovingian nobles— he entered the monastery at Micy near Orléans.

== Diffusion of cult ==
Although there is no previous mention of Leonard either in literature, liturgy or in church dedications, in the 12th century his cult rapidly spread, at first through Frankish lands, following the release of Bohemond I of Antioch in 1103 from a Danishmend prison, which he attributed to the intercession of St. Leonard. Bohemond, a charismatic leader of the First Crusade, subsequently visited the Abbey of Noblac, where he made an offering in gratitude for his release. Bishop Walram of Naumburg, who was present during Bohemond's visit, wrote up a new life of Leonard, including posthumous miracles like Bohemond's. Bohemond's example inspired many similar gifts, enabling the construction of the Romanesque church and its prominent landmark belltower. About the same time Noblac was becoming a stage on the pilgrimage route that led to Santiago de Compostela.

Leonard or Lienard became one of the most venerated saints of the late Middle Ages. His intercession was credited with miracles for the release of prisoners, women in labour and the diseases of cattle. His feast day is 6 November, when he is honoured with a festival at Bad Tölz, Bavaria. He is honoured by the parish of Kirkop, Malta, on the third Sunday of every September.

== Veneration ==
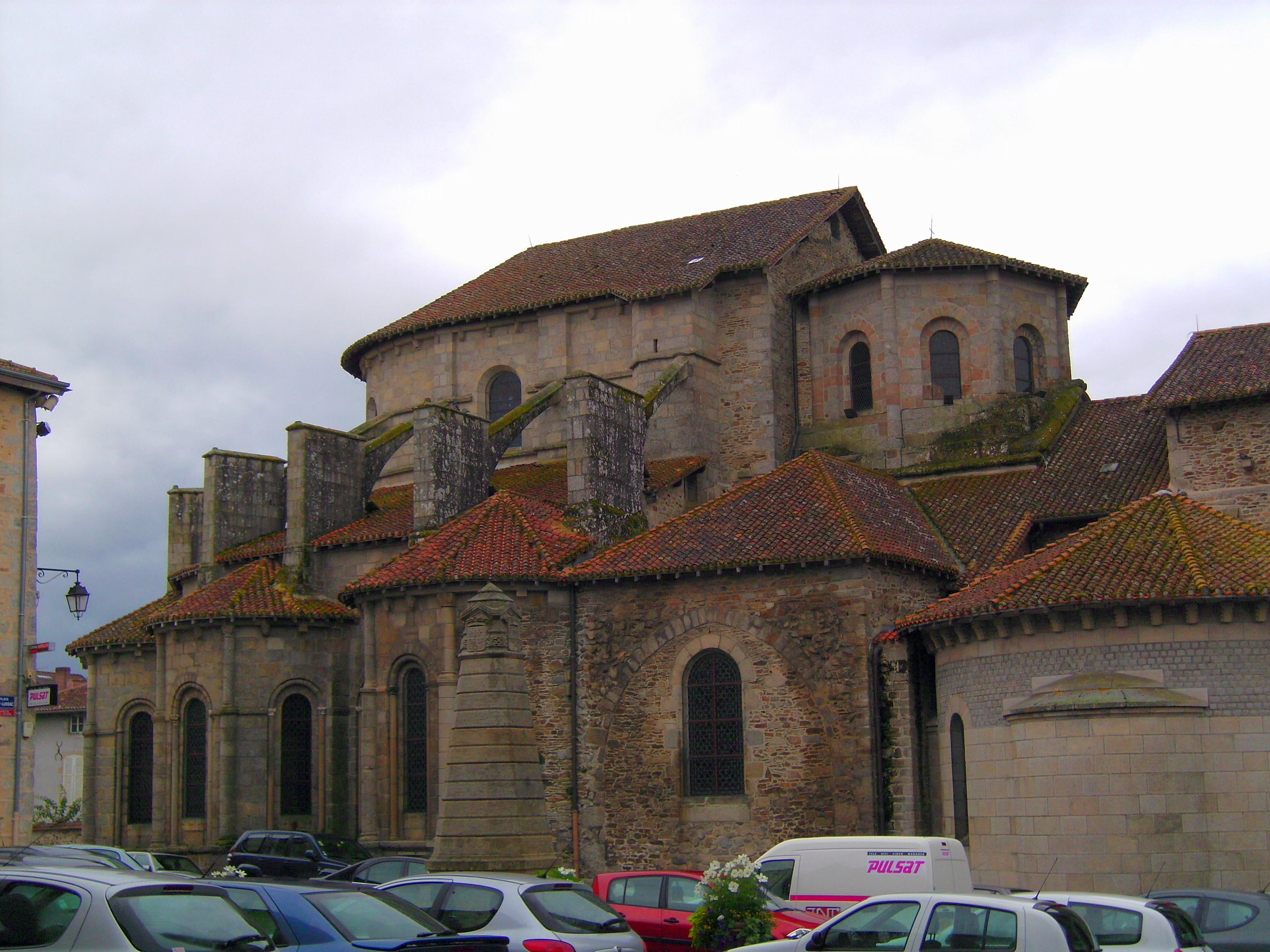
The Romanesque church of St Leonard in Saint-Léonard-de-Noblat, Haute-Vienne, France

Arms attributed to Saint Leonard

In the Alpine regions of Bavaria, St Leonard is regarded as the traditional patron of farmers. Many Bavarian communities carry out traditional processions or rides on his feast day; community members wear traditional costume, usually dirndls for the women and Lederhosen for the men. Until the Secularisation, Inchenhofen became a major pilgrimage site for the cult of St Leonard, promoted by the Cistercian monks of nearby Fürstenfeld Abbey.

Leonard is remembered in the Church of England with a commemoration on 6 November.

== Notable dedications ==
Various places refer to this saint. Notable among these is the town of St Leonards-on-Sea in East Sussex, England. Sussex is also home to St Leonard's Forest. This part of England has a significant number of dedications to St Leonard. Some of the best-known are the parish church of St Leonard in Hythe, Kent, with its famous ossuary and St. Leonard's, Shoreditch in London. There is a cluster of dedications in the West Midlands region, including the original parish churches of Bridgnorth (now a redundant church and used for community purposes) and Bilston, as well as White Ladies Priory, a ruined Augustinian house. The largest hospital in northern mediaeval England was an Augustinian foundation dedicated to St. Leonard, in York; its partial ruins are to be found in the Museum Gardens although undercroft remains lie some hundred yards away and are used as a bar under the York Theatre Royal. In Newton Abbot, Devon, there is both a chapel of ease dedicated to St Leonard, first recorded in 1350, and a replacement church built in 1834. The chapel was near the bridewell (prison). There is also a church dedicated to St Leonard in Wallingford, Oxfordshire; the church is Saxon in origin but it was heavily rebuilt in 1849 in the Victorian gothic revival style by architect Henry Hakewill. Clewer, Berkshire is the site of St Leonard's House (formerly Sophia Lodge) & now the headquarters of Legoland Windsor, being formerly the HQ of Billy Smart's Windsor Safari Park.

Several German churches are dedicated to the saint, including St. Leonhard, Frankfurt.

In Italy almost 225 places are dedicated to the saint, equally distributed in the North (in Friuli, there is the oldest Italian church dedicated to this saint, 774) as well as in the South where the shrine was introduced by the Normans. The shrine can be found even in Italian islands such as Sicily, Sardinia, Ischia, Procida. In September 2004, a national meeting of the Italian parish churches dedicated to the Saint took place in the small village of Panza d'Ischia where a small chapel of St. Leonard was transformed into a church in 1536.

The Mediterranean nation of Malta contains a single parish dedicated to this saint, in the town of Kirkop; the parish church was founded on 29 May 1592. The saint is known as San Anard Abbati in Maltese.

In Portugal the parish and church (late 12th century) of Atouguia da Baleia (Peniche) is dedicated to St Leonard. The saint's day is commemorated every 6 November (or the closest Sunday). This is the only parish dedicated to St Leonard in the country.

== Gallery ==
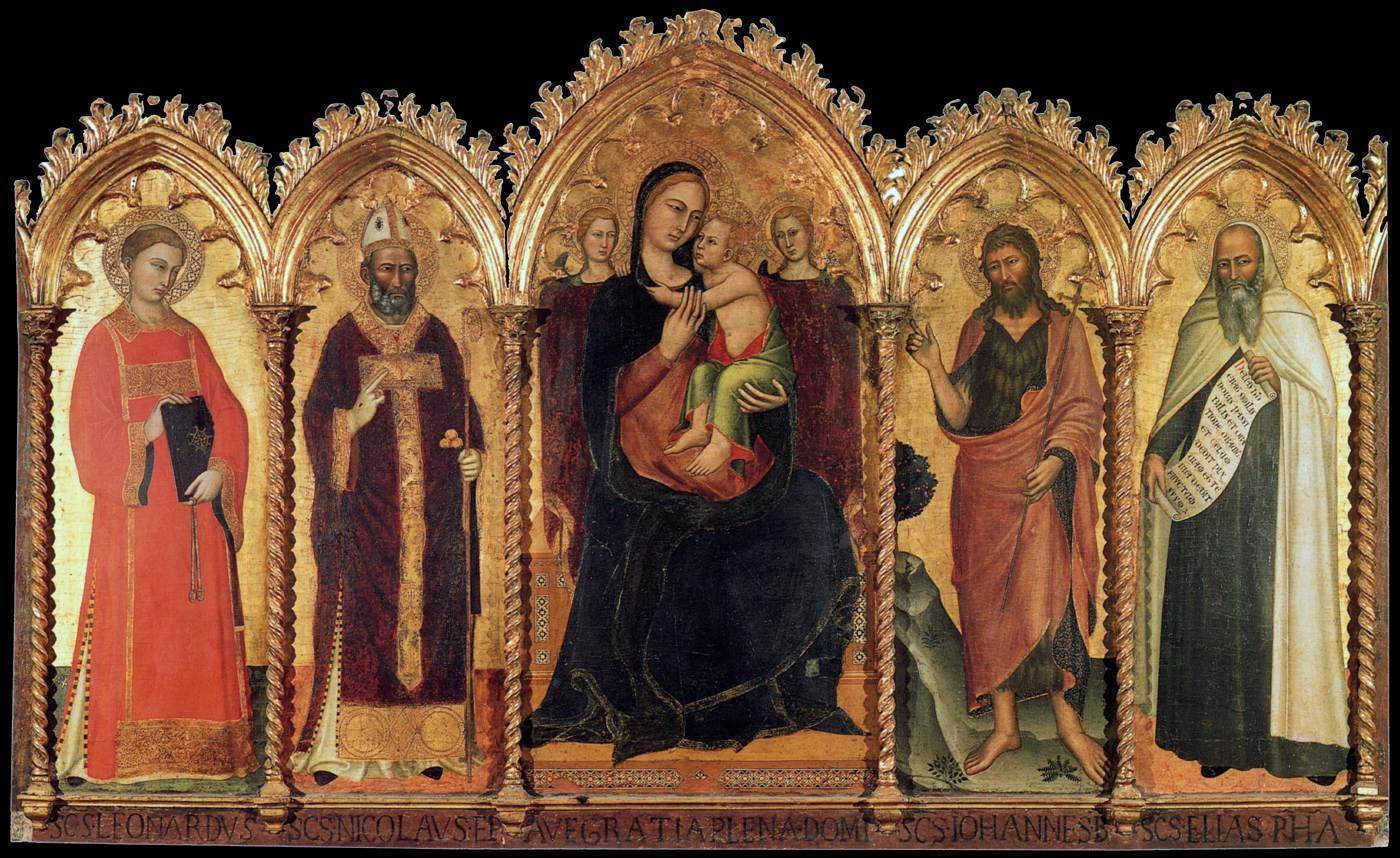
Andrea di Bonaiuto. Madonna and Child with Saints Santa Maria del Carmine, Florence 1360-62 (2)

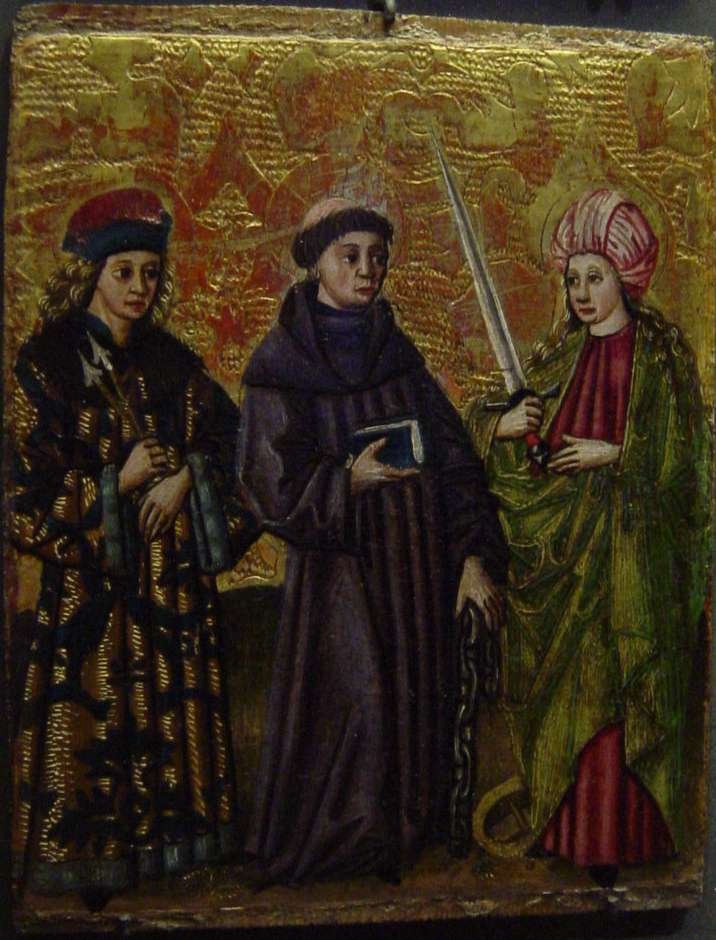
15th-century painting of St Sebastian, St Leonard and St Catherine

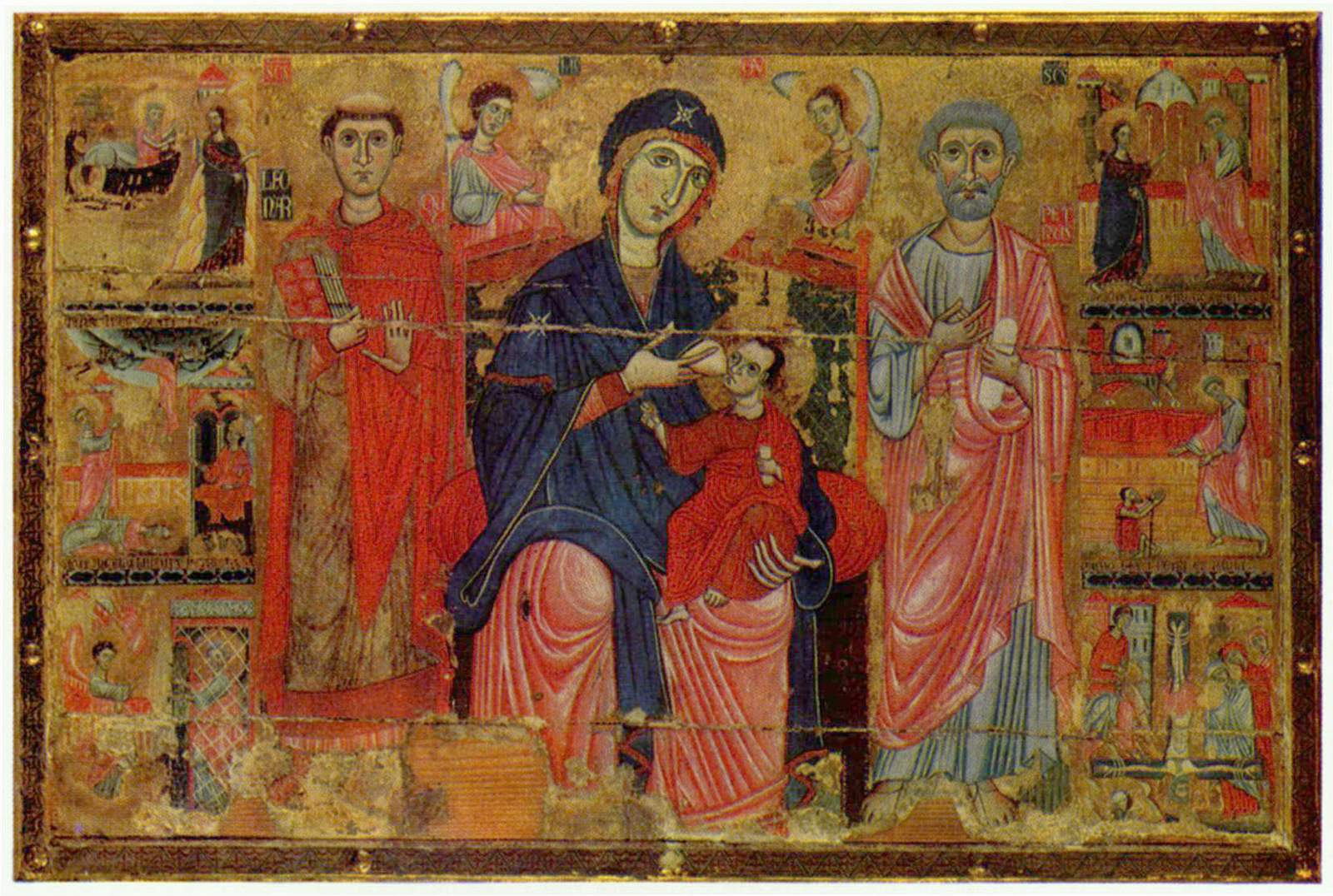
St Peter and St. Leonard (Linhart)

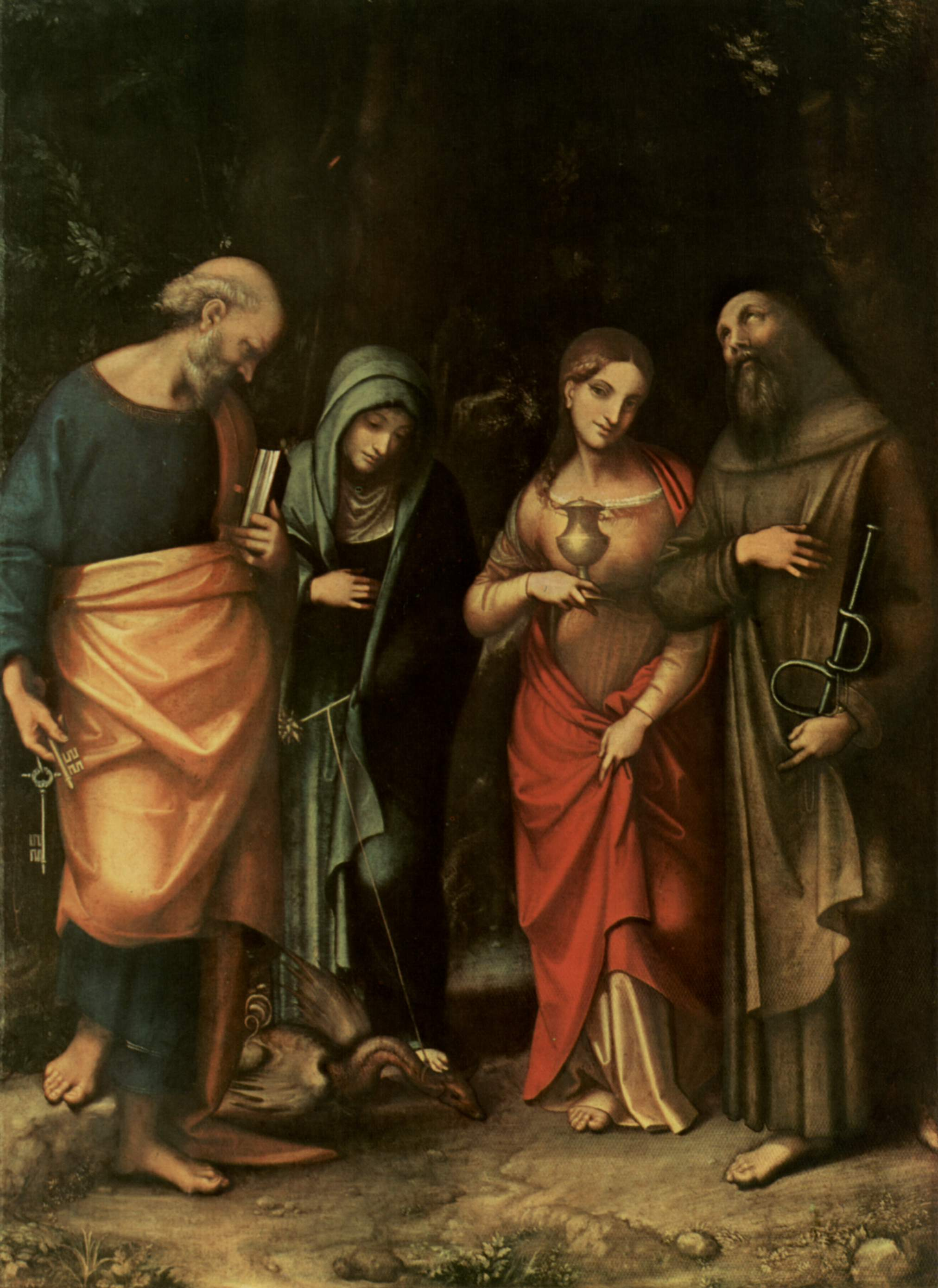
Saint Peter, Saint Martha, Saint Mary Magdalene, and Saint Leonard, by Correggio

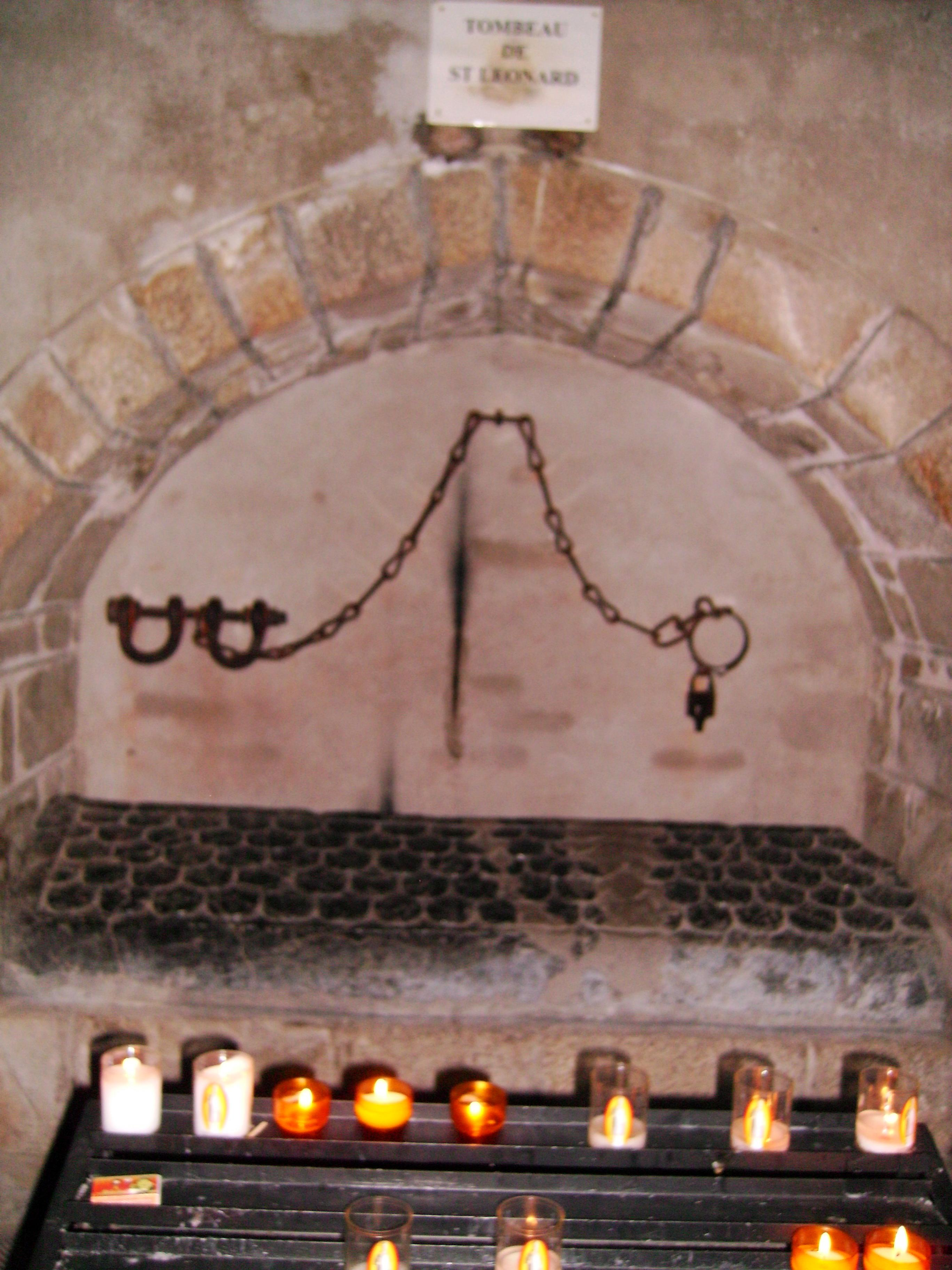
Tomb of St Leonard at Saint-Léonard-de-Noblat, Haute-Vienne

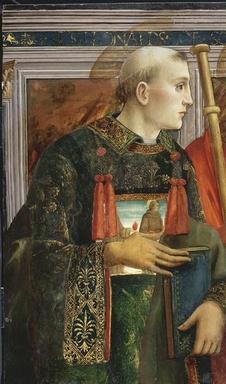
"Saint Léonard et saint Jacques"

== See also ==
- St Leonard's Church (disambiguation)
- Saint Leonard (disambiguation)
- St Leonards (disambiguation)
- Saint Leonard of Noblac, patron saint archive
