= A Dialogue Concerning Witches and Witchcrafts =

1593 book by George Gifford

A Dialogue Concerning Witches and Witchcrafts was a book written by George Gifford and published in 1593. It "is notable for its attention to the ministerial challenges posed by witch belief as well as for its entertaining dialogue designed to appeal to a wide audience".

Gifford told the story of many alleged witches, including Feats, a reputed sorcerer in Elizabethan London, whose familiar spirit was a black dog named Bomelius.
