= Monte Polizzo =

Archaeological site in Sicily, Italy

Coordinates: 37°51′52″N 12°47′18″E

Monte Polizzo (today Mount Polizo) is an archaeological site located 6 km northwest of the town of Salemi, in the province of Trapani, western Sicily, southern Italy. It occupies an easily defended hilltop, from which a vast area of western Sicily can be seen, and consists of an interconnected group of ridges, the highest point of which is 725.9-metre-high (2,382 ft) above sea level. The settlement has been dated to c. 9th - 4th centuries BC.

The Monte Polizzo Project is a group of international scholars who are interested in the ancient Elymians of western Sicily, and their Early Iron Age origins, development and eventual collapse. It also aims to investigate the process of Hellenisation and the influence of Phoenician and Greek occupations of western Sicily during the archaic period.

== History ==
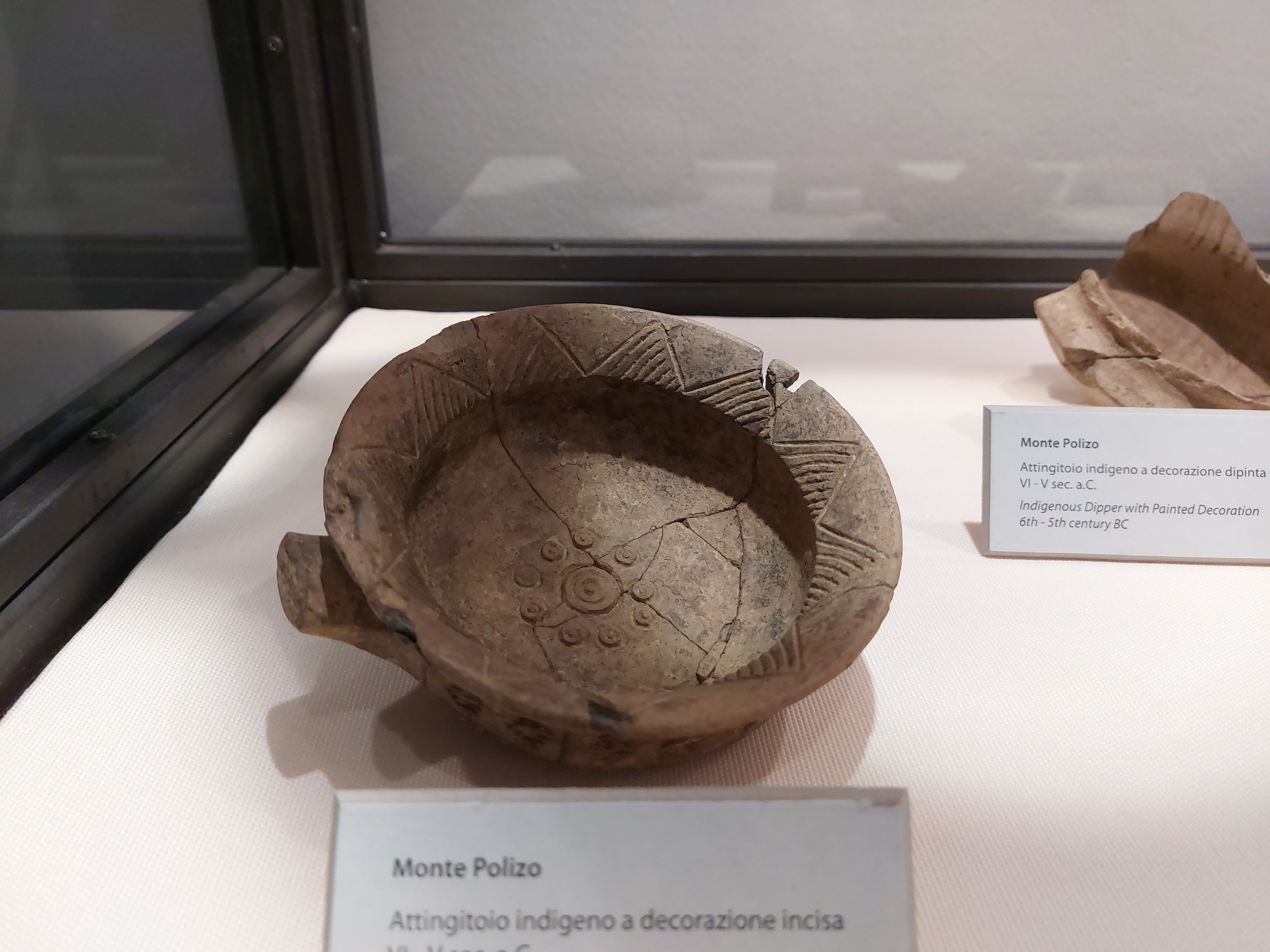
Indigenous Dipper with Incised Decoration (6th-5th century BC)

In 1970, Vincenzo Tusa launched a campaign of trial excavations in inland western Sicily, including the first organized dig at Monte Polizzo. He opened several trial trenches, uncovering Iron Age remains, associated with 6th century BC Greek pottery.

In 1996, Vincenzo Tusa's son Sebastiano (Superintendent of Prehistoric Archaeology for the Trapani province and Professor of Archaeology at the University of Naples) created an international project to further understanding of the Elymians, with Monte Polizzo at its core. In 1998, the Sicilian-Scandinavian Archaeological Project was launched, led by Sebastiano Tusa and Kristian Kristiansen (Professor of Archaeology at the University of Gothenburg in Sweden).

From 1998 to 2001, Christopher Prescott of the University of Oslo directed the excavation of House 1, dated c. 550-525 BC, as well as the town dump and areas on the north slope of the acropolis. Excavations were extended to the west in 2002 by Christian Mühlenbock and Kristian Kristiansen from the University of Gothenburg. The new area revealed additional house complexes from the mid-6th century BC. The excavations were drawn to a close in 2006 but the results will soon be published in two major volumes.

An archaeological survey of the surrounding area was undertaken by Michael Kolb of Northern Illinois University beginning in 1998 and revealed a rich settlement system dating from the Copper Age to the medieval period, many of the sites being reoccupied over time. Kolb has also excavated at nearing Salemi, recovering finds that document the presence of residual 6th century BC activity and 4th–3rd century BC settlement, lending credence to the idea that Salemi is the ancient city of Halyciae of the Elymians.

In 1999, Stanford University joined the Monte Polizzo project, where a team of students led by Michael Shanks and Emma Blake began analyzing finds from the 1998 excavations. In 2000, Professor Ian Morris (Professor of Classics and Professor of History at Stanford University) began excavating on the acropolis with students and volunteers from around the world. By 2002, the acropolis excavation had become one of the largest archaeological projects in the western Mediterranean.

Excavations on the acropolis were drawn to a close during the 2006 season, although analysis of the backlog of artifacts continues. Annual preliminary reports in English are published in Memoirs of the American Academy in Rome, and in Italian in Sicilia Archaeologica.

== Bibliography ==
- Ian Morris; Trinity Jackman; Brien Garnand; et al. (2004). "Stanford University Excavations on the Acropolis of Monte Polizzo, Sicily, IV: Preliminary Report on the 2003 Season". Memoirs of the American Academy in Rome. 49: 197. doi:10.2307/4238823. ISSN 0065-6801. JSTOR 4238823. Wikidata Q57073472.
