= Giulia Adamo =

Italian politician (born 1949)

President of the Province of Trapani
- In office 25 May 1998 – 22 December 2005
- Preceded by: Carmelo Spitaleri
- Succeeded by: Antonio D'Alì

Member of the Sicilian Regional Assembly
- In office 29 June 2006 – 29 October 2012

Mayor of Marsala
- In office 22 May 2012 – 18 July 2014

Personal details
- Born: 18 May 1949 (age 77) Marsala, Province of Trapani, Italy
- Party: Independent politician

Giulia Adamo (born 18 May 1949) is an Italian politician, who served as president of the Province of Trapani from 1998 to 2005, and as mayor of Marsala between 2012 and 2014.

== Biography ==
=== Early years ===
Giulia Adamo had a classical education before moving on to the Faculty of History and Philosophy at the University of Palermo, where she studied at the Jesuit "Pedro Arrupe Institute", and from which she emerged with a degree. She married the distinguished physician-surgeon Giuseppe Spanò who died young. However, before that happened the marriage produced two daughters, Virginia and Eugenia. She embarked on a teaching career and then, in a competitive process, was promoted to the rank of head teacher. She worked first at the "Scuola Media Statale Alcide De Gasperi" (state school) and later at the "A. Damiani Technical Institute of Agriculture" in Marsala.

=== Politics ===
In 1993 Adamo became an Education Assessor ("Assessore alla Pubblica Istruzione"), working for the centre-left regional government in Marsala, under the direction of the mayor ("sindaco") - and ex-football referee) Salvatore Lombardo. In 1998 and again in 2003 Adamo was elected president of the Province of Trapani in western Sicily. She achieved a wide coalition of support on the Provincial Council despite (or because of) not herself being a member of any political party at this stage. Two years later, however, in 2005, she joined the recently launched centre-right Forza Italia.

Her Provincial Council mandate was due to expire in 2008, but in December 2005 she resigned early in order to be able to compete as a Forza Italia list candidate in the forthcoming elections for the Sicilian Regional Assembly. In the regional elections of May 2006 she secured election with a convincing vote level. She became president of the assembly commission for Environment and Land. In 2008 Adamo was re-elected, again with a solid vote level, this time representing the newly emerging "Il Popolo della Libertà" (PDL / "The People of Freedom") party. However, in a development which generated a certain amount of derision on the part of commentators, and following an apparently last minute strategic change of heart by her political colleague and successor as provincial president in Trapani, Antonio D'Alì, she failed to win nomination from her own regional council and was therefore suspended from the party (which was itself dissolved a few years later).

Adamo now approached Gianfranco Miccichè, a Sicilian politician with a ministerial record in Italian national governments. They discussed creating a political alliance with the express objective of protecting the interests of Sicily in the face of the political lines pursued by the PDL and Lega Nord parties with their roots in the Italian centre and north. Adamo became president of the "PDL Sicilia" group within the Regional Assembly, which comprised followers of the leading national politician Gianfranco Fini and other former members of Forza Italia close to Miccichè. However, following the dissolution of this "PDL Sicilia" group in September 2010 Adamo declined to follow Miccichè and his supporters into the new (and short-lived) Great South ("Grande Sud" party), following differences over support for the regional government chaired by Raffaele Lombardo.

On 14 October 2010 she joined the recently configured Union of the Centre (UdC), becoming president of the party's group in the Assembly and co-coordinator for the party, with Gianni Pompeo, the mayor of Castelvetrano, in Trapani. In 2011 she became regional party president.

On 21 May 2012 Giulia Adamo was elected Sindaco (Mayor) of Marsala. Her rival candidate was Salvatore Ombra. From the first round of the election she narrowly failed to win more than 50% of the votes, but in the second round, in which only the top two candidates from the first round were eligible to stand, she obtained nearly 66% of the votes. On 22 August 2012 she resigned her seat in the Sicilian Regional Assembly in order to be able to devote herself fully to her role as mayor. The Marsala council which she led was supported by the UdC, the Democratic Party (DP), the so-called "Crocetta List" and various other local group.

On 18 December 2013 Adamo resigned her membership of the UdC, explaining that when she had joined it three years earlier she had been excited and exhilarated by the party's renewal project for Sicily, but that in the absence of any follow-through she felt that her membership of it was simply serving to constrain her freedom to act as she thought best in respect of her political responsibilities to the voters of Marsala.

In 2014 Adamo lost her appeal in respect of her criminal conviction. A criminal investigation had been launched nearly a decade earlier, but the prosecutor's hand had been greatly strengthened by the so-called Severino Laws of 2012. Adamo was now debarred from holding public office for a term of eighteen months, which meant suspension from her mayoral duties on 19 July 2014. She reacted by resigning the office permanently on 23 July 2014.

== Judicial matters ==
Giulia Adamo was indicted for extortion on 30 June 2006. The indictment alleged that she had exerted pressure on the directors of a boarding school ("Convitto per audiofonolesi") in Marsala, in order to have the rector replaced with a different individual, named by her. After the usual hearings, appeals and delays she secured an acquittal from the Court of Appeal in Palermo. However, on 26 January 2012 the Supreme Court of Cassation in Rome annulled the Palermo decision and sent the matter back for retrial.

In 2010 Adamo was condemned by the Rome-based Court of Audit which required her to pay back a total amount of at least 385,000 Euros to four different institutions with which, as president of the Trapani, she had had dealings since 2000. The payments in question had been identified as consultancy fees, but the definition was one that the court rejected. Reports reflect an opinion on the part of the court and commentators that even by the standards of the time and place the amounts involved were large. Some of the stronger descriptions applied in connection with the court judgment included "inescusabile leggerezza e negligenza" (loosely, "inexcusable casual negligence") and "il vero e proprio dolo" (loosely, "the real unadulterated fraudulence").

On 14 January 2014 reports emerged of an investigation launched by the public prosecutor in Palermo into suspicions involving 500,000 Euros of public money allegedly diverted for private use. The investigation was reportedly launched in 2012 and concerned the so-called "ARS coalition" group of deputies among whom Adamo was a leading figure in the Sicilian Regional Assembly during the political upheavals of 2010. Adamo's first response when asked about a jewel which she had purchased (it was said) while on holiday in Brazil during 2011 was a question: "Ma quando mai?" ("But when?"). On receiving a persuasive answer on that point, she agreed that she had purchased the item, but explained she had purchased the jewel to have it set in a cup to be gifted to the son of Nino Strano, another important and respected Sicilian politician. In short the jewel was purchased in order to be part of a wedding present. The prosecutor's office naturally asked both Nino Strano and his son for confirmation of this explanation. It turned out that neither man could remember having received the gift, even though there had not been so many (wedding presents): "... E regali non ne abbiamo ricevuto tanti".

On 16 July 2014 the "Prima Sezione" of the Palermo Appeal Court sentenced Giulia Adamo to a prison term of two years and ten months on the charge of attempted extortion. There was also a five year ban on holding public office. A couple of days later, in an application of the recently enacted Severino Laws, Adamo was suspended from her mayoral duties for eighteen months. She resigned the office permanently a week or so later. On 6 May 2015 the Court of Cassation "definitively acquitted" Adamo, which meant cancellation of the prison sentence which had been imposed for attempted extortion on 16 July 2014. The ban on holding public office seems also to have been implicitly rescinded.

On 16 November 2015 Adamo was acquitted on charges involving disrespecting a public official ("oltraggio a pubblico ufficiale") - a relatively recent addition to the Italian schedule of indictable crimes. The court also acquitted her co-accused, Gregorio Saladino. The case arose out of a complaint from a traffic policemen who testified that had asked the two of them to move a scooter which they had parked in the Via Garibaldi in front of the old market building. Their reaction was to recommend that he might wish to perform his duties in another part of the town. The traffic policeman alleged that Giulia Adamo, in concert with her companion, a municipal councillor called Gregorio Saladino, had reacted towards him in a verbally threatening manner. Luigi Cassata, Adamo's defence lawyer, was able to reassure the court that his client had not offended anyone. Whatever she might have said to the good officer was intended simply to restore the excellent performance and efficiency of administrative duties in respect of traffic policing. The defence lawyer representing Gregorio Saladina was a man called Sebastiano Genna, whose arguments were not dissimilar in character. He also pointed out that there had been plenty of other scooters parked in the same place at the same time. Judge Sara Quittino, sitting alone, was evidently persuaded.

On 12 July 2016 an indictment was issued against eleven deputies or former deputies, including Giulia Adamo, by Riccardo Ricciardi, a Palermo plenary court judge ("Giudice dell'udienza preliminare"). The indictment concerned embezzlement allegations involving expenses claims submitted by members of the Regional Assembly. In June 2017 it was reported that the Court of Cassation had rejected some of the embezzlement allegations included in the indictment. That meant that five of those named had been acquitted of all the embezzlement charges alleged. For six others, although some of the charges against them had been investigated and found insufficiently persuasive, there were other embezzlement charges that were still listed on what survived of Judge Ricciardi's original indictment. Giuilia Adamo was one of the six Regional Assembly deputies or former deputies for whom charges remained on the indictment.
