= Triscina di Selinunte =

- Hamlet
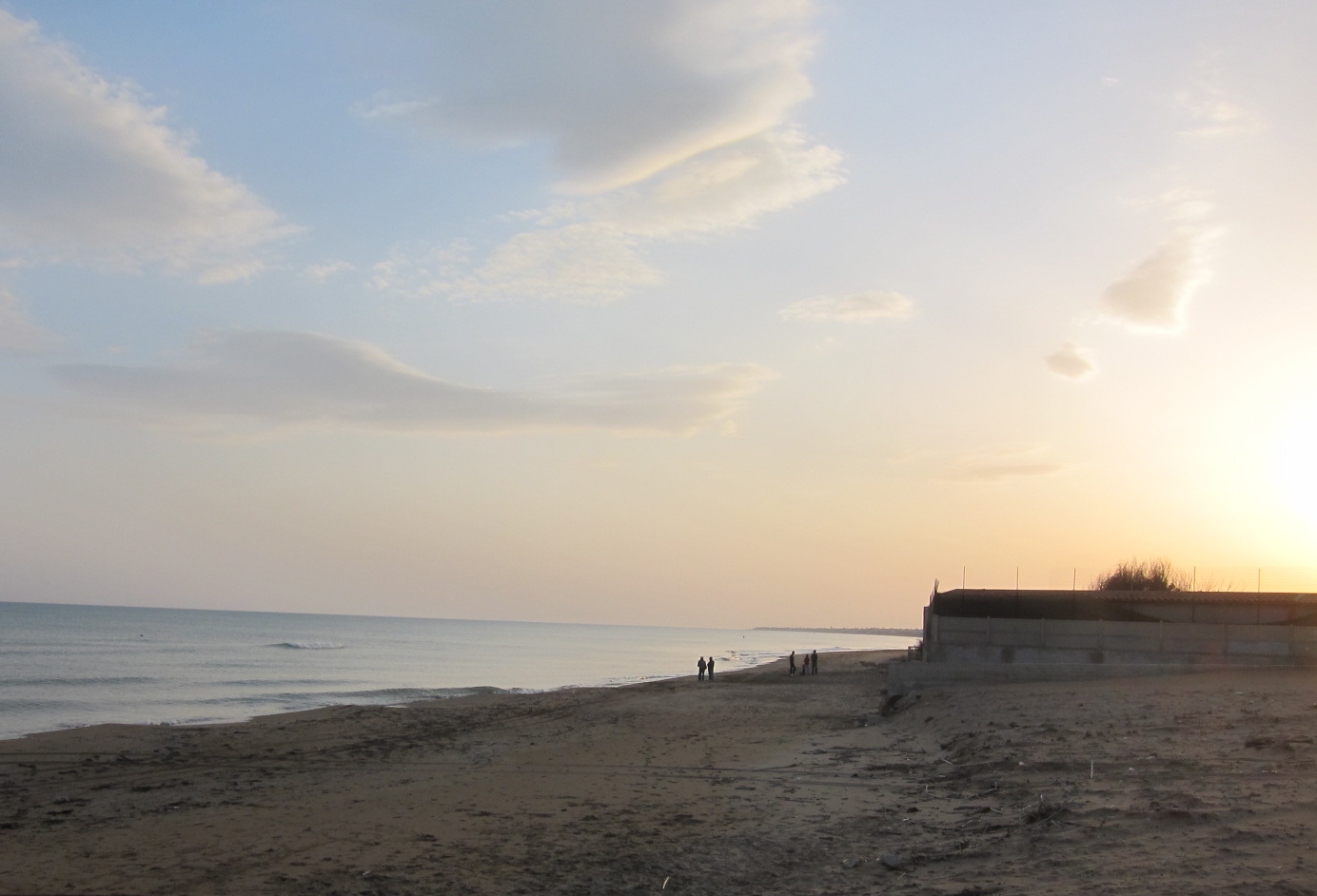
- Sunset at Triscina
- Interactive map of Triscina di Selinunte
- Coordinates: 37°35′07″N 12°47′23″E
- Country: Italy
- Region: Sicily
- Province: Trapani (TP)
- Comune: Castelvetrano

Trìscina, also known as Trìscina di Selinunte, is a hamlet of Castelvetrano, Italian town in the province of Trapani, in Sicily. It counts 645 residents.

== Geography ==
Together with Marinella di Selinunte it is one of the two sea hamlets of Castelvetrano. It is about 2 km away from the archeological area of Selinunte, the ancient Greek town. It borders with Selinunte to the east and with Tre Fontane (Campobello di Mazara) to the west.

Trìscina has long sandy beaches and shallow water sea.

== History ==
The hamlet was born and developed from the second half of the 20th century, through the abusive construction of houses, without any urbanistic plan.

For this reason, Triscina is often cited as an example of unauthorized development, sometimes together with Marinella.

In the last decade, this phenomenon was stopped and several houses have been demolished since 2018 to restore the coast.

== Transportation ==
Trìscina is connected to Castelvetrano and Marinella di Selinunte via bus.
