= Marausa =

- Frazione
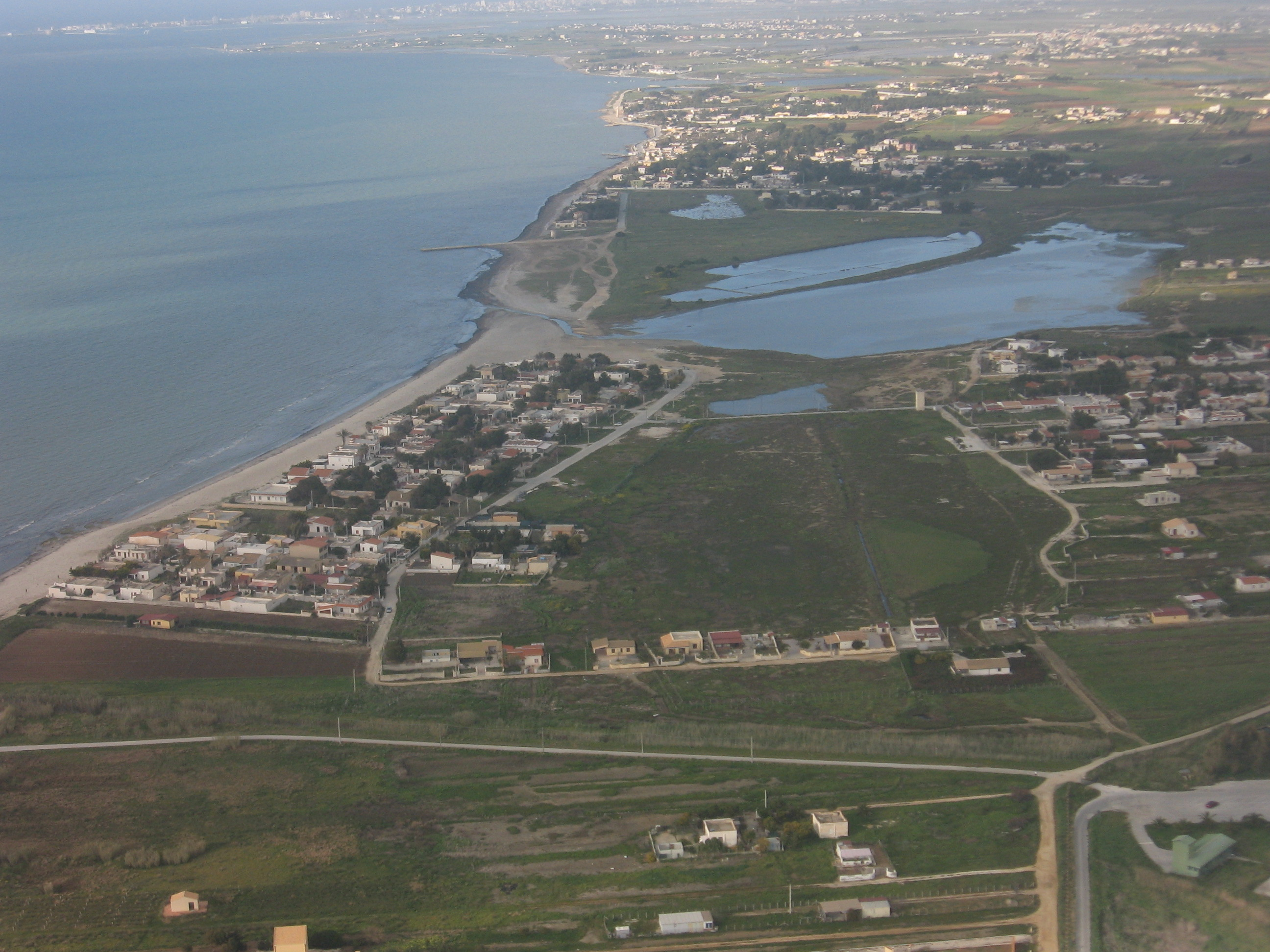
- Marausa and its beach from above

- Location of Marausa in Italy
- Coordinates: 38°1′0″N 12°31′0″E
- Country: Italy
- Region: Sicily
- Province: Province of Trapani
- Comune: Misiliscemi
- Elevation: 23 m (75 ft)

Population
  - Total: 1,028
- Demonym: Marausoti
- Time zone: UTC+1 (CET)
  - Summer (DST): UTC+2 (CEST)
- Postal code: 91100
- Dialing code: 0923
- Patron saint: Immaculate Conception

Marausa is a frazione of the comune of Misiliscemi. Before the creation of the comune, Marisa was part of the city of Trapani. It is located on the coastal road to Trapani airport, 8.7 km from the city of Trapani.

== History ==
The name seems to derive from the Arabic “Mara u zack." The "Torre di Mezzo" (Tower of the Middle), one of the coastal towers of Sicily, dates to the end of the 16th century and was in active use for military purposes from 1619 until last century.

Marausa is one of the region's major summer destinations, known for the natural beauty of the location and for its beach (the Lido Marausa) which looks out on the Aegadian Islands. The southern edge of the frazione is formed by the mouth of the natural course of the river Birgi.

On the seabed, 150 metres off shore and a few metres below the surface, a Roman ship was discovered in 1999.

== Transport ==
Marausa is linked by a junction to the Autostrada A29. There is also a train station, which links the frazione to Trapani and Palermo. Trapani airport is a few kilometres away.
