= Marinella di Selinunte =

- Frazione
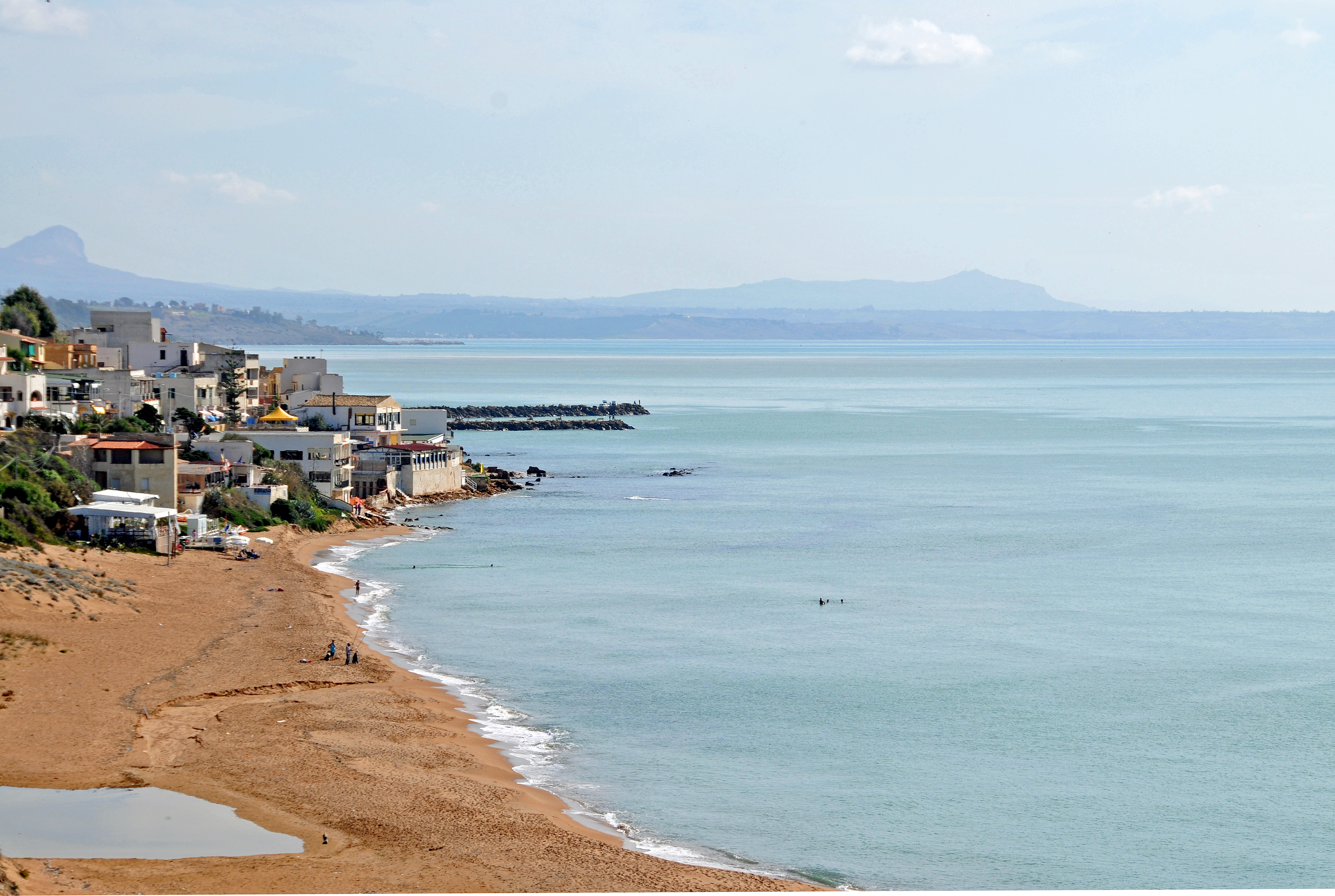

- Location of Marinella di Selinunte in Italy
- Coordinates: 37°34′57″N 12°50′22″E
- Country: Italy
- Region: Sicily
- Province: Trapani (TP)
- Comune: Castelvetrano
- Elevation: 2 m (6.6 ft)

Population (2011)
  - Total: 1,499
- Demonym: Marinellesi / Selinuntini
- Time zone: UTC+1 (CET)
  - Summer (DST): UTC+2 (CEST)
- Postal code: 91022
- Dialing code: (+39) 0924
- Website: Official website

Marinella di Selinunte, also known as Marinella, is a southern Italian village and hamlet (frazione) of Castelvetrano, a municipality in the Province of Trapani, Sicily. It is located close to the Ancient Greek city of Selinunte and, in 2011, it had a population of 1,499.

== History ==
The village was founded at the end of the 19th century and grew, due to its position by the coast, during the second half of the 20th century. Today it is a tourist and seaside resort. Fishing is practiced, the fish market is held every day at 8 o'clock.

== Geography ==
Marinella is located by the Mediterranean Coast, 13 km south of Castelvetrano and next to the archaeological site of Selinunte. It is few km from Triscina, the other hamlet of Castelvetrano, 14 from Campobello di Mazara, 17 from Menfi and 30 from Mazara del Vallo. The railway station of Selinunte, part of the former Castelvetrano-Sciacca-Porto Empedocle-Agrigento railway, is located in the village.

== Main sights ==
Marinella is located near the archaeological area of Selinunte an ancient Greek city founded in 650 BC. Other places to visit are the Foce del Fiume Belice Nature Reserve and the Church of Sacro Cuore di Maria.

== Gallery ==
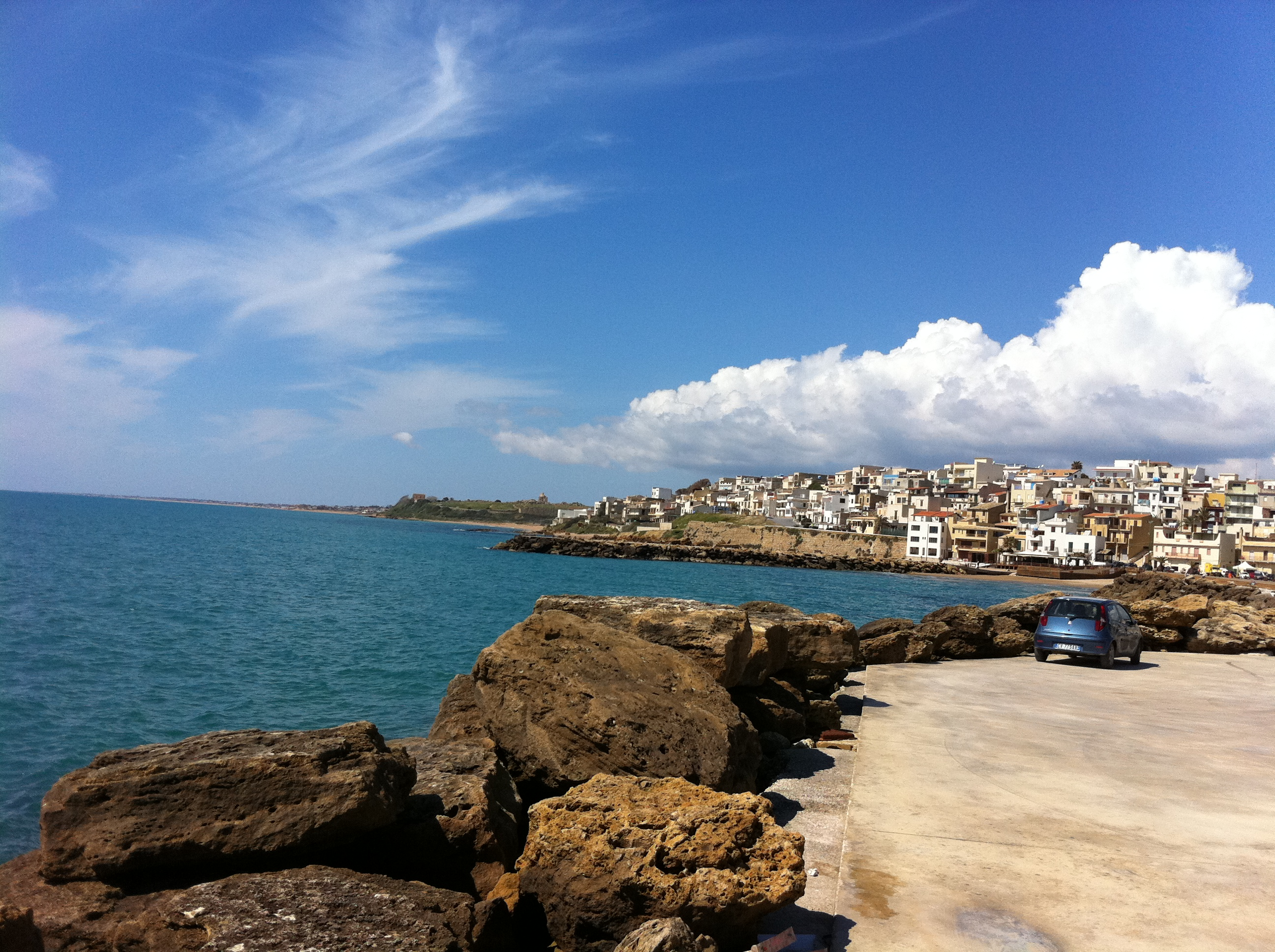
Panoramic view

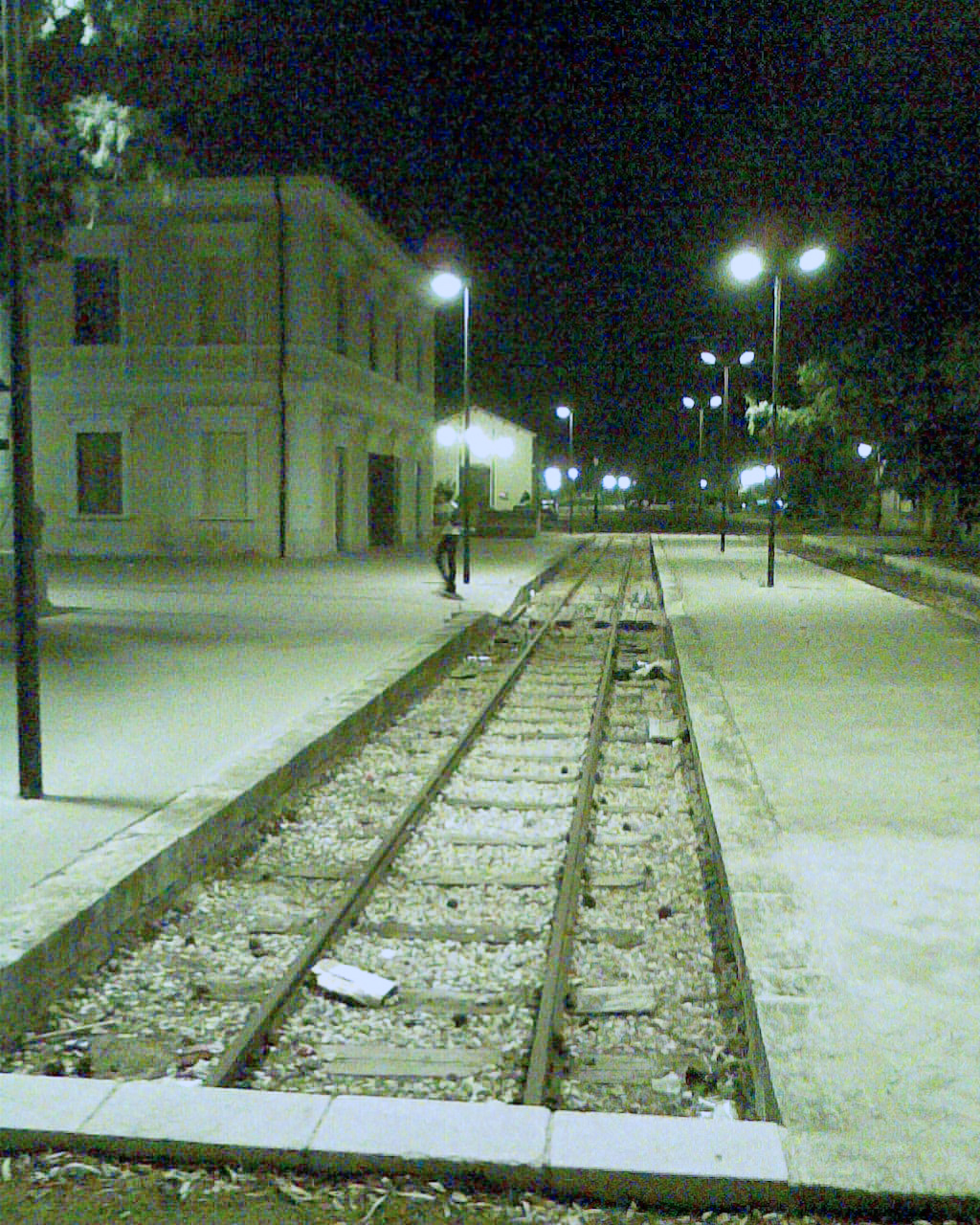
The preserved Selinunte train station in 2008

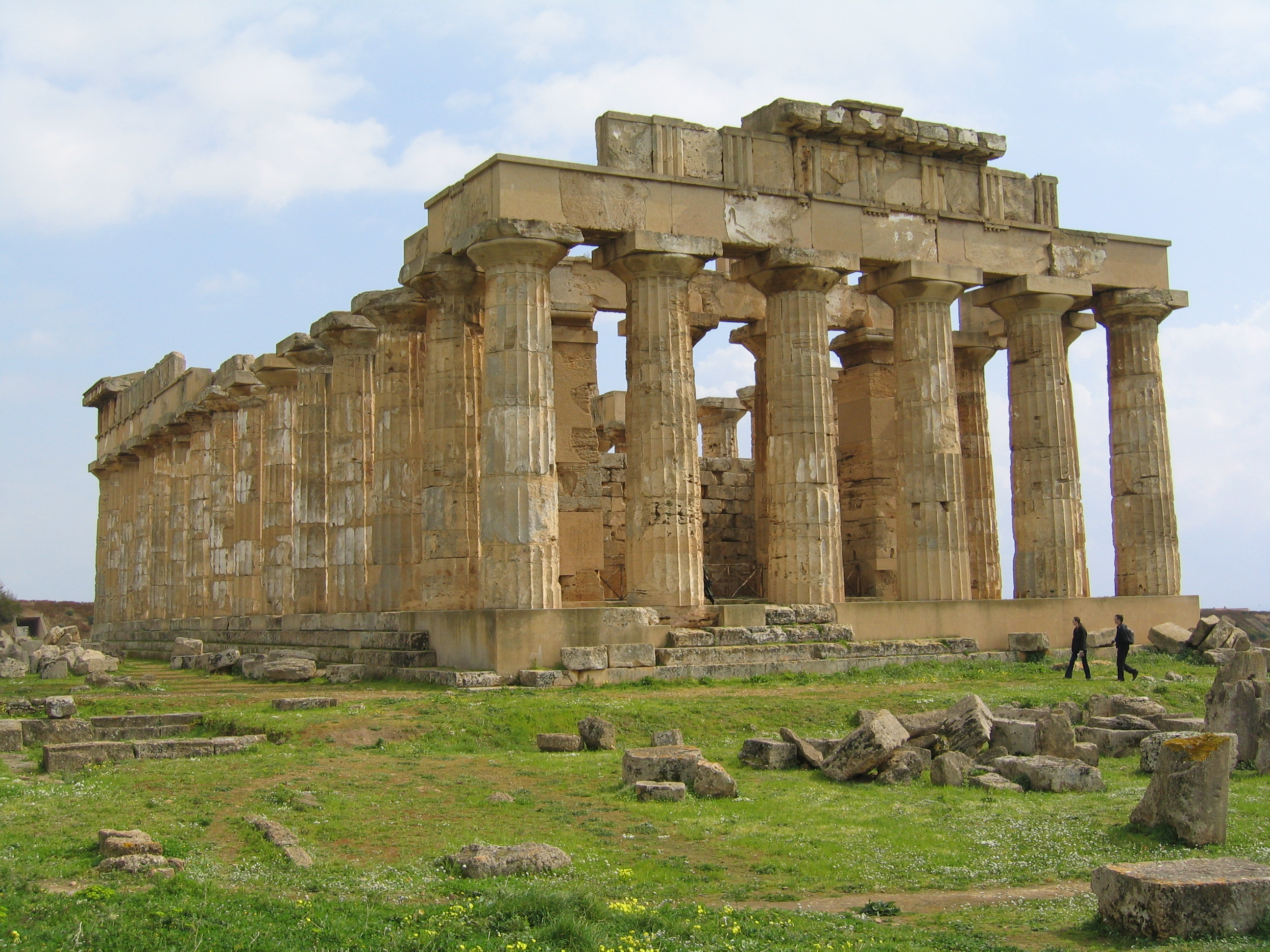
Temple of Hera
