= Girolamo Turano =

Italian politician (born 1965)

Regional assessor for Education of Sicily
- Incumbent
- Assumed office 10 November 2022
- President: Renato Schifani
- Preceded by: Alessandro Aricò

Regional assessor for Productive Activities of Sicily
- In office 29 November 2017 – 10 November 2022
- President: Nello Musumeci
- Preceded by: Maria Lo Bello
- Succeeded by: Edi Tamajo

President of the Province of Trapani
- In office 20 June 2008 – 31 August 2012
- Preceded by: Antonio D'Alì
- Succeeded by: Office abolished

Regional assessor for Local Government and Social Policies of Sicily
- In office 26 July 2000 – 25 June 2001
- President: Vincenzo Leanza
- Preceded by: Salvino Barbagallo
- Succeeded by: Antonio D'Aquino

Member of the Sicilian Regional Assembly
- Incumbent
- Assumed office 5 December 2012
- In office June 1996 – 15 April 2008

Personal details
- Born: 17 October 1965 (age 60) Alcamo, Sicily, Italy
- Party: Lega (since 2022); Union of the Centre (1996–2022)
- Education: University of Palermo
- Profession: Lawyer

Girolamo "Mimmo" Turano (born 17 October 1965) is an Italian politician who has served as regional assessor for Education of Sicily since November 2022. He previously served as regional assessor for Productive Activities (2017–2022), president of the Province of Trapani (2008–2012), and regional assessor for Local Government and Social Policies (2000–2001). He has been a member of the Sicilian Regional Assembly since 1996, with a break between 2008 and 2012.

== Life and career ==
Turano was born in Alcamo, Sicily, in 1965. He graduated in law from the University of Palermo and worked as a lawyer.

A member of the Union of the Centre (UDC), he was first elected to the Sicilian Regional Assembly in 1996 and was subsequently re-elected in 2001 and 2006. During his first three terms he served in several executive positions, including regional assessor for Local Government and Social Policies.

In 2008, Turano was elected president of the Province of Trapani, leading a centre-right coalition. He resigned in August 2012 to contest the Sicilian regional elections, in which he was re-elected to the Regional Assembly for the UDC. In November 2017, he was appointed assessor for Productive Activities by president Nello Musumeci.

In 2022, Turano left the UDC and joined the Lega. He was re-elected to the Regional Assembly in the 2022 regional election with 7,125 preference votes and was appointed assessor for Education by president Renato Schifani on 10 November 2022.

At the 2024 European Parliament election, Turano was a Lega candidate in the Insular Italy constituency. He received 18,619 preference votes but was not elected.
