= Salemi =

Salemi, Sicily
- Comune
- Comune di Salemi, Sicily
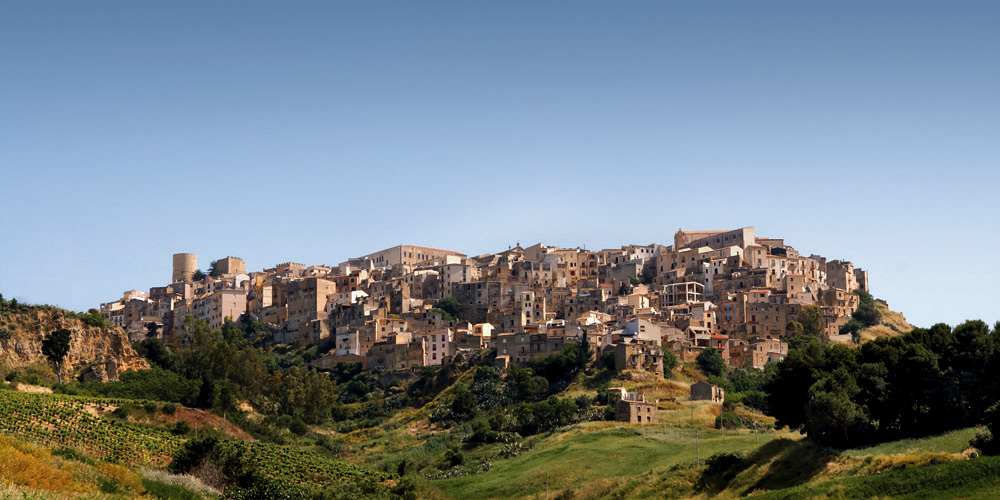

- Coat of arms

- Location within Italy Location within Sicily
- Coordinates: 37°49′N 12°48′E
- Country: Italy
- Region: Sicily
- Province: Trapani (TP)
- Frazioni: Sinagia, Filci, Gorgazzo, San Ciro Fontana Bianca, San Ciro Petrazzi, Ulmi

Government
  - Mayor: Domenico Venuti

Area
  - Total: 182.42 km^{2} (70.43 sq mi)
- Elevation: 446 m (1,463 ft)

Population (28 February 2017)
  - Total: 10,971
  - Density: 60.141/km^{2} (155.77/sq mi)
- Demonym: Salemitani
- Time zone: UTC+1 (CET)
  - Summer (DST): UTC+2 (CEST)
- Postal code: 91018
- Dialing code: 0924
- Patron saint: Saint Nicholas
- Saint day: December 6
- Website: Official website

Salemi is a town and comune in northwestern Sicily, Italy, administratively part of the province of Trapani. It is one of I Borghi più belli d'Italia ("The most beautiful villages of Italy").

== History ==
Salemi is where Giuseppe Garibaldi announced the annexation of Sicily on May 14, 1860, as part of the Expedition of the Thousand, briefly making the town his headquarters after his landing at Marsala two days earlier.

=== From Alicia to Salemi ===
Located on the slopes of Monte delle Rose Mazzaro between the river and the river Grande, the town is situated on the site of the ancient city Elima of Halyciae. Theatre of the continuous wars between Selinunte and Segesta, Salemi (or rather: Alicia as it was known in these times), probably due to their common origin, has always been allied with Segesta.

In 272 BC, Salemi (then known as Alicia) was conquered by the Romans and declared a free city and free from taxes for its voluntary submission.

In the fifth century, like the rest of Sicily, Salemi fell under the dominion of the Vandals, and then under that of the Goths.

In 535, it was conquered by the Byzantine Belisarius, the general of Justinian.

In 827, Salemi fell under the control of the Arabs, and the area prospered. It was during this time that the name Salemi seems to have originated. In this regard, there are several theories about the origin of the name: one theory is attributed in honor of "Saleiman", son of the commander who conquered Alicia, that resulting from "rooms" for the presence of the salty river which makes the brackish waters that run through the city; another theory is that Salemi is derived from the meaning of "Salam" and that is a healthy and safe city, and "Salem", which means peace. The urban center was structured then, and remains in the same configuration today. In terms of agriculture, the Arabs introduced many new crops to Salemi and the surrounding areas: oranges, lemons, peaches, apricots, asparagus, artichokes, cotton, eggplant and spices such as saffron, cloves and cinnamon.

In 1077, and then in later Norman times, the town experienced a remarkable development. During this period, the castle was built.

In 1194, it came under the domination of the Swabians.

In 1266, the death of Frederick II, began the Angevin period, which reduced the amount of the population in poverty.

In 1296, Frederick III of Aragon had Salemi downgraded to a feudal city.

In 1392, Salemi became an independent municipality.

In 1441, on December 11, in the castle of Salemi a confederation made up of Salemi, Trapani, Mazara, Monte San Giuliano and by the barons of Castelvetrano and Partanna was formed which undertook the defense, and bore the costs, of the Queen White and Royal House of Aragon. Salemi was, therefore, more fortified and garrisoned during the raids of the Turks.

In 1735, with the coronation of Charles III of Spain as King of Sicily on June 30, the Bourbon rule began.

=== First capital of Italy ===
In 1860, Giuseppe Garibaldi, after landing at Marsala, headed to Salemi, where on May 14, he was welcomed with great enthusiasm by the population. With the help of Baron Joseph Triolo of Sant'Anna di Alcamo, who had joined him with a band of picciotti, he assumed control in the name of Victor Emmanuel II King of Italy. In the Town Hall Square, called the "dictatorship" in celebration of the event, a plaque recalls that on that date Giuseppe Garibaldi arrived in Salemi declaring himself dictator of the Kingdom of the Two Sicilies, "Sicilians! I led a band of warriors flocked to the heroic cry of Sicily, the rest of the battles of Lombardy. We are with you! Seek only the liberation of our land. All together, the work will be easy and short. To arms then!" On that occasion, the Hero of Two Worlds hoisted, by himself, on top of the cylindrical tower of the Norman - Swabian castle of Salemi, the flag proclaiming Salemi the first capital of Italy;, a title it held for one day. Precisely in Salemi was promulgated one of the first laws of the unified nation, thus giving the city the honor of being the first capital of liberated Italy. Salemi, therefore, stands to Turin (where on 17 March 1861 was proclaimed the 'Unification of Italy) as the act of conception to birth.

=== Garibaldi and celebrations ===
In 1982, on the occasion of the celebration in Salemi of the centenary of the death of Garibaldi, the route taken by the general, Italian patriot and leader was represented symbolically and with the participation of Prime Minister Bettino Craxi. On May 11, 2010, the Head of State Giorgio Napolitano visited Salemi, Calatafimi and Marsala on the occasion of the celebrations for the 150th anniversary of Italy.

=== Count of Salemi ===
On December 1, 1889, King Umberto I, as a sign of affection towards his brother Amedeo of Savoy and his second wife Maria Letizia Bonaparte, gave his infant grandson Umberto the title of "Count of Salemi." The younger Umberto, however, died in 1918 without having children and, consequently, the title was not assigned to any descendant.

=== Disaster and earthquake of 1968 ===
The town of Salemi has suffered various natural disasters in the course of its history. In 1270, the area was hit by an epidemic of plague spread by soldiers who were returning from an expedition in Tunisia. Several homes were burned and destroyed to try to eradicate the disease. From this event arose the request made by the people of the town to have their own patron saint: Saint Nicholas of Bari.

In 1542, an invasion of locusts caused serious damage to agricultural crops and a severe famine. Many citizens invoked the intercession of Saint Blaise (see cavadduzzi of San Biagio).

In 1740, a landslide spilled over into the convent of the Franciscan Third Order of the Rose of the mountain as well as the convent of the Capuchin Friars.

In 1968, in the night between January 14 and 15, the city was badly hit by a strong earthquake that destroyed many towns in the Valle del Belice. In the aftermath of the earthquake, land was donated to Salemi Gibellina on which was subsequently built the town of "New Gibellina." Following the earthquake the political authorities of Salemi called upon architects to design and redesign the structure of the municipality, opting for the reconstruction of the town according to a new style (New town). For these reasons, the urban development has led to a shift towards the downstream part of the hill which was called precisely "new country" and now is, with the "Cappuccini", one of the areas and neighborhoods with higher population density.

The old town is characterized by a system diagram Arabic, with clearly articulated dead ends, leading to increasingly segregated courtyards and staircases particularly on steep cliffs. Following the earthquake, the village in the central area, although not completely disrupted, remained abandoned for several years because of limited rebuilding and a choice to decentralize the new town in other districts. Structure, however, maintained the orthogonality of the monumental complex of the Jesuit College and by a dense corollary of patrician houses and numerous churches (over 20).

In an elevated position and strategically dominant stands the Castle, erected or at least altered by Frederick II in the thirteenth century, on the basis of an ancient Greco-Roman fortress later used by the Arabs and Normans, trapezoidal with three towers and two square and a circular plan.

On the site where stood the ancient medieval mother church, dedicated to Our Lady of the Angels and probably built over a mosque and a temple of Venus, in 1615 began the construction of the Cathedral, designed by the architect Mariano Palermo Smiriglio and completed in 1761, at least with regard to the longitudinal body, as from this date their work began to expand the old apse. The 1968 earthquake did not cause the collapse of part of an aisle, the neglect of the civil and ecclesiastical authorities of the time reduced it to an imposing ruin. Partially recovered, with a plan of action of the Portuguese architect Alvaro Siza, now arouse special attraction the remains of the "Madrice" Alicia in front of the square on which stands the castle. During the international conference called Squares of Europe, Squares for Europe the Alicia square was included among the 60 good examples of implementation, planning and urban redevelopment in the world.

== Religion ==
Between the Jewish Quarter of the Giudecca and Salemi's Islamic Rabato, Salemi's architecture reflects its diverse history, with influences from all three major monotheistic religions: Christianity, Judaism, and Islam.

== Traditions and festivals ==
=== Saint Nicholas of Bari ===
Legend has it that to cope with the plague that destroyed Salemi in 1270, the people Salemi began asking the Church for a patron saint. For these reasons, in 1290 the people made a formal request to Pope Nicholas IV, and the Church decided that the inhabitants should choose their protector. So they chose to draw names from a can, containing the name of all the saints, in order to choose the patron saint of Salemi. The first extraction was the name of Saint Nicholas of Bari. Not finding any link, they opted for a second extraction after which he was again Saint Nicholas. The extraction was performed again and "miraculously" confirmed for the third time. In his honor, he devoted himself a fair. It is said, also, that through the intercession of the saint together with Our Lady, Saint Francis in San Biagio and the town of Salemi was saved from cholera that God wanted scagliarvi in the course of 1740. In the central Freedom Square a statue was erected to thank the saint for having protected the city from the earthquake of 1794.

In 1987, on the occasion of the ninth centenary of the transfer of the relics of the saint from Myra (Turkey) in Bari, during a pilgrimage of Salemi in Bari, after S. Mass celebrated by the city's assistant pastor Don Giuseppe Maniscalco on the tomb of Saint Nicholas, patron as a gift to the inhabitants offered a scented oil and a few drops on the marble of the tomb was completely absorbed, stirring devout awe among onlookers. Quell'ampolla is kept in the treasury of the Basilica of Bari as a sign of reverence to the saint who continues to exist after seven centuries after its proclamation as Patron of Salemi.

=== The Feasts of the Loaves and the City ===
The Feast of Saint Joseph is celebrated on March 19. On this occasion, votive altars are set up so-called "dinner" consisting of a wooden frame, covered with leaves of laurel and myrtle, and decked with oranges and lemons small loaves embroidered called "cuddureddi" and handcrafted by the women of the country representing animals, plants and work tools. On this occasion served are their famous desserts of Saint Joseph, the sfinci.

Other votive breads are the "cuddureddi" of St. Anthony Abbot, and the Cavadduzzi of San Biagio. The inhabitants turned to this saint in 1465, to save the crops from locust invasion, and the "cuddureddi" representing the throat.

Other sacred bread are packaged cucciddati Stick and on April 2, the day dedicated to St. Francis of Paola, The Bread of St. Anthony of Padua, the Boards of St. Nicholas of Tolentino, the loaves of St. Elizabeth of Hungary. In addition, "u peri you" Foot Ox packaged with the first meal of the new harvest, the Manuzzi, on the occasion of the commemoration of the dead on November 2, "u Carcocciulu" the artichoke for the Christmas holidays. For these reasons Salemi is called the City of the Loaves. These breads can be seen at the Museum of Bread Ritual site Salemi in G. Cosenza, 26.

The Feast of Saint Nicholas takes place in honor of the city's patron saint, Saint Nicholas of Bari. The feast is celebrated on December 6 although in ancient times was also celebrated on May 9, the date of transfer of the relics of the saint and the last Sunday in May when they were celebrating the sponsorship. On December 8 they celebrate the solemnity of the Immaculate Conception of the Blessed Virgin Mary, celebrated and honored in Salemi as protectress of the city since 1740, the date on which his wooden statue was donated by Don Gioacchino Genco, pastor of Resuttana, the inhabitants to his fellow citizens. On the last Sunday of August is celebrated in the district of the Capuchins Our Lady of Confusion (i.e. the disturbance of grief over the death of his son).

=== The Texture and the Stone Campanedda ===
The typical traditional skills maintained over the years in Salemi include rug weaving at the loom, embroidery, and stonework called "campanedda" where stones derived from the quarries of the area are used for the decoration of houses and carved by local craftsmen.

== Culture ==
=== Libraries ===
The library, named after the philosopher and university professor Salemi Simone Corleo, contains more than 90,000 volumes. It is located in the heart of the historical center, near the church. In 2008 the art critic Philippe Daverio became librarian.

=== Schools ===
The Liceo Statale Francis of Aguirre is the Institute for the Classical Education, Technical and Vocational located in the district of Salemi. It is named after the illustrious jurist of Salemi. The Institute incorporates the High School and Technical Institute both located in Salemi, the Professional Institute of State for Industry and crafts (the operator of the fashion industry) based in Gibellina and Vocational of State for Industry and crafts (technical sector of the electricity industry) based in Santa Ninfa. Formerly the High School, known as the "Father Maurizio High School", was located in the convent of S. Augustine, now home to some municipal offices.

=== Museums ===
Museum of Sacred Art (Museo di Arte Sacra) - It houses the works from some of the churches were destroyed or damaged by the earthquake of 1968. The core consists of sculptures of the '400 and '500 Sicilian, including many examples of the work of Domenico Gagini and a marble Madonna and Child attributed to Francesco Laurana.
The Museum contains the beautiful chapel of the "Santa House" built in 1705, a faithful copy of the Holy House of Loreto.

Museo del Risorgimento - This museum was reopened to the public on the occasion of the celebrations for the 150th anniversary of the unification of Italy. Through the documentary sources of the Municipal Historical Archive, paintings, portraits and collections of weapons of the time, the museum is a testimony to the participation of Salemi in the process of unification and the entrance of Garibaldi and the Thousand in Sicily.

Museum of the Mafia (Museo della Mafia) - The Mafia Museum was created by the Sicilian Caesar Inzerillo, together with the youth of the Sgarbi Laboratory. Dedicated to Leonardo Sciascia, a symbol of the anti-mafia not rhetoric, using the language of art to talk about the Mafia in a provocative and unconventional way, through a multi-sensory, contrived to immerse the visitor.

Museum of Stone Campanedda (Museo della Pietra Campanedda) - Inside the Museum of Stone Campanedda there are works of the Scalisi brothers, Anthony and Joseph, Salemi artists that sculpt this particular stone. Among the works you can see the replica of the statue of the Immaculate Conception, dating back to August 2012 and at the center of the room, a replica at 1:50 scale of the Norman-Swabian Castle of Salemi.

Archaeological Museum (Museo di Archeologia) - The Museum of Archaeology holds a variety of finds from the excavations of nearby sites: Mokarta, Monte Polizzo, Basilica San Micele, and Salemi itself.

Museum of Bread (Museo del Pan) - The museum reflects the following: The folklore of Salemi is concentrated in a deep devotion to bread, celebrated at St. Joseph's Day March 19. In particular, between 18 and 25 March, as every year, the streets are decorated with lights, ribbons and objects, all made with bread. According to the classic Sicilian food iconography, bread represents the effort of workers and the body of Christ. For this reason, bread is respected and honored, and even today many Sicilians, as a sign of reverence and grace, before throwing away a loaf of bread, will kiss it. The Dinners of St. Joseph, that the tables laden with so many delicacies, are a sign of devotion and are visited in their homes and churches of the country.

=== Archaeology ===
Excavations conducted by Michael Kolb of Northern Illinois University have provided strong evidence that Salemi is built upon the ruins of old Halyciae, and ancient settlements of the Elymians, also known as Alicia in more recent Italian scholarship. Recovered finds document the presence of residual 6th century BC activity and 4th–3rd century BC settlement. Despite centuries of medieval and modern occupation, the presence of Greek era ceramics and mosaics throughout Salemi's old town suggest the presence of a major 4th century BC commercial and residential center.

== People ==
The following are some individuals related either by birth or by residence to Salemi:

- Umberto, Count of Salemi - noble
- Alberto Favara - ethnomusicologist and composer
- Tony Scott (musician) - jazz musician
- Stefano La Colla - (1889-1966)
- Vittorio Sgarbi - art critic and former mayor
- Gaspare Messina - first boss of New England Mafia that would later be known as the Patriarca crime family

== Economy ==
The economy of Salemi rests mainly on agriculture and marketing of the production of wine, grain, oil, and citrus. Agricultural production is predominantly wine, cereal and olive oil. Salemi's livestock sector includes the breeding of sheep, cattle, and horses. There are also craft activities such as food production, as well as small-industry including building materials.

== Infrastructure ==
Salemi is located just a few kilometers from the A29 motorway that travels between Palermo and Mazara del Vallo. You can reach Trapani along a branch of A29 or the highway 113. Salemi is crossed by two roads. The highway 188 connecting Marsala with Lercara Friddi and State Road 188A combining Salemi and Calatafimi-Segesta, it is also possible to use the highway 119 connecting Alcamo with Castelvetrano to reach the south of the province.

In particular, Salemi is 35 km (22 miles) from Trapani, 78 km (48 miles) from Palermo, 134 km (83 miles) from Agrigento, 204 km (127 miles) from Caltanissetta, 326 km (202.5 miles) from Catania, 239 km (148.5 miles) from Enna, 337 km (209 miles) from Messina, 270 km (168 miles) from Ragusa, 351 km (218 miles) from Syracuse.
