= Antonio D'Alì (born 1951) =

Italian politician (born 1951)

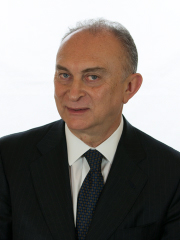

President of the Province of Trapani
- In office 13 June 2006 – 13 February 2008
- Preceded by: Giulia Adamo
- Succeeded by: Girolamo Turano

Undersecretary of State for the Ministry of the Interior
- In office 12 June 2001 – 17 May 2006
- Prime Minister: Silvio Berlusconi
- Minister: Claudio Scajola (2001–02); Giuseppe Pisanu (2002–06)

Senator of the Republic
- In office 18 April 1994 – 22 March 2018

Personal details
- Born: 25 December 1951 (age 74) Trapani, Sicily, Italy
- Party: Forza Italia (1994–2009); The People of Freedom (2009–2013); New Centre-Right (2013–2014); Forza Italia (2014–2022)
- Education: Sapienza University of Rome
- Profession: Banker, entrepreneur

Antonio D'Alì (born 25 December 1951) is an Italian politician who served as a senator of the Republic from 1994 to 2018, as undersecretary of State for the Interior from 2001 to 2006, and as president of the Province of Trapani from 2006 to 2008.
