= GO 59 =

History

Italy
- Name: GO 59
- Builder: Cantiere Navale Giacalone di Mazara del Vallo (Trapani)
- Cost: €7 million
- Laid down: 2013
- Launched: 2014
- Acquired: 2011
- Commissioned: march 2014
- In service: 1
- Homeport: Brindisi

General characteristics
- Type: Floating dry dock
- Length: - 70.00 m (229 ft 8 in) LOA; - working length = 60.00 m (196 ft 10 in)
- Beam: - 19.0 m (62 ft 4 in); - working beam = 14.0 m (45 ft 11 in)
- Draught: 8.0 m (26 ft 3 in) (max)
- Draft: 9.5 m (31 ft 2 in) (max)
- Notes: lifting capability 1.000 t (0.984 long tons)

GO 59 is a Floating dry dock of the Marina Militare.

== History ==
Delivered to Arsenale Militare Marittimo di Augusta on 26 March 2014, it was transferred to Stazione Navale di Brindisi on 24 February 2016.
These are the technical specifications of MM for its realization.
