= Roman ship of Marausa =

Ancient shipwreck

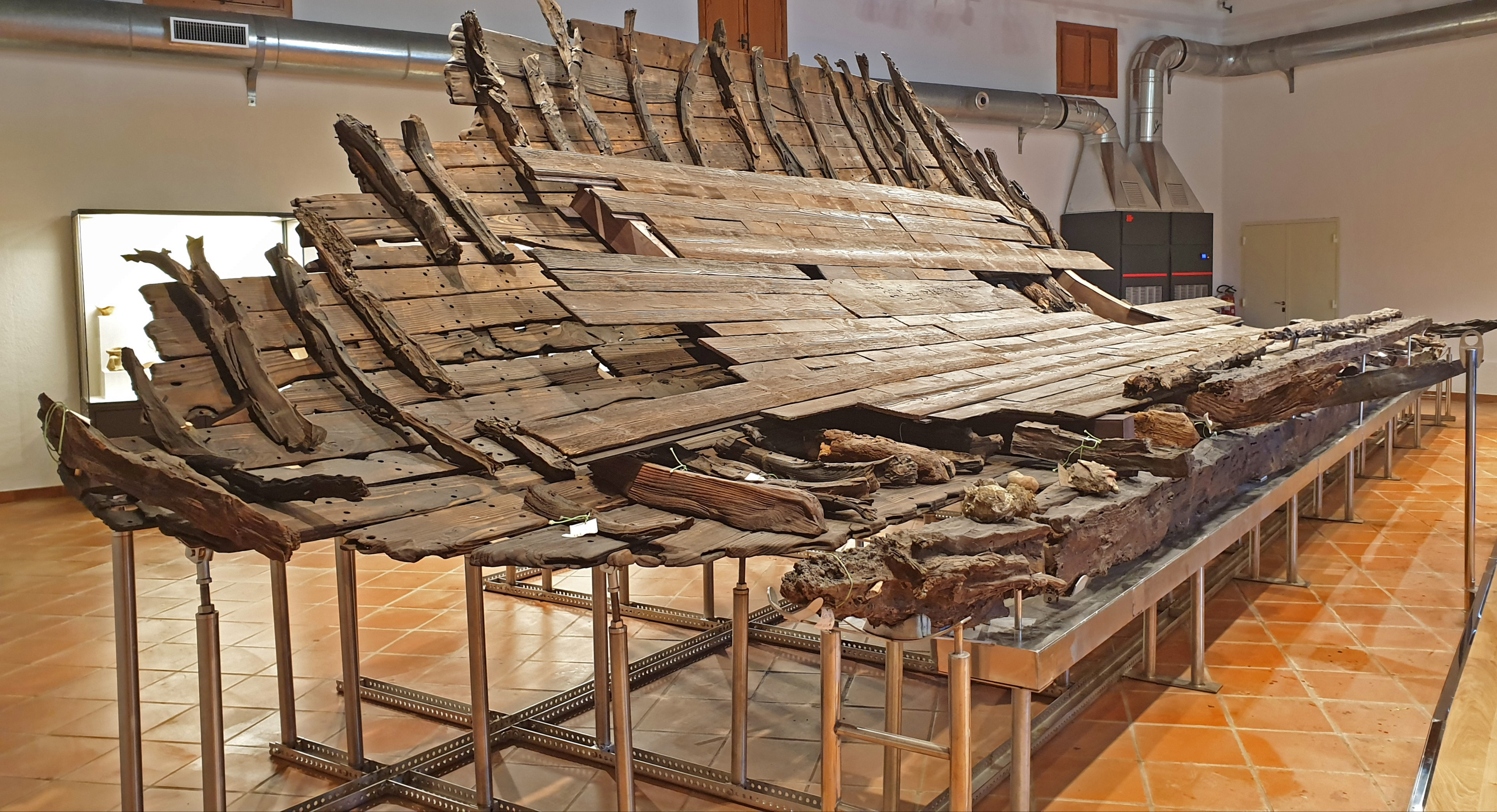

General characteristics
- Type: Merchant ship
- Length: About 27 metres (88 feet)

The Roman ship of Marausa (Italian: Nave romana di Marausa) is the wreck of Roman merchant ship from the third century AD which was discovered about 150 metres off the coast from Trapani.

== Description ==
In August 1999, a number of members of the Archeoclub of Trapani reported the remains of a shipwreck. It proved to be the remains of a large Roman ship from the third century AD, which had been wrecked at a depth of a little more than two metres, near the beach at Marausa, one of the frazioni (hamlets) of the comune (city council) of Trapani. The wreck was excavated and recovered in 2011 and its restoration was carried out by the "Legni e Segni della Memoria" ("Wood and Signs of Memory") society of Salerno.

The ship had a well-preserved cargo and was around 27 metres long and 9 metres wide, making it the largest wreck from the period ever recovered from Italian waters. It was originally wrecked in the shallows while attempting to enter the Birgi, which was a navigable river in Roman times.

The double central kelson of the ship was recovered, making it possible to reconstruct the structure of the deck, which consisted of staggered off-set platforms. The ribbing of ash wood was located between the ship's external shell (made of ash wood) and the decking. The cargo consisted of cylindrical African amphorae.

== Recovery and display ==
The soprintendenza of cultural goods of Trapani planned a project to conserve the ship and display it in Castello della Colombaia, which is located on an island near the site of the wreck and was being converted into a museum at the time. The project cost a total of €7,300,000, supplied by the European Union.

In September 2015, the Sicilian regional government decided to transfer the ship to the Museo archeologico Baglio Anselmi, sparking harsh criticism from the city council of Trapani. The move was carried out anyway and the ship has been displayed at the museum in Marsala since 18 December 2015.

== See also ==
- Alkedo
- Arles Rhône 3
- Battle of Drepana
- List of surviving ancient ships

== Bibliography ==
- Maria Bollini, Il porto romano e le flotte, Adriapress, 2005
