= Halyciae =

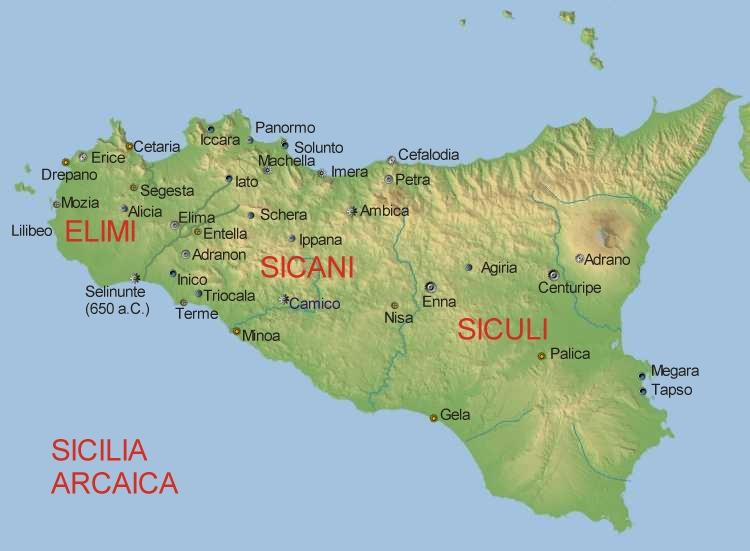

Halyciae (Halykiai, Halykiae) is the ancient name for one of the settlements of the Elymians on the island of Sicily, known as Alicia in more recent Italian scholarship.

Though its present location is not known precisely, recent excavations conducted in Sicily by Michael Kolb of Northern Illinois University indicate that the present city of Salemi in the province of Trapani is built upon the ruins of old Halyciae. Recovered finds document the presence of residual 6th century BC activity and 4th–3rd century BC settlement, lending credence to the idea that Salemi is ancient Halyciae. Despite centuries of medieval and modern occupation, the presence of Greek era ceramics and mosaics throughout Salemi's old town suggest the presence of a major 4th century BC commercial and residential centre.

Digs have also been conducted on an adjacent site known as Monte Polizzo by archaeologists from the University of Oslo and the Soprintendenza di Trapani, with help from University of Gothenburg and Stanford University as well as a team from MiT.
