= Salvatore Quinci =

Italian politician (born 1966)

President of the Free Municipal Consortium of Trapani
- Incumbent
- Assumed office 28 April 2025
- Preceded by: Office established

Mayor of Mazara del Vallo
- Incumbent
- Assumed office 14 May 2019
- Preceded by: Nicolò Cristaldi

Personal details
- Born: 8 April 1966 (age 60) Erice, Province of Trapani, Italy
- Education: University of Palermo

Salvatore Quinci (born 8 April 1966) is an Italian politician who has served as president of the Free Municipal Consortium of Trapani since 2025 and as mayor of Mazara del Vallo since 2019.

== Life and career ==
Quinci graduated in mathematics from the University of Palermo. He worked for the Italian Revenue Agency, where he held several positions, including director of the Territorial Office in Marsala and head of the assessment team at the agency's office in Castelvetrano. He also served as head of the section for individuals, self-employed workers and non-commercial entities at the Provincial Directorate of Trapani.

Quinci entered politics in the 2019 municipal elections, running for mayor of Mazara del Vallo as the candidate of four civic lists. After receiving the largest share of the vote in the first round, he was elected mayor in the run-off against Lega-backed candidate Giorgio Randazzo on 14 May 2019. He was re-elected mayor in 2024, shifting his electoral alliance towards the centre-right with the support of Brothers of Italy.

In April 2025, Quinci was elected president of the Free Municipal Consortium of Trapani against Giovanni Lentini, mayor of Castelvetrano. Quinci was supported by a civic and centre-left coalition that included the Democratic Party, the Five Star Movement, Italia Viva, the Italian Socialist Party, and civic movements, while Lentini was supported by the centre-right parties. His election restored elected political leadership to the former Province of Trapani after more than ten years of extraordinary administration.

Some commentators have criticised his cross-party approach as "political transformism", while Quinci has described it as an expression of civic politics (civismo) rather than adherence to a particular party alignment.
