= Guarrato =

Coordinates: 38.0167°N 12.5167°E

- Frazione
- Location of Guarrato in Italy
- Country: Italy
- Region: Sicily
- Province: Province of Trapani
- Comune: Misiliscemi
- Elevation: 56 m (184 ft)

Population
  - Total: 1,300
- Demonym: Guarratari
- Time zone: UTC+1 (CET)
  - Summer (DST): UTC+2 (CEST)
- Postal code: 91031
- Dialing code: 0923
- Patron saint: True Cross

Guarrato is a frazione of the comune of Misiliscemi, located on the road to Marsala, about 10 km from Trapani city, on the west coast of Sicily in Italy.

The origin of the settlement dates to the 13th century. According to one theory, the name of the settlement comes from the Sicilian word "guarratu", which might be a variant of "quadradu" (square). Another theory derives the name from the Marsalese Guarrato family, which settled in the area.

== Places of interest ==
The church is from 1869 and is one of the most notable in the rural hinterland of Trapani. There are several Bagli in the area, including the Baglio dei Coffa and the Baglio dei dannati.

== Events ==
Every year on the date of patron saint's feast, 14 September, there is a procession in honour of the True Cross.

From 2001 to 2012, there was a parade of floats through the roads of the town for carnevale. During that decade, it was the only carnevale parade in the comune of Trapani.

From 2009, "I Sapori dell'Estate" (The tastes of summer) has taken place on the first days of August, featuring the tasting of typical products, as well as cultural, artistic, and musical performances.

In 2010, from 15–19 September, it was the seat of the 6^ Miarp, an international meeting of cooks and confectioners. During the course of the festival, the Guinness World Record for the world's largest cassata (1,029 kg) was achieved, with Liz Smith of London acting as judge.

== Sport ==
Guarrato is the home of the fan club of the Trapani Calcio, the Trapani Club Guarrato, which was established in 1996.

In 2012, the Nicola Gervasi Guarrato amateur soccer team was established, which competed in the second category championship after winning the third category play-off in 2013/14. The team is named after Nicola Gervasi, a thirty year old football player from Guarrato who died in February 2011 after heart surgery. The home matches of the team take place at the commune's "Enzo Borghi" field in Bonacerami.
