= Misiliscemi =

- Comune
- Comune di Misiliscemi
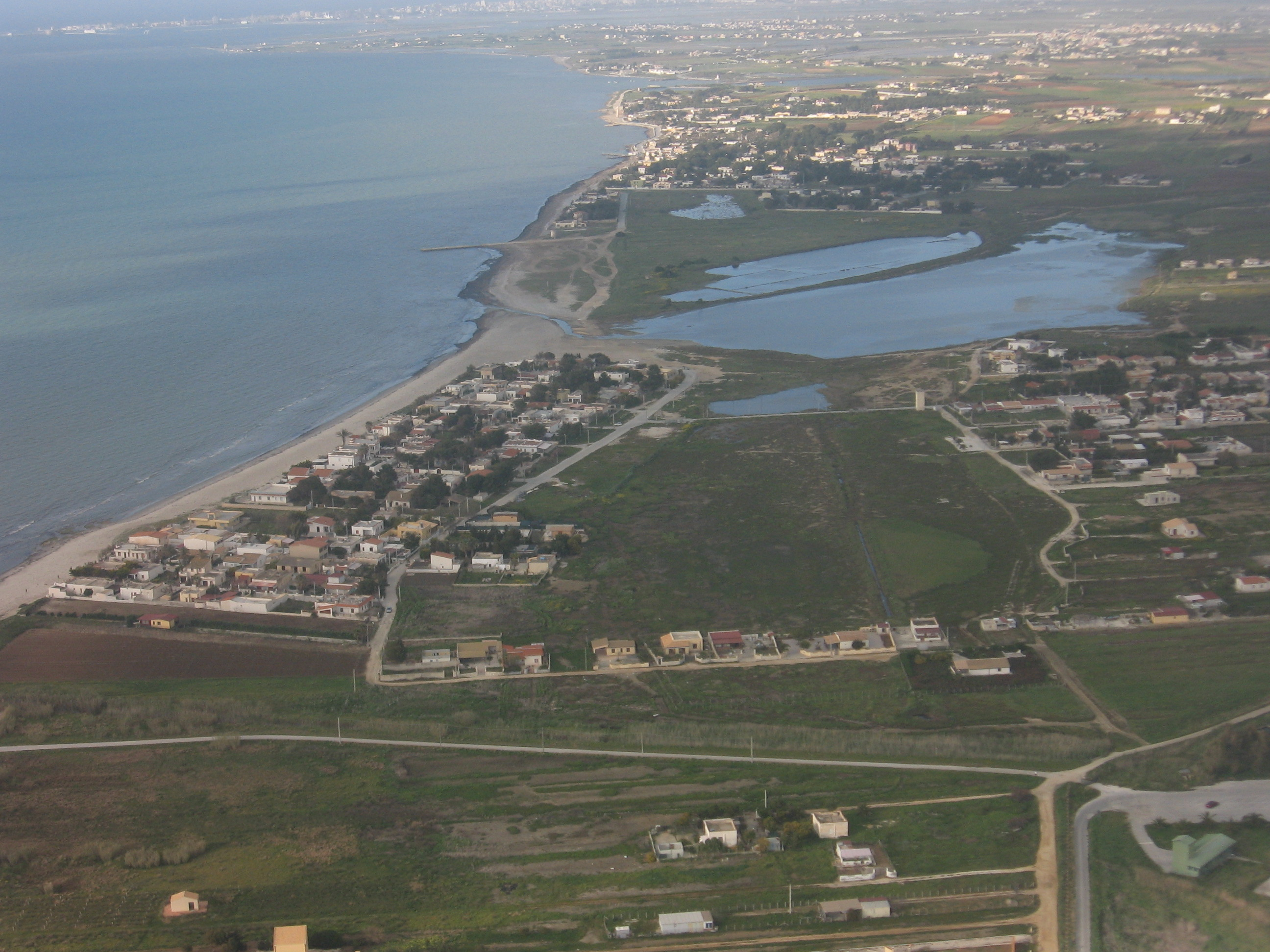
- The frazione Marausa

- Location within Italy Location within Sicily
- Coordinates: 37°53′06.54″N 12°38′07.11″E
- Country: Italy
- Region: Sicily
- Province: Trapani (TP)
- Founded: 20 February 2021
- Frazioni: Fontanasalsa, Guarrato, Rilievo, Locogrande, Marausa, Palma, Salinagrande, Pietretagliate

Government
  - Mayor: Carmelo Burgio (Commissario straordinario)(since 16 April 2021)

Area
  - Total: 92.53 km^{2} (35.73 sq mi)
- Elevation: 16 m (52 ft)

Population (2026)
  - Total: 8,446
  - Density: 91.28/km^{2} (236.4/sq mi)
- Demonym: Misilesi
- Time zone: UTC+1 (CET)
  - Summer (DST): UTC+2 (CEST)
- Postal code: 91100
- Dialing code: 0923
- ISTAT code: 081025

Misiliscemi is a comune (municipality) in the province of Trapani in the autonomous island region of Sicily in Italy. It has 8,446 inhabitants.

Misiliscemi was formed in 2021 as result of the 2018 referendum, in which the inhabitants of the eight frazioni of Trapani voted for the formation of Misiliscemi, with 3,752 votes in favor out of 7,530 voters.

Misiliscemi borders the municipalities of Marsala, Paceco and Trapani.

== Etymology ==
The comune is named after a river which arose in it. The term derives from Masil Escemmu, which is in turn derived from the Arabic Manzil-al-Escemmu which means "High place where the water flows".

== Demographics ==
As of 2026, the population is 8,446, of which 50.9% are male, and 49.1% are female. Minors make up 14.3% of the population, and seniors make up 26.5%.

Historical population
Year	Pop.	±%
1991	7,690	—
2001	7,499	−2.5%
2011	7,971	+6.3%
2021	8,415	+5.6%
Source: City Population, ISTAT

=== Immigration ===
As of 2025, immigrants make up 6.7% of the total population. The 5 largest foreign countries of birth are Romania, Pakistan, Tunisia, The Gambia, and Mali.
