= Elymian language =

Ancient Indo-European language in Sicily

Elymian
- Region: Sicily
- Ethnicity: Elymians
- Extinct: 3rd century BC
- Language family: Indo-European: Anatolian or Italic; Elymian
- Writing system: Greek alphabet

Language codes
- ISO 639-3: xly
- Glottolog: elym1237
- Elymian was spoken in the red region.

Elymian is the extinct language of the ancient Elymian people of western Sicily. Its characteristics are little known because of the extremely limited and fragmentary nature of the surviving texts.

The origins of Elymian and its exact relationships with other languages are unclear due to scarcity of data. It is generally assumed to have been an Indo-European language, but its classification within the Indo-European family is disputed. It has been speculated that Elymian was related to either the Italic languages or the Anatolian languages (such as Hittite), although both theories are disputed - with the first as preferred by the scholars.

An Early Iron Age idiom, Elymian seems to have been spoken until the 3rd century BC.

== Characteristics ==
Only a handful of Elymian texts have survived, dating from between the 6th and 4th centuries BC. These comprise a few proper names recorded by non-Elymian sources; inscriptions in the Greek alphabet on several coins, which include the names of Elymian cities; and inscriptions in the Greek alphabet on about 170 fragments of pottery (found mostly in a votive deposit at the ruined Elymian city of Segesta). These texts have been identified as Elymian, based on their evidently non-Hellenic characteristics, location and age.

The majority of textual artefacts are very short and fragmentary, comprising only a few letters. A small number of longer texts apparently contain a personal name and may have been dedicatory epigraphs. They sometimes appear to resemble Hellenic dedicatory epigraphs, in which an anthroponym in genitive form is followed by a verb literally meaning "I am" in order to convey "belonging".

A vase found at Montedoro, around 15 km southwest of Palermo, features one of the few complete inscriptions in Elymian. It has been tentatively translated to read "I [the pot] am [a gift] of Ata Tuka", or "I am [a gift] of Ata of [= son of] Tuka".

== Classification ==
The inclusion of Elymian within the Indo-European language family is generally accepted, but its further affiliation to the established branches of Indo-European is still disputed. Proposed classifications of the Elymian language can be summarized under two main positions.

Some historical linguists agreed that some peculiarities of that language – like non-alphabetic symbols engraved on some dedicatory fragments of pots, and genitive in -ai found in almost all the complete sequences – are suggestive of a connection to the Anatolian languages, and in particular, to Hittite. Other historical linguists classified Elymian as related to the Italic languages on the basis of other possible features.

Subsequently, the latter thesis found success among the scholars, whose broad consensus recognizes Elymian as an Italic idiom for northwestern Sicily (albeit without the support of overwhelming evidence), although a different italicity from Siculian, spoken further east; instead the Anatolian thesis is no longer supported except by a minority of scholars.

However, any resolution of the question of affiliation appears to rely on further archaeological investigations at Elymian settlements in western Sicily.
