= List of presidents of the Province of Trapani =

President of the Province of Trapani
- Presidente della Provincia di Trapani; Presidente del Libero consorzio comunale di Trapani
- Incumbent; Salvatore Quinci since 28 April 2025
- Inaugural holder: Antonino Turretta
- Formation: 1889

The president of the Province of Trapani was the head of the provincial administration of Trapani, a local government authority in Sicily, Italy. Since 2025, the chairman of the provincial administration is the president of the Free Municipal Consortium (Libero consorzio comunale).

== List ==
=== Presidents of the Provincial Deputation (1889–1927) ===
| No. | Portrait | Name | Term of office | | Party |
| No. | Portrait | Name | Start | End | Party |
|---|---|---|---|---|---|
| 1 | | Antonino Turretta | 1889 | 1904 | ? |
| 2 | | Enrico Platamone | 1904 | 1905 | ? |
| 3 | | Agostino Burgarella | 1907 | 1910 | ? |
| (1) | | Antonino Turretta | 1910 | ? | ? |

=== Presidents of the Province (1947–2012) ===
| No. | Portrait | Name | Term of office | | Party |
| No. | Portrait | Name | Start | End | Party |
|---|---|---|---|---|---|
| | | ? | ? | ? | ? |
| | | Mario Barbara | ? | 26 July 1990 | Christian Democracy |
| | | Mario Barbara | 26 July 1990 | 28 April 1993 | Christian Democracy |
| | | Antonino Laudicina | 25 June 1993 | 4 November 1993 | Christian Democracy |
| | | Vincenzo Russo | 30 December 1993 | 29 June 1994 | Independent (centre-left) |
| | | Carmelo Spitaleri | 29 June 1994 | 25 May 1998 | Federation of the Greens |
| | | Giulia Adamo | 25 May 1998 | 10 June 2003 | Forza Italia |
| | | Giulia Adamo | 10 June 2003 | 22 December 2005 | Forza Italia |
| | | Antonio D'Alì | 13 June 2006 | 13 February 2008 | Forza Italia |
| – | | Salvatore Rocca (regional commissioner) | 10 March 2008 | 20 June 2008 | — |
| | | Girolamo Turano | 20 June 2008 | 31 August 2012 | Union of the Centre |

=== Regional commissioners (2012–2025) ===
| Name | Term of office | |
| Name | Start | End |
|---|---|---|
| Luciana Giammanco | 31 October 2012 | 11 April 2013 |
| Darco Pellos | 11 April 2013 | 19 February 2014 |
| Antonio Ingroia | 19 February 2014 | 31 October 2014 |
| Daniela Leonelli | 31 October 2014 | 1 December 2014 |
| Ignazio Tozzo | 1 December 2014 | 8 April 2015 |
| Angelo Sajeva | 8 April 2015 | 24 April 2015 |
| Giuseppe Amato | 24 April 2015 | 13 January 2017 |
| Raimondo Cerami | 13 January 2017 | 28 April 2025 |

=== Presidents of the Free Municipal Consortium (2025–present) ===
| No. | Portrait | Name | Term of office | | Party |
| No. | Portrait | Name | Start | End | Party |
|---|---|---|---|---|---|
| 1 | | Salvatore Quinci | 28 April 2025 | Incumbent | Independent (centre-left) |

== Sources ==
- "Storia amministrativa dell'ente". Ministero dell'Interno.
- Menichini, Piera (2005). "I presidenti delle Province dall'Unità alla Grande guerra: repertorio analitico". Storia Amministrazione Costituzione (13): 294–295.
