= Birgi (river) =

River in Italy

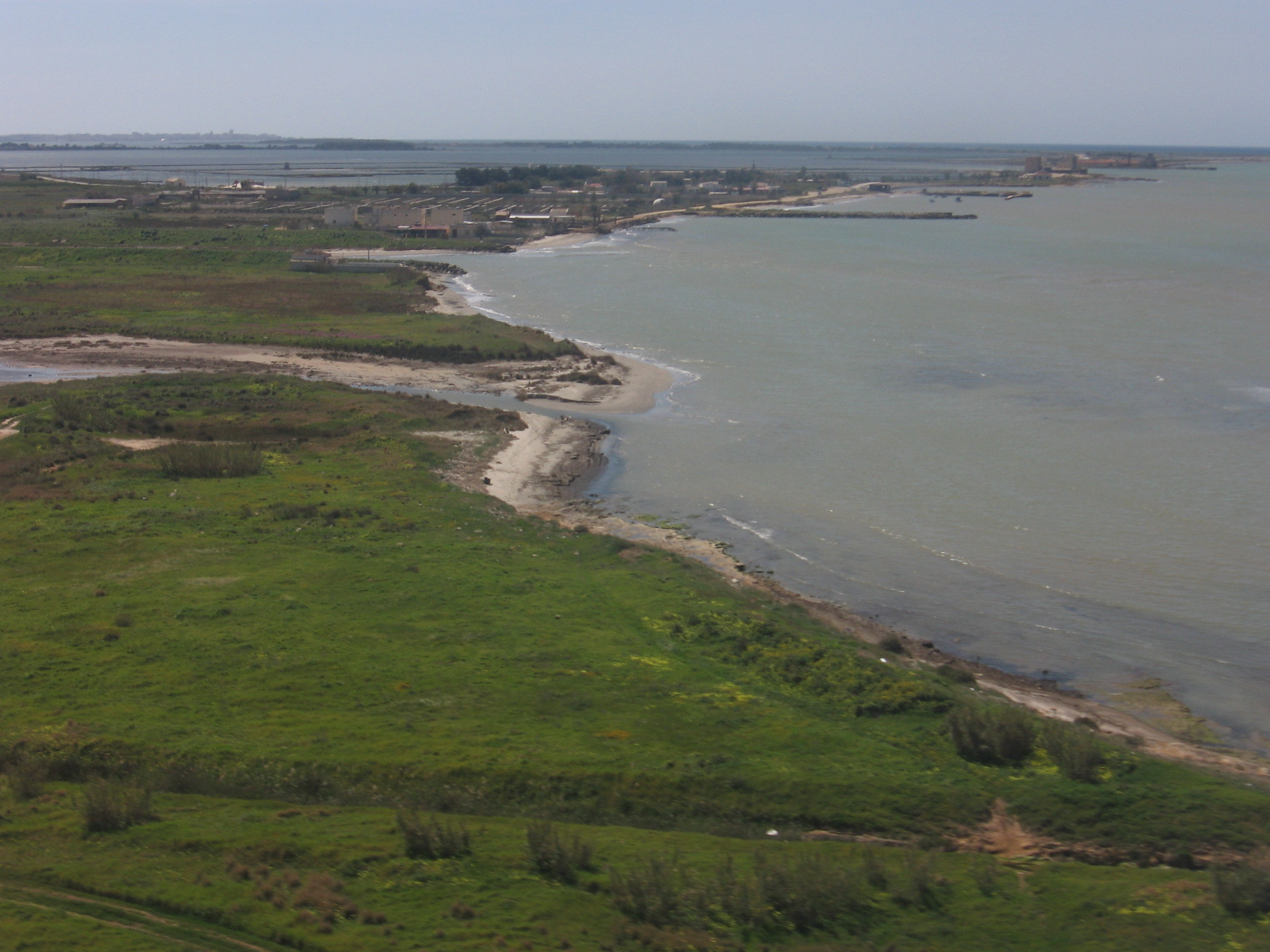

Location
- Country: Italy
- Region: Sicily

Physical characteristics
- Mouth: Tyrrhenian Sea
  - coordinates: 37°55′02″N 12°28′08″E
- Length: 43 km (27 mi)
- Basin size: 336 km^{2} (130 sq mi)

The Birgi is a river in the Province of Trapani, Sicily which debouches into the Tyrrhenian Sea between Marsala and Trapani.

== Course ==
The river arises in the territory of the comune of Buseto Palizzolo, where it is called the "Fittasi" river. It flows through the territory of the comune of Trapani and a small part of the comune of Paceco. On its way to the sea, it is joined from the left by the Cuddia river, which provides the majority of its annual water supply and is dammed to provide a water reservoir, called Lake Rubino, which has a capacity of 11.5 million cubic metres of water and a surface area of 1.57 km^{2}.

Further on, the river receives another tributary, the Chitarra River. Subsequently, the name of the river changes to the Mercanzotto, then the Chinisia, and finally the Birgi. In total the river is 43 km long and its hydraulic basin covers an area of 336 km^{2}.

=== Altered course ===
The natural mouth of the river was in the frazione of Marausa. The construction of Trapani Airport in 1961 required the course of the river to be moved two kilometres south and an artificial channel was built which now forms the final section of the river. The new course of the Birgi with its new levees was built long before the airport itself - the airport was built at the end of the 1950s, while the channel was built before 1940. The new channel is made of concrete and can be seen already in military aerial photographs from 1955.
