= Michael J. Kolb =

American anthropologist

Michael J. Kolb (born c. 1960) is an American anthropologist. He currently holds the position of Professor of Anthropology at Metropolitan State University of Denver and Presidential Teaching Professor Emeritus at Northern Illinois University, where he also served as Associate Vice Provost.

Kolb received his Ph.D. from the University of California, Los Angeles in 1991. Kolb has done field work in Polynesia, Europe, and Africa. His research focuses on ancient and historical political economies and the building of monumental architecture. He has published, amongst other things, on the labor energetics in medieval Sicily, ancient Egypt, prehistoric Europe, and Oceania. His most recent book is Making Sense of Monuments (2020).

His research at MSU Denver has focused on the historical archaeology of the downtown West Denver neighborhood (the Auraria Campus) and the water infrastructure of early Denver.

Kolb has worked in Hawaii as the director of the Na Heiau O Maui project, where he conducted an extensive study of ancient Maui temples published in Current Anthropology suggesting that the island temple system was 400 years older than previously thought. He has conducted research on household labor practices related to agroforestry in upland Maui that are relevant to the development of complex societies.

Kolb has also been the director of the Elymi Project in western Sicily, which aims to "describe human landscape transformations around three hilltop settlements" in western Sicily. He has conducted archaeological survey in western Sicily since 1998, revealing a rich settlement system in the community of Salemi that dates from the Copper Age to the medieval period, many of the sites being reoccupied over time. Kolb has also excavated at nearing Salemi, recovering finds that document the presence of residual 6th century BC activity and 4th–3rd century BC settlement, lending credence to the idea that Salemi is the ancient city of Halyciae of the Elymians. He has also discovered what appears to be medieval mosque while investigating Salemi's Norman castle.
