= Castelvetrano =

- Comune
- Città di Castelvetrano
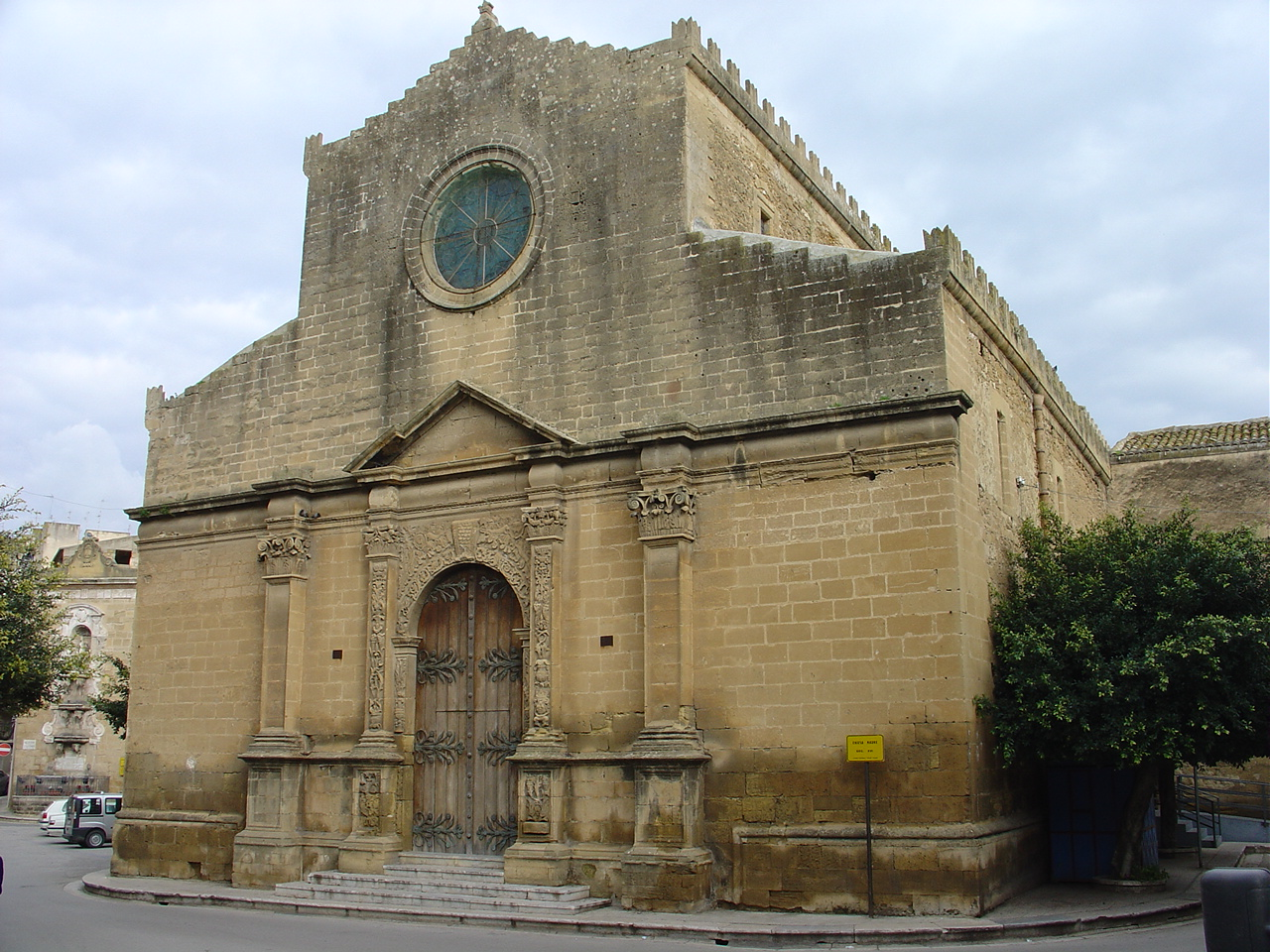
- Mother Church

- Coat of arms

- Castelvetrano within the Province of Trapani

- Location within Italy Location within Sicily
- Coordinates: 37°41′0″N 12°47′35″E
- Country: Italy
- Region: Sicily
- Province: Trapani (TP)
- Frazioni: Marinella (Selinunte), Triscina

Government
  - Mayor: Enzo Alfano

Area
  - Total: 209.76 km^{2} (80.99 sq mi)
- Elevation: 187 m (614 ft)

Population (28 February 2017)
  - Total: 31,680
  - Density: 151.0/km^{2} (391.2/sq mi)
- Demonym: Castelvetranesi
- Time zone: UTC+1 (CET)
  - Summer (DST): UTC+2 (CEST)
- Postal code: 91022
- Dialing code: 0924
- Patron saint: St. John the Baptist
- Saint day: 24 June
- Website: Official website

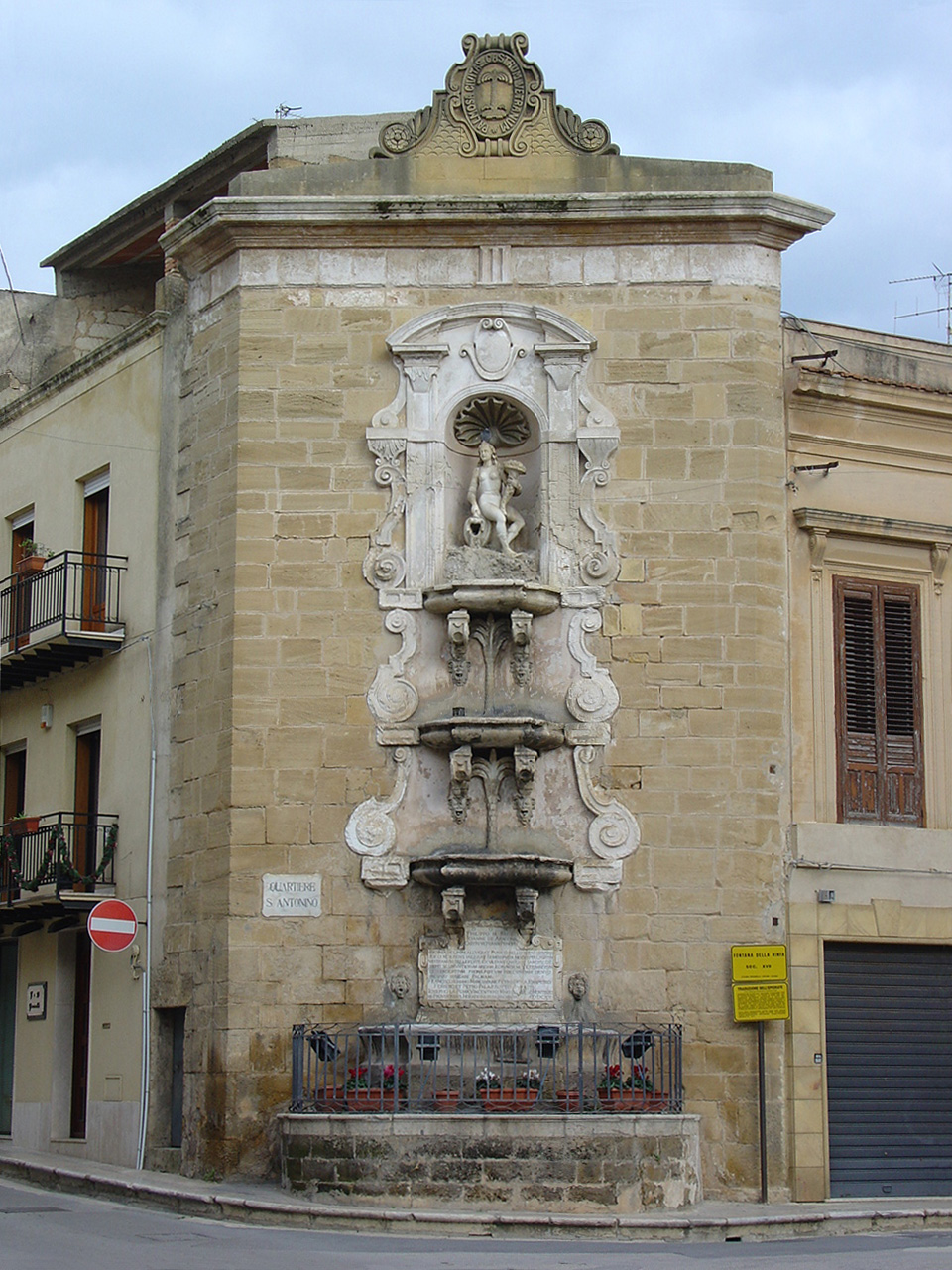
The Nymph Fountain.

Castelvetrano (Sicilian: Castiḍḍuvitranu) is a town and comune in the province of Trapani, Sicily, southern Italy. The archeological site of Selinunte is located within the municipal territory.

The municipality borders with Campobello di Mazara, Mazara del Vallo, Menfi, Montevago, Partanna, Salemi and Santa Ninfa.

== History ==
The first recorded mentions of Castelvetrano in the historical record date back to the 12th and 13th centuries. By the 15th century, records exist of a federation of local cities which includes Castelvetrano. The church of St. John, outside the city walls, dates back to this period and was founded in 1412.

== Economy ==
The economy is based predominantly on farming, with the cultivation of vines and olive trees being the main focus. Woodworking (mainly furniture) is also an important sector. Both Valle del Belìce olive oil and Nocellara del Belice DOP table olives have a protected status in the European Union.

== Main sights ==
The center of Castelvetrano consists of three linked squares and many monuments can be found within these areas. The main square is Piazza Tagliavia, which is adorned with many fine buildings including the town's principal church, the Chiesa Madre, which in its present form dates back to the sixteenth century. Inside the church are stuccoes by Ferraro and Giacomo Serpotta.

Near the church is the Municipio (town hall) and also close by is the Purgatory Church, built in 1624–64, with its façade filled with statues and the church of Chiesa di San Domenico built in 1470, inside the church is the marble sepulcher of the prince Carlo d'Aragona Tagliavia.

In the municipality of Castelvetrano, between the hamlets of Triscina and Marinella di Selinunte, is the archaeological park of Selinunte, an ancient Greek city.

== Notable people ==
- Alfonso Caruana, notorious Italian Canadian mafia boss and the head of the Canadian branch of Cuntrera-Caruana Mafia clan
- Giancarlo Commare, actor
- Giovanni Gentile, fascist philosopher and key advisor to Benito Mussolini
- Matteo Messina Denaro, Sicilian Mafia boss

== See also ==
- Castelvetrano Airfield
