= Paceco =

- Comune
- Città di Paceco
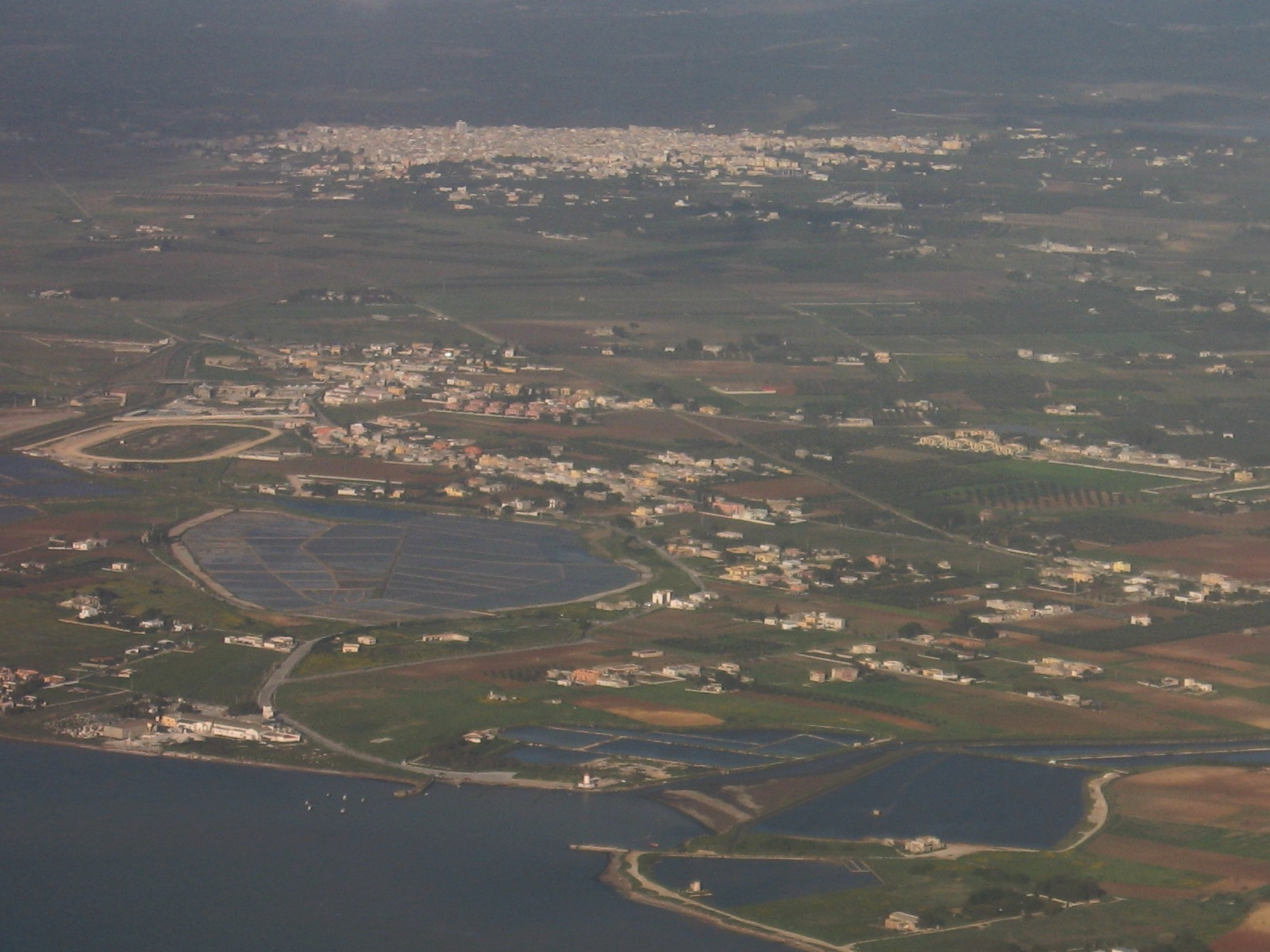

- Location within Italy Location within Sicily
- Coordinates: 37°59′N 12°33′E
- Country: Italy
- Region: Sicily
- Province: Trapani (TP)
- Frazioni: Dattilo, Nubia

Government
  - Mayor: Giuseppe Scarcella

Area
  - Total: 58 km^{2} (22 sq mi)
- Elevation: 36 m (118 ft)

Population (10 June 2018)
  - Total: 11,307
  - Density: 190/km^{2} (500/sq mi)
- Demonym: Pacecoti
- Time zone: UTC+1 (CET)
  - Summer (DST): UTC+2 (CEST)
- Postal code: 91027
- Dialing code: 0923
- Patron saint: St. Catherine of Alexandria
- Saint day: November 25
- Website: Official website

Paceco (Sicilian: Paceca) is a town and comune in Western Sicily, Italy, administratively part of the province of Trapani, located nearby the Trapani city area, a distance of 5 kilometres (3 mi).

Paceco is a small rural centre: among its agricultural products there are melons, cereals, olives, grapes, and cheese dairy products. In Paceco are also present some sheep-breedings.

The centre was founded in 1607 by the marquis Placido Fardella. The town is however named after his wife, Teresa Paceco of Vigliena. Conceived in conformity with a meditated urban scheme, Paceco's installation is a mesh perfectly orthogonal with some rectangular isolated (ippodomea plan), very recurrent in the inhabited places of the 17th century.

Local sights include the Cathedral Church, consecrated to the SS. Crucifix, built in 1623 and placed in the main piazza of the centre. Recently the Church has been entirely restored in order to make it regain the original beauty. In addition, there are the churches of Porto Salvo, Santo Padre, and Santa Lucia.

The city is connected via bus services from the neighbouring city of Trapani.
