= Mazara del Vallo =

Mazara del Vallo Mazzara (Sicilian)
- Comune
- Città di Mazara del Vallo
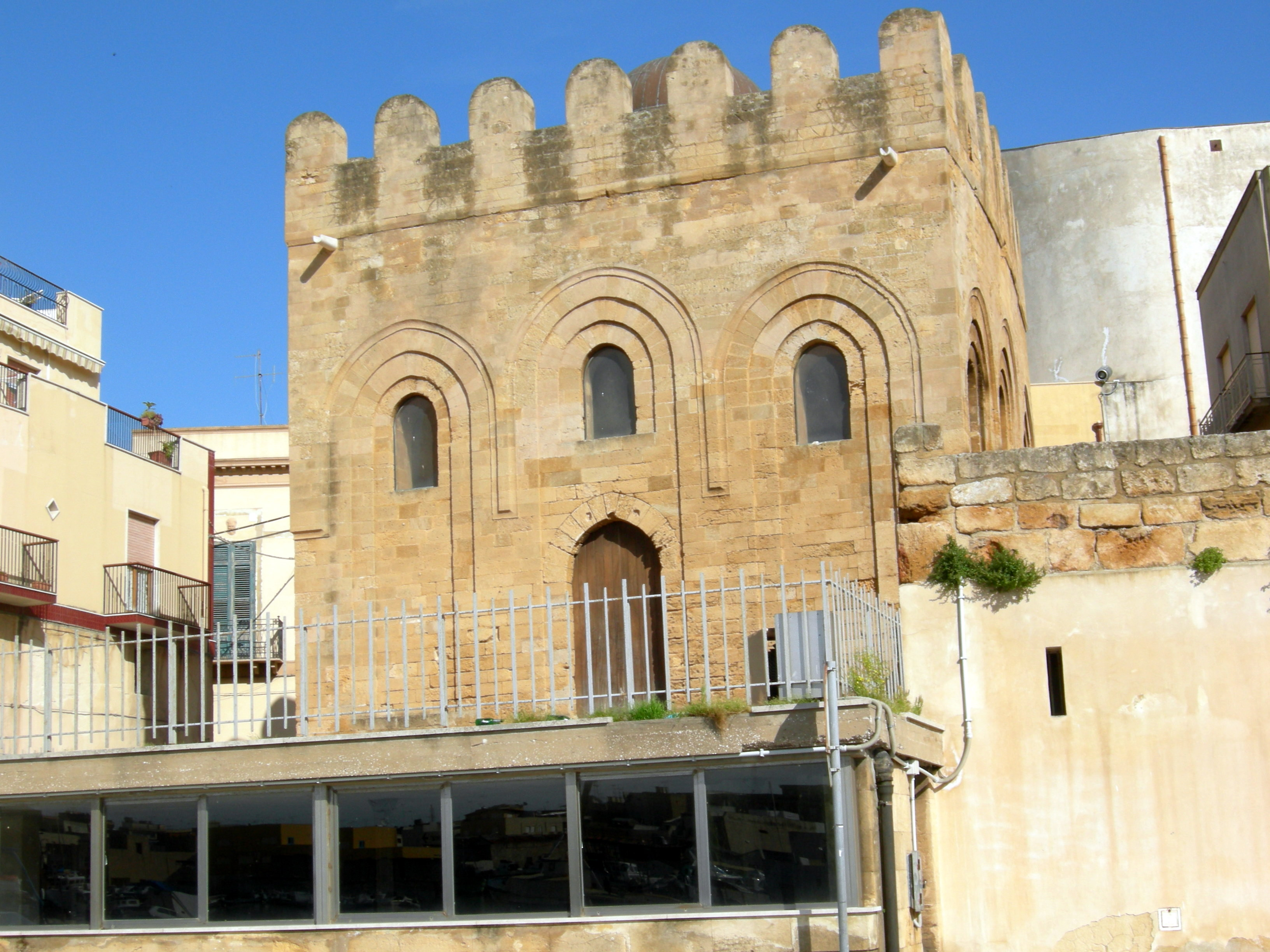
- Church of San Nicolò Regale

- Coat of arms

- Mazara within the Province of Trapani

- Location within Italy Location within Sicily
- Coordinates: 37°39′N 12°35′E
- Country: Italy
- Region: Sicily
- Province: Trapani (TP)
- Frazioni: Borgata Costiera, Mazara Due

Government
  - Mayor: Salvatore Quinci (Civic list)

Area
  - Total: 274.64 km^{2} (106.04 sq mi)
- Elevation: 8 m (26 ft)

Population (2026)
  - Total: 50,070
  - Density: 182.3/km^{2} (472.2/sq mi)
- Demonym: Mazaresi
- Time zone: UTC+1 (CET)
  - Summer (DST): UTC+2 (CEST)
- Postal code: 91026
- Dialing code: 0923
- Patron saint: St. Vitus
- Saint day: June 15
- Website: Official website

Mazara del Vallo (Italian: [madˈdzaːra del ˈvallo]; Sicilian: Mazzara [matˈtsaːɾa]) is a city and comune (municipality) in the Province of Trapani in the autonomous island region of Sicily in Italy. Lying mainly on the left bank at the mouth of the Mazaro river, it has 50,070 inhabitants.

It is an agricultural and fishing centre and its port gives shelter to the largest fishing fleet in Italy. The city is also one of the most historically significant in Sicily.

== History ==
=== Etymology and origins ===
Mazara was founded by the Phoenicians in the 9th century BC with the name of Mazar who made it an important mercantile emporium. The discovery of Phoenician vases demonstrate the existence of a Phoenician port built between the 6th and 5th centuries BC. Other evidence is in the palace of the Knights of Malta, where finds show the existence of the ancient Punic trading post. Also, a stone slab engraved with a Phoenician inscription found in the channel of the river Màzaro is now preserved in the Museum of the Dancing Satyr.

It then passed under the control of Greeks, Carthaginians, Romans, Vandals, Ostrogoths, Byzantines, before being occupied by the Arabs in the year 827 AD. During the Arab period, Sicily was divided into three different administrative regions, Val di Noto, Val Demone and Val di Mazara, making the city an important commercial harbour and centre of learning.

In 1072, Mazara was conquered by Normans, headed by Roger I. During that period, in 1093, the Roman Catholic Diocese of Mazara del Vallo was instituted.

After the death of Emperor Frederick II, Sicily passed to the Angevins, then followed by the Catalans of the Aragon Crown. The Aragon period (1282–1409) is characterized by a political, economic and demographic decline of Mazara. The city passed under the control of the House of Savoy in 1713, a reign which lasted only five years, being replaced by the Habsburg Empire (for 16 years) followed by the Bourbons. In 1860 the city was finally conquered by Giuseppe Garibaldi and the Mille, thus joining the then newly formed Kingdom of Italy.

The city was known as Mazzara del Vallo until the World War II period, following which the spelling was changed to Mazara del Vallo.

=== Contemporary era ===
Today Mazara is widely considered to be one of the most important fishing centres of Italy; tussles about fishing rights, especially with the North-African countries, figure large in the town's recent history, boat sequestrations being a common event. Currently the fishing business in the city seems to be less significant, mainly because of the increasing lack of younger people willing to work in the industry.

== Geography ==
Mazara borders the municipalities of Campobello di Mazara, Castelvetrano, Marsala, Petrosino, and Salemi. It counts the hamlets (frazioni) of Borgata Costiera and Mazara Due.

== Demographics ==
As of 2026, the population is 50,070, of which 49.7% are male, and 50.3% are female. Minors make up 16.5% of the population, and seniors make up 23.9%.

Historical population

Year	Pop.	±%
1861	11,068	—
1871	12,180	+10.0%
1881	13,341	+9.5%
1901	20,006	+50.0%
1911	25,251	+26.2%
1921	22,849	−9.5%
1931	24,360	+6.6%
1936	25,978	+6.6%

Year	Pop.	±%
1951	33,157	+27.6%
1961	36,725	+10.8%
1971	38,635	+5.2%
1981	43,748	+13.2%
1991	47,750	+9.1%
2001	50,377	+5.5%
2011	49,995	−0.8%
2021	50,312	+0.6%

Source: ISTAT

=== Immigration ===
As of 2025, the foreign-born population is 4,316, making up 8.6% of the total population. The 5 largest foreign countries of origin are Tunisia (2,437), Germany (300), Romania (151), Morocco (150) and Venezuela (106).

== Main sights ==
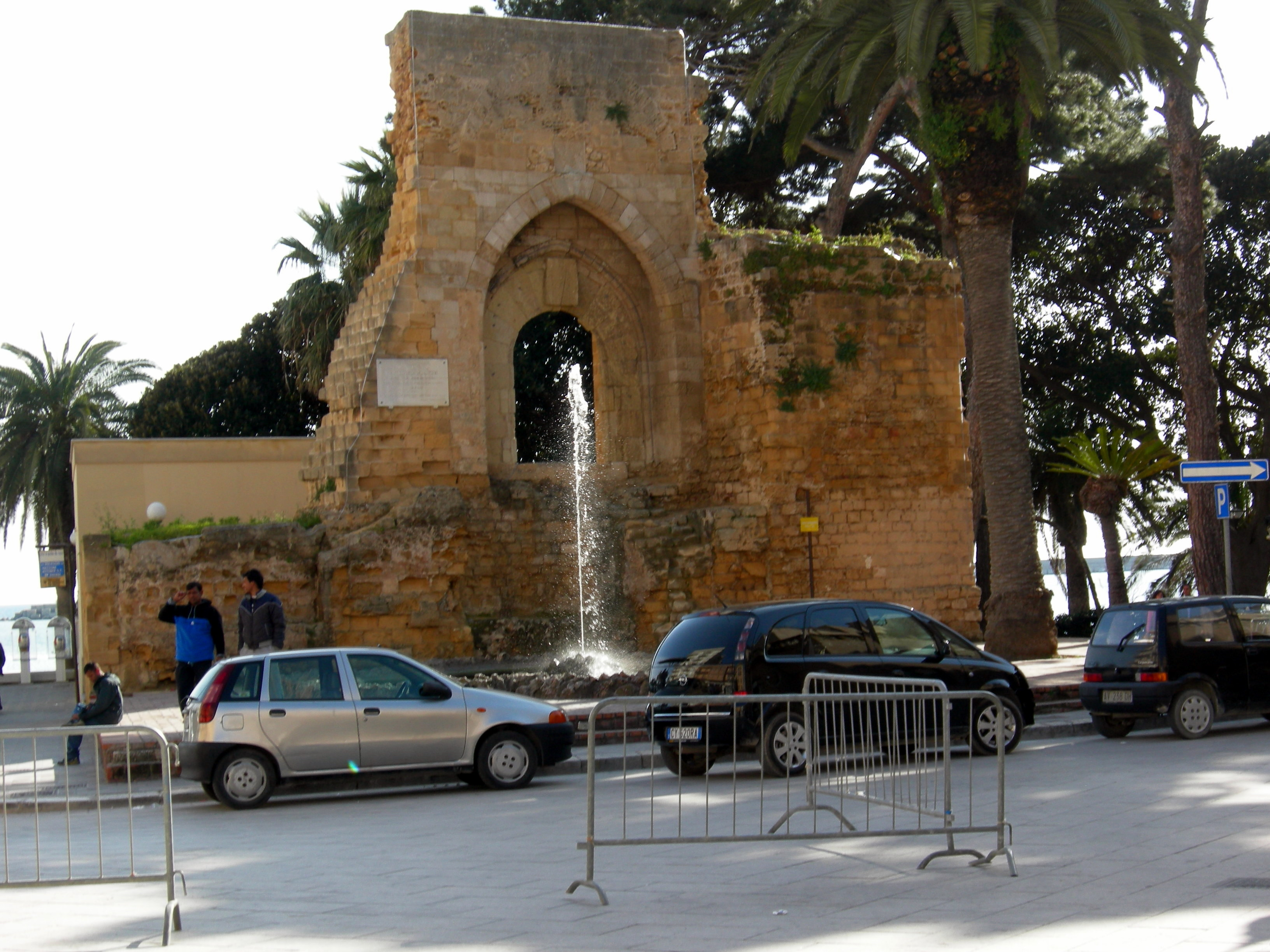
Norman Arc

Mazara made national news in March 1998, when a bronze statue called the Dancing Satyr (Satiro Danzante) was found off the port, at a depth of 500 metres (1,600 ft) in the Strait of Sicily by a local fishing boat. The statue is believed to have been sculpted by Greek artist Praxiteles and is now on display to the public in a dedicated museum in the city, after having been on show at the Chamber of Deputies of Rome, and in Aichi, Japan. After this event, the city quickly gained in terms of visiting tourists and a national advertising campaign was mounted with the slogan Mazara del Satiro.

Other attractions include the Norman Arc, that is the remains of the old Norman Castle built in 1073 and demolished in 1880, and a number of churches, including the Royal Saint Nicholas (San Nicolò Regale) Church, a rare example of Norman architecture built in 1124, the Seminary, built in 1710, which surrounds the main local piazza, Piazza della Repubblica, and St. Vitus on the Sea (San Vito a Mare) Church. In honour of St. Vitus, the official patronal saint as well as a native of Mazara del Vallo, the St. Vitus Feast (Lu Fistinu di Santu Vitu) is held every year.

== Transport ==
Mazara del Vallo is connected to the rest of Sicily by a regional train service (run by Trenitalia), a private bus service (only to Palermo), and by car, via the A29 highway (also known as Palermo-Mazara del Vallo). It is reachable from Trapani-Birgi Airport by an infrequent bus service or by taxi (€20 per person) and from Palermo by car or taxi.

== International relations ==
=== Twin towns - sister cities ===
- Mahdia, Tunisia
- Santa Pola, Spain
- Volos, Greece
- Trebisacce, Italy

== See also ==
- Diocese of Mazara del Vallo
- Mazara Calcio A.S.D.
- Al-Mazari
- 16th-century Western domes
