= Elymians =

Ancient tribal people in western Sicily

Approximate locations of the Elymians and their neighbors, the Sicani and the Sicels, in Sicily around 11th century BC (before the arrival of the Phoenicians and the Greeks).

The Elymians (Latin: Elymī) were an ancient tribal people who inhabited the western part of Sicily during the Bronze Age and Classical antiquity.

== Origins ==
According to Thucydides, the Elymians were refugees coming from the destroyed Troy. Instead, for Hellanicus of Lesbos, they arrived in Sicily coming from Italy, driven out by the Oenotrians. Furthermore, for the Greek historian, the Elymians would also have contributed to the formation of the Sicels.

The Elymian language is considered to have been a part of the Indo-European language family. While an ancient tradition that the Elymians came from Troy – and were originally an Anatolian people – is corroborated by archeological data, the more generally supported opinion is that Elymian was an Italic language, with similarities to Latin. Hence an Italic origin for the Elymians is considered to be more likely.

The Greek historian Philistus refers to the presence of a people of Ligurian origin, although he does not identify it with the Elymians. In modern times, historians such as Heinrich Nissen and Karl Julius Beloch investigated the possibilities of a Ligurian origin following the numerous common epigraphic and toponymic references, still found in the cities of Lerici, Segesta and Entella.

Apart from mythological tales, there is little known about the identity and culture of the Elymians. They are indistinguishable from their Sicani neighbours in the archaeological record of the early Iron Age (c. 1100–c. 700 BC). Thereafter, they appear to have adopted many aspects of the culture of the Greek colonists of Sicily, erecting the temple at Segesta and using the Greek alphabet to write their own language. As yet, no one has succeeded in deciphering the Elymian language.

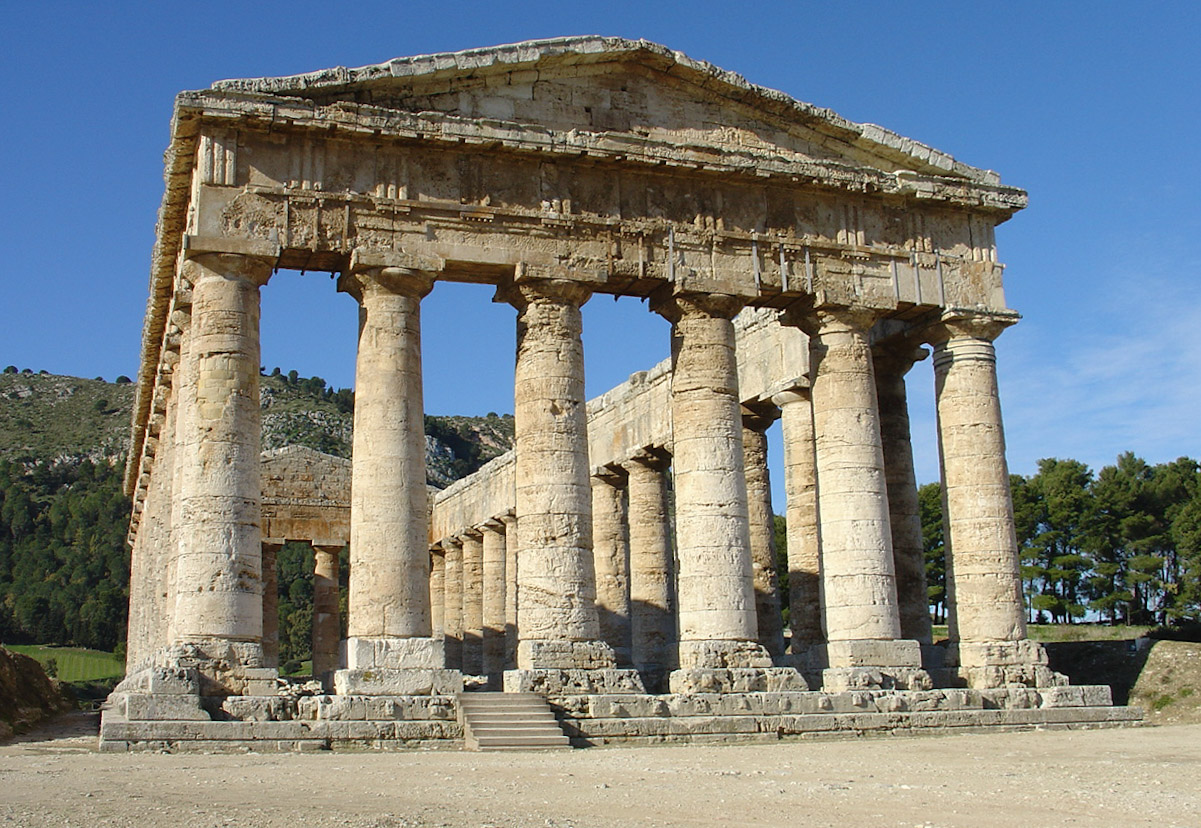
The Elymian temple at Segesta, Sicily.

== History ==
The Elymians maintained friendly relations (and alliances) with Carthage but came into frequent conflict with the expansionist Greek colonies of western Sicily, especially Selinus. Boundary disputes with Selinus broke out into open warfare on several occasions after 580 BC. They sought to ally first with Athens against Selinus, provoking the disastrous Sicilian expedition of 415–413 BC. Following this failure, they encouraged the Carthaginians to attack Selinus in 409 BC and succeeded in obtaining the destruction of their rivals.

However, they turned on Carthage during the First Punic War and allied with Rome instead. The Elymians were granted a privileged status under Roman rule and were exempted from taxes. This was said to have been in recognition of the Elymians' claim of Trojan ancestry, which was seen as making them cousins of the Roman people, who also claimed to have been descended from the Trojans. The Elymians appear to have largely disappeared from view under Roman rule, presumably becoming assimilated into the general Sicilian population.

== Areas of settlement ==
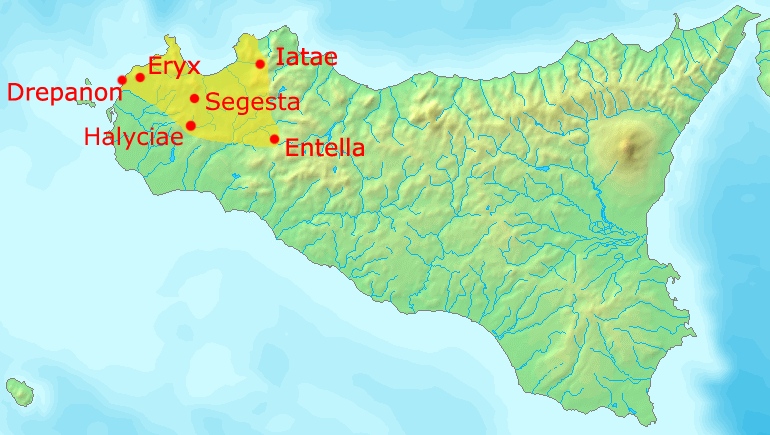
Map of approximate area of Elymian settlement, showing major cities.

The Elymi shared western Sicily with the Sicani, the Phoenicians, and later the Greeks. Their three most important cities were Segesta, the political centre; Eryx (the modern Erice), a religious centre; and Entella. Other cities were Elima, Halyciae (referred to as Alicia in modern Italian sources), Iaitas, Hypana, and Drepanon.

== See also ==
- Ancient peoples of Italy
- Prehistoric Italy
- Monte Polizzo

== Sources ==
- Giulia Falco: Elymoi. In: Der Neue Pauly (DNP) vol. 3, Metzler, Stuttgart 1997, ISBN 3-476-01473-8, Sp. 1003.
- Simona Marchesini: "The Elymian language"' in Olga Tribulato (ed..): Language and Linguistic Contact in Ancient Sicily. Cambridge University Press, 2012:95–114.
