= Province of Trapani =

Province of Trapani Provincia di Trapani (Italian) Pruvincia di Tràpani (Sicilian)
- Province
- Free Municipal Consortium of Trapani; Libero consorzio comunale di Trapani (Italian)
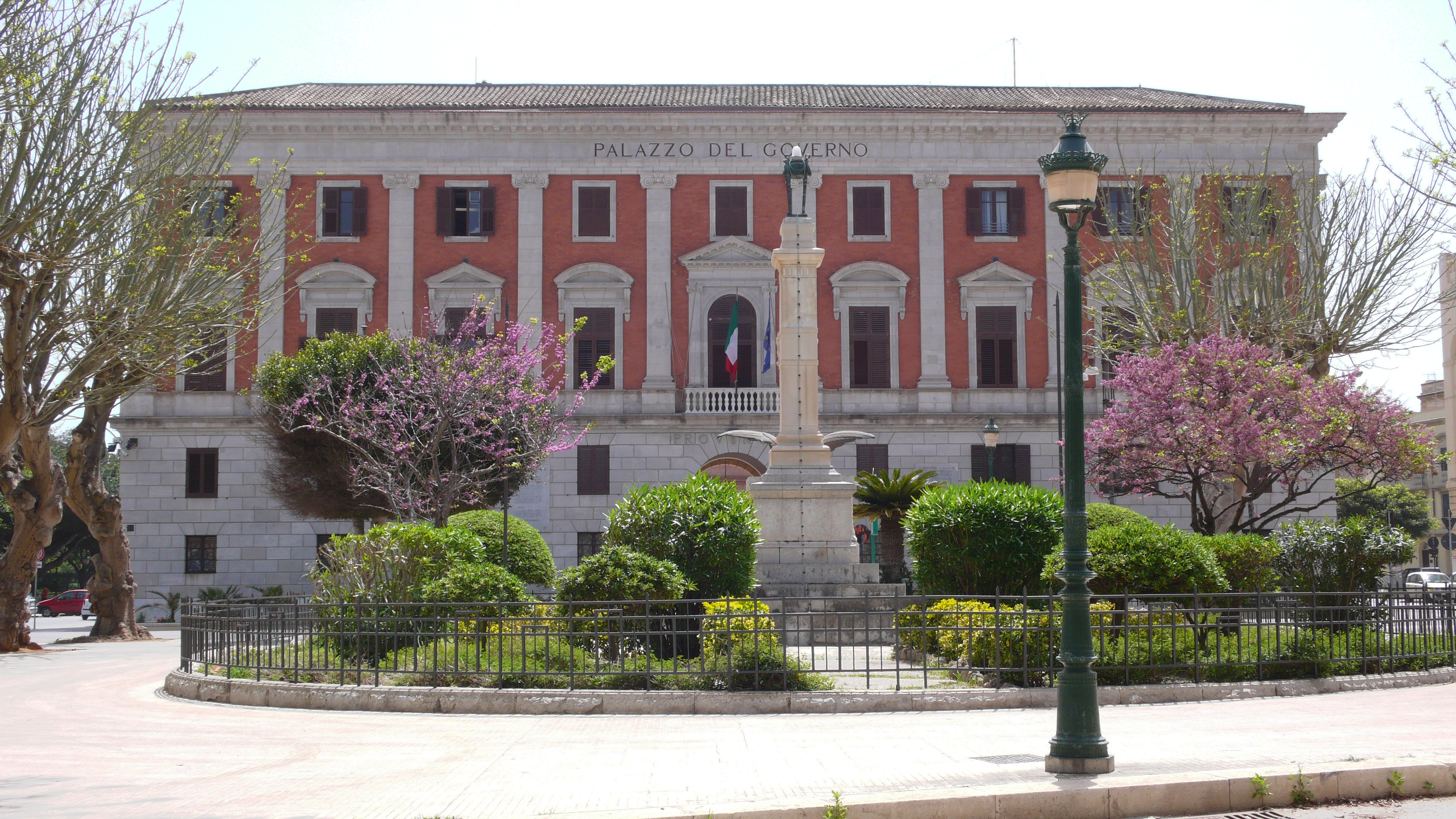
- The provincial seat

- Flag Coat of arms

- Location of the province of Trapani in Italy
- Coordinates: 38°01′02″N 12°32′43″E
- Country: Italy
- Region: Sicily
- Capital: Trapani
- Municipalities: 25

Government
  - President: Salvatore Quinci

Area
  - Total: 2,469.62 km^{2} (953.53 sq mi)

Population (2026)
  - Total: 410,602
  - Density: 166.261/km^{2} (430.615/sq mi)

GDP
  - Total: €6.735 billion (2015)
  - Per capita: €15,446 (2015)
- Time zone: UTC+1 (CET)
  - Summer (DST): UTC+2 (CEST)
- Postal code: 91100
- Telephone prefix: 0923–0924
- ISO 3166 code: IT-TP
- Vehicle registration: TP
- ISTAT code: 081

The province of Trapani (Italian: provincia di Trapani; Sicilian: pruvincia di Tràpani; officially libero consorzio comunale di Trapani) is a province in the autonomous island region of Sicily in Italy. Following the suppression of the Sicilian provinces, it was replaced in 2015 by the free municipal consortium of Trapani (Italian: libero consorzio comunale di Trapani). Its capital is the city of Trapani.

It has a population of 410,602 in an area of 2,469.62 square kilometres (953.53 mi^{2}) across its 25 municipalities.

== History ==
The area now covered by the province was occupied successively by the Carthaginians, Greeks and latterly by the Romans. The port of Trapani, first known as Drepana, then Drepanon, was inhabited by the Sicani and the Elymi becoming a prosperous Phoenician trading centre by the 8th century BC. It was taken by the Carthaginians in 260 BC and by the Romans in 240 BC, becoming a civitas romana until 440 AD when it was sacked by the Vandals, then by the Byzantines and ultimately by the Muslims in 830. In the 16th century, it received privileges under Emperor Charles V of Spain, who also strengthened the town walls. Trapani became the provincial capital in 1817.

== Geography ==
The province of Trapani borders the Tyrrhenian Sea to the north, the Mediterranean Sea to the south, and the Strait of Sicily to the west. It is bordered to the east with only the provinces of Palermo and Agrigento. The territory has few flat areas, although with the exception of the mountains of Sparagio (1,110 m) and Inici (1,065 m), most land is under 1,000 metres. The northwestern part is rugged in comparison to the south. The province also includes the archipelago of the Aegadian Islands belonging to the comune (municipality) of Favignana, the island of Pantelleria which is the largest of Sicily, in the comune of the same name, and the Stagnone Islands, which belong to the comune of Marsala. The Egadi Islands consist of three main islands, Favignana, Levanzo and Marettimo and two islets, Formica and Maraone.

The province of Trapani has a number of rivers, but most are not of notable size or importance, except for the Belice on the border of the province, and the Birgi, with a length of about 40 km. Other rivers include the torrential Modione, Mazaro, the Fiume, the Salemi and the Sossius, the latter of which flows into the Mediterranean Sea at the resort of Berbaro.

Natural lakes include the Gorghi Tondi and Preola, in the comune of Mazara del Vallo, and the Lago di Venere in Pantelleria. There are also three man-made lakes, Lago Rubino, created by a dam across the Cuddia River, which is part of the catchment area of the Birgi, at Lago Trinità in Castelvetrano, and the lake of the same name at the resort of Paceco. However, there is also a coastal lagoon, the Stagnone Lagoon, within a 2000-hectare reserve on the stretch of coast between Punta Alga and Cape San Teodoro, near Marsala, in an area which was once an important naval base and commercial for the Phoenicians. The waters are shallow and very salty, with marshland. The lagoon consists of four islands: Isola Longa Santa Maria, San Pantaleo and Schola.

The nearby island of Pantelleria, noted for its wine production, and the Aegadian Islands are also administratively a part of Trapani province.

== Government ==
=== Municipalities ===
The province has 25 municipalities:

- Alcamo
- Buseto Palizzolo
- Calatafimi-Segesta
- Campobello di Mazara
- Castellammare del Golfo
- Castelvetrano
- Custonaci
- Erice
- Favignana
- Gibellina
- Marsala
- Mazara del Vallo
- Misiliscemi
- Paceco
- Pantelleria
- Partanna
- Petrosino
- Poggioreale
- Salaparuta
- Salemi
- Santa Ninfa
- San Vito Lo Capo
- Trapani
- Valderice
- Vita

== Demographics ==
As of 2026, the population is 410,602, of which 49.5% are male, and 50.5% are female. Minors make up 14.8% of the population, and seniors make up 25.4%.

Historical population

Year	Pop.	±%
1861	213,211	—
1871	233,482	+9.5%
1881	279,889	+19.9%
1901	367,974	+31.5%
1911	364,813	−0.9%
1921	423,370	+16.1%
1931	370,501	−12.5%
1936	369,073	−0.4%

Year	Pop.	±%
1951	414,881	+12.4%
1961	427,672	+3.1%
1971	405,393	−5.2%
1981	420,865	+3.8%
1991	426,710	+1.4%
2001	425,121	−0.4%
2011	429,917	+1.1%
2021	417,220	−3.0%

Source: ISTAT

=== Immigration ===
As of 2025, immigrants make up 7.4% of the population. The 5 largest foreign countries of birth are Tunisia, Romania, Germany, Morocco, and Switzerland.

== Economy ==
The Province of Trapani is a major centre for viticulture in the Val di Mazara wine region.
