= Maria Santissima della Confusione =

The cult of Maria Santissima della Confusione began in the province of Trapani, and eventually spread in the near province of Palermo.

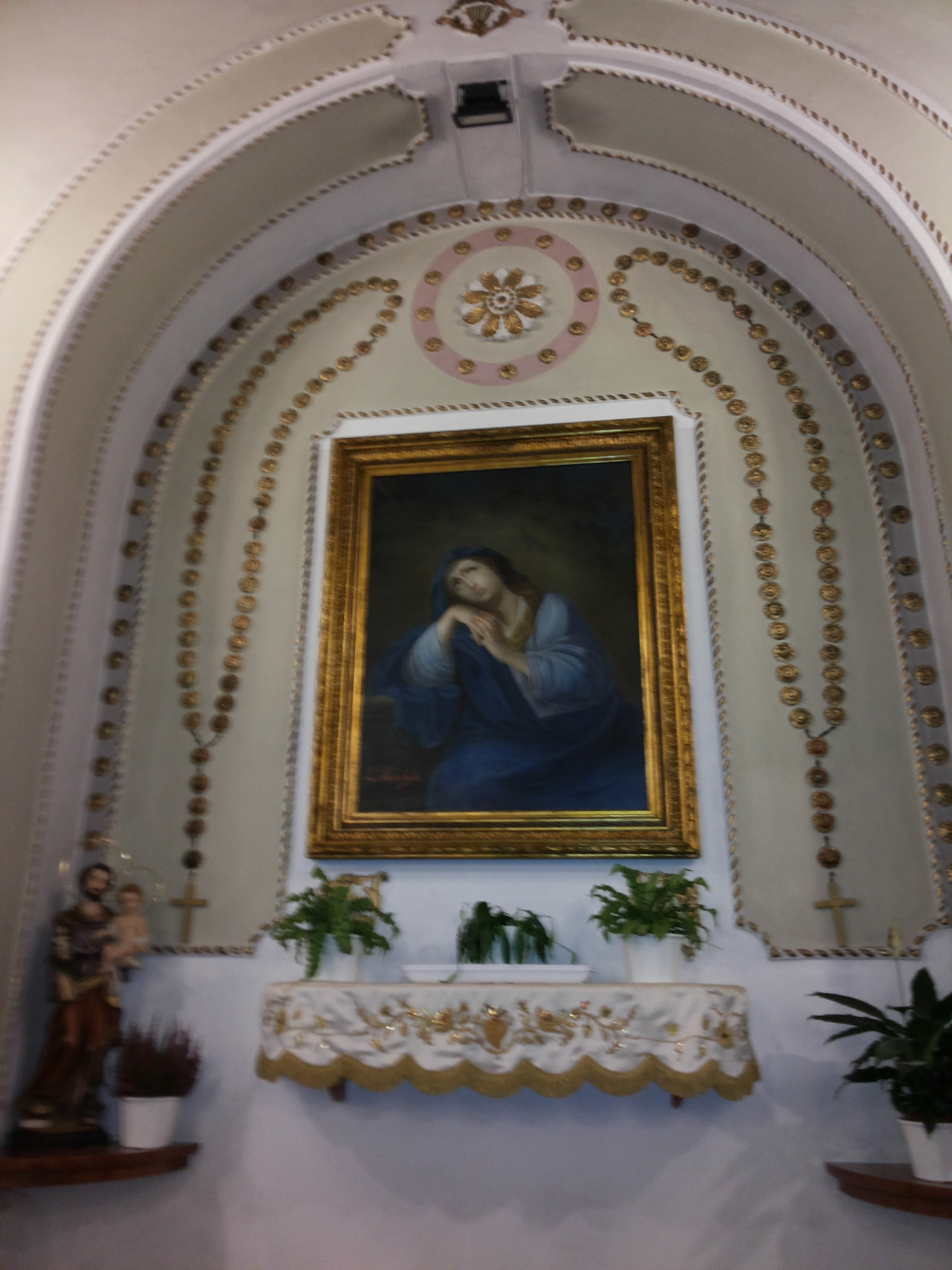
Madonna della Confusione, chiesa di Sant'Anna (Alcamo)

== Origin of the name ==
Maria Santissima della Confusione, that is venerated by the Friars Minor Capuchin of Salemi, is an oil painting realized in the 18th century by fra Felice da Sambuca; it is represented a Madonna in tears, with the symbols of the Passion of Jesus (the spear, the sponge with vinegar, the nails and the column of Jesus’ flagellation) around her.

The title Madonna della Confusione, refers to Mary, and expresses the state of consternation, of confusion and affliction faced with the painful death of her son. The term "Confused" derives from the Latin cum and fixus, then with-fixed, hanged with, but also from cum-flictus, con-flicted, from which derives the term "afflicted", that is confitto. Even in this she identifies herself with Jesus, cum-fusio, and for this reason she suffers with Him, (juxta crucem lacrimosa, in the Stabat Mater of Jacopone da Todi).

== Devotion ==
The devotion started and spread in the friaries of the Capuchins.

In Salemi the feast has taken place on the last Sunday of August for about three centuries: the painting of Madonna della Confusione is carried in procession along the town streets. Even if she is not the patroness of Salemi, she is venerated by people. The devotion to this Madonna is also present in Marsala, in the convent and in the Church of the Capuchins dedicated to Madonna della Confusione; the image of Our Lady of Sorrows has her head bent a little on the right, fingers crossed and eyes narrowed; in front of her, on a small table, there are the nails of crucifixion.

In Partanna, in the small Church dedicated to Saint Andrew the Apostle, next to the friary of Capuchins, there was a valuable painting of Madonna della Confusione which was stolen after that 1968 Belice earthquake had damaged the small Church. The image was similar to the other icons: Our Lady has the head bent on the left, fingers crossed on her chest and a mantle dropping down.

In Alcamo, in the Church of Saint Anne, there is a painting on canvas dated 1916, made by Leonardo Mirabile from Alcamo, representing Maria Santissima della Confusione. This picture is a copy of a painting made by Giuseppe Renda, dedicated to Our Lady of Sorrows, which was kept in the Church of Saint Mary of Jesus, and stolen in 1979.

There are also icons of Madonna della Confusione in the monasteries and ex monasteries of Capuchins of Erice, Mazara del Vallo, Trapani. In the province of Palermo: at Giuliana and at Palermo Boccadifalco, where the cult rose as the patron saint of pregnant women.

== See also ==
- Paceco
- Trapani
- Frati Minori Cappuccini

== Sources ==
- Salvatore Agueci: La Devozione alla Madonna della Confusione, con prefazione di Mons. Calogero Peri, vescovo di Caltagirone; Editrice ASLA, Palermo, 2015
- Carlo Cataldo, Guida storico-artistica dei beni culturali di Alcamo-Calatafimi-Castellammare del Golfo, Alcamo, Sarograf, 1982.
