= Benedetto Lo Monaco =

Italian actor (born 1956)

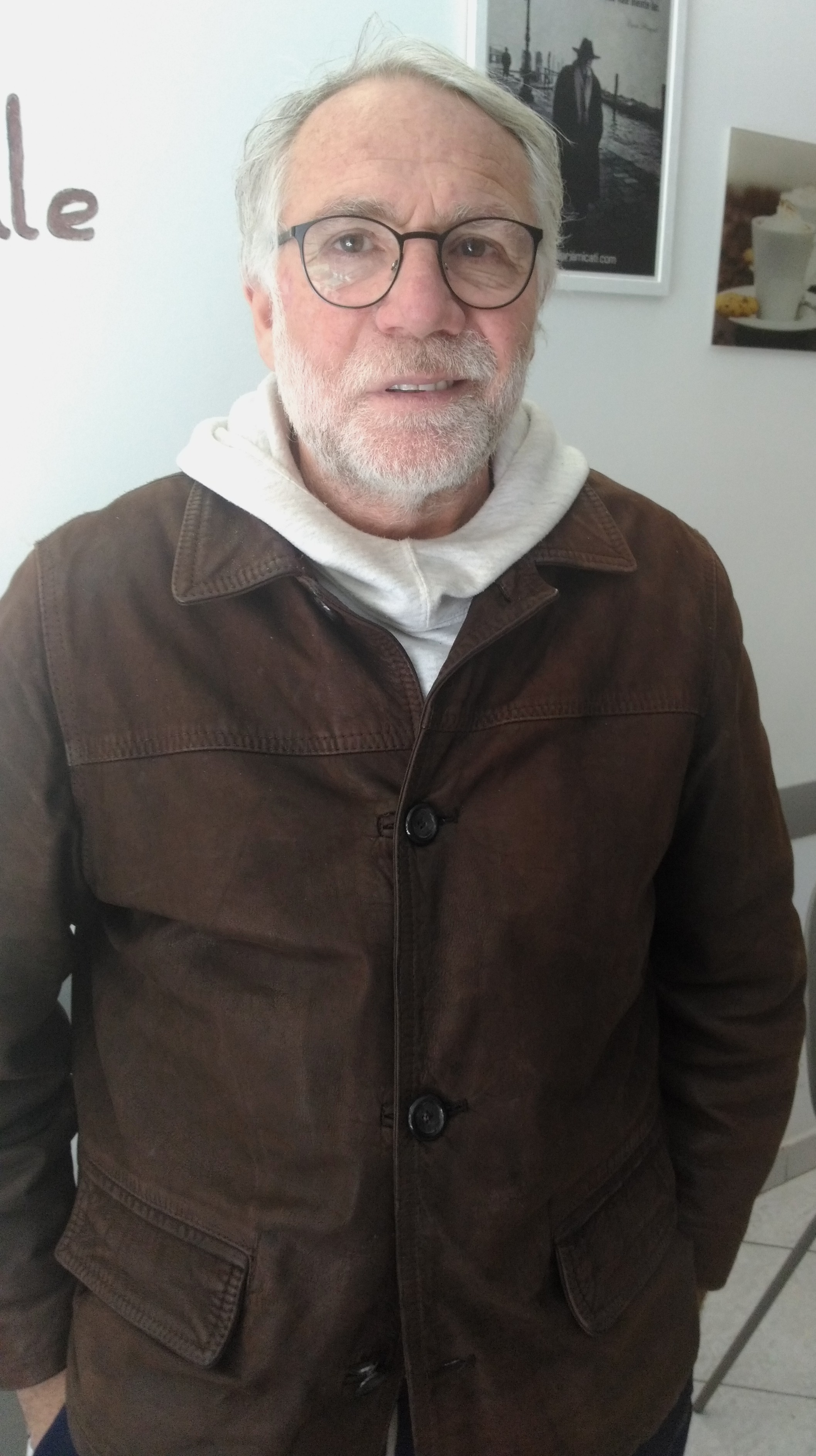
- Born: Benedetto Lo Monaco; 2 February 1956 (age 70); Alcamo, Sicily
- Occupation: Actor
- Years active: 1980–present

Benedetto Lo Monaco (born 2 February 1956) is an Italian actor, known for his work in many Italian movies.

== Biography ==
Lo Monaco started his artistic career when he was sixteen, when he took part in the Filodrammatica (amateur dramatic society) in the Church of Saint Anne in Alcamo. He is a well regarded actor, who has been in the field for 42 years. He has attended the following acting stages:

- 2005: Method Strasberg-Actors' studio of New York City directed by Marilyn Fried, at the Theatre Cielo d'Alcamo
- 2007: Method of theatre workshop led by Jean-Paul Denizon, at the Theatre Cielo d'Alcamo
- 2007: Method of theatre workshop led by the directors Giles Smith and Giorgio Serafini Prosperi

Lo Monaco has worked with several famous directors such as; Giuseppe Tornatore, Ricky Tognazzi and Salvo Bonaffini, and has also acted in the TV series I Cesaroni V with Claudio Amendola and Elena Sofia Ricci. In the film Pagate Fratelli, Benedetto acted among more well known actors, such as Tony Sperandeo and Gigi Burruano. Currently he has an enviable curriculum in the field of cinema. During his career he has won three festivals, including the Giffoni Film Festival in 2013.

He has also collaborated on a project with the Calandra & Calandra, a famous duo from Alcamo, who have a repertoire of folk music.

== Career ==
=== Theatre ===
- 1980 Gatta ci cova
- 1982 L'arte di Giufà
- 1983 La Buon Anima Di Mia Suocera
- 1987 A View from the Bridge
- 1995 Don Sasà Possotutto
- 1996 La Passione Di Cristo
- 2005 I Civitoti in Pretura
- 2006 Cavaliere Petagna
- 2007 Una storia Siciliana
- 2008 Fiat voluntas dei

=== Films ===
- 1989 Pummarò by Michele Placido
- 2007 Il dolce e l'amaro by Andrea Porporati, a mafioso
- 2008 Io, Don Giovanni by Carlos Saura, generico specializzato
- 2008 La Tomba Dei Giganti di Ricky Tognazzi, enologist
- 2008 Doppio gioco by Andrea Vicari e Riccando Rosce, Giufrè
- 2008 Il Divo by Paolo Sorrentino, Carabiniere
- 2008 Baaria by Giuseppe Tornatore, the Democrazia Cristiana secretary
- 2008 Viola di mare by Donatella Maiorca, Don Tano
- 2011 Pagate Fratelli by Salvatore Bonaffini, Father Carmelo, the protagonist
- 2012 La mafia alternativa, tra vita, morte e...miracoli by Nicola Barnaba, Michele
- 2013: Klepsidra by Salvo Onello, the hotel director
- 2013: Lo chiamavano nullità by Giovanni Cangelosi, balordo
- 2014: Leaves Of The Tree by Ante Novakovic, Cardinale
- 2014: Angeli by Salvatore Bonaffini, nonno
- 2015: Atto III by Francesco Zucchetti (got a prize at the Cici film festival a Castellammare del Golfo)
- 2015: Il santo senza parole by Tony Gangitano, eremita
- 2016: Oro e Piombo by Emiliano Ferrera, an outlaw
- 2018: Rocco Chinnici
- 2018: I nostri figli, Tv movie
- 2020: Rocco, Giuseppe
- 2022: L'infiltrato by Antonio Giaimo

=== Cortos ===
- 2009: Per un semplice gesto by Giovanni Spadone, protagonist
- 2009: Il letto by Accursio Graffeo, protagonist
- 2010: Artefatto in ospedale, by Andrea Clauser e Dario Lo Presti, infermiere professionale
- 2010: Random, by Emiliano Ferrera, coprotagonista
- 2012: La mafia alternativa, tra vita, morte e miracoli, by Michele Ainis
- 2013: Diverse esistenze, by Salvatore Bonaffini, the headmaster (winner at the Giffoni Film Festival)
- 2013: Troppo dentro il west by Diana e Andrea, the protagonist (winner of the prize Cici film festival)
- 2014: Capitano Biancamano, the protagonist (winner of two prizes at the Cici film festival and Corto Ferrara)
- 2014: Il viaggio della vita, the priest
- 2016: Un pugno di sabbia, directed by Salvo Bonaffini (winner of the "Castro Film Festival Puglia" as the Best Subject, and selected at the Borgia Film Festival 2017
- 2017: Prometta mi, grandfather
- 2020: Rocco, Giuseppe

=== TV Fiction ===
- 2005 Cefalonia by Riccardo Milani, lieutenant colonel
- 2005 Montalbano by Alberto Sironii
- 2007 Il Generale dalla Chiesa by Giorgio Capitani, a magistrate
- 2008 Paolo VI by Fabrizio Costa, a nobleman
- 2008 Doppio gioco by Lazzaretti and Matteo Lena, Giufrè
- 2008 Caso Mattei by Giorgio Capitani, the Sicilian man
- 2011: I Cesaroni (a judge)

=== Commercials ===
- 1995 Sport and housewares sectors, Marcello Grimaudo (on Alpa 1)

=== Video clips ===
- 2012: Scotula scotula (del duo Calandra&Calandra), the co-protagonist
- 2013: Matrimonio tirituppi e tappi (del duo Calandra&Calandra), the protagonist

=== Sitcom ===
2011 "Le famiglie Caserecce" directed by Philippe Giangreco, the protagonist

=== Radio ===
Speaker at Radio Alcamo Centrale

=== Spots ===
- 2014: Bum Bum – Bathfoam
- 2015: Deliziosa, a commercial on a cheese made in Apulia (Canale5 and RAI).

== Personal life ==
Benedetto Lo Monaco is a regional champion of skating. His hobbies include racing, breeding animals, and music. Lo Monaco is also an experienced cook and butcher.

== See also ==
- Giacomo Romano Davare
- Compagnia Piccolo Teatro (Alcamo)
- Church of Saint Anne (Alcamo)
- I Cesaroni

== Sources ==
- "BENEDETTO LO MONACO : UN ORGOGLIO SICILIANO | RACCONTAMI DI TE". raccontamidite.altervista.org. 16 May 2015.
- "Benedetto Lo Monaco -". studiofidemi.it.
- "Benedetto Lo Monaco". IMDb.
- "About Me – RBCasting". rbcasting.com.
- "Deliziosa, lo spot che porta Benedetto Lo Monaco sulle reti nazionali | Alqamah". alqamah.it. 30 October 2015.
- ""Oro e Piombo" un'altra "avventura" per l'attore alcamese Benedetto Lo Monaco | Alqamah". alqamah.it. 6 November 2016.
- "Benedetto Lo Monaco: un attore alcamese | Alqamah". alqamah.it. 14 February 2012.
