= Giacomo Romano Davare =

Italian writer and theatre director

Giacomo Romano Davare (born 2 July 1945 in Alcamo) is an Italian writer, actor, stage director and teacher.

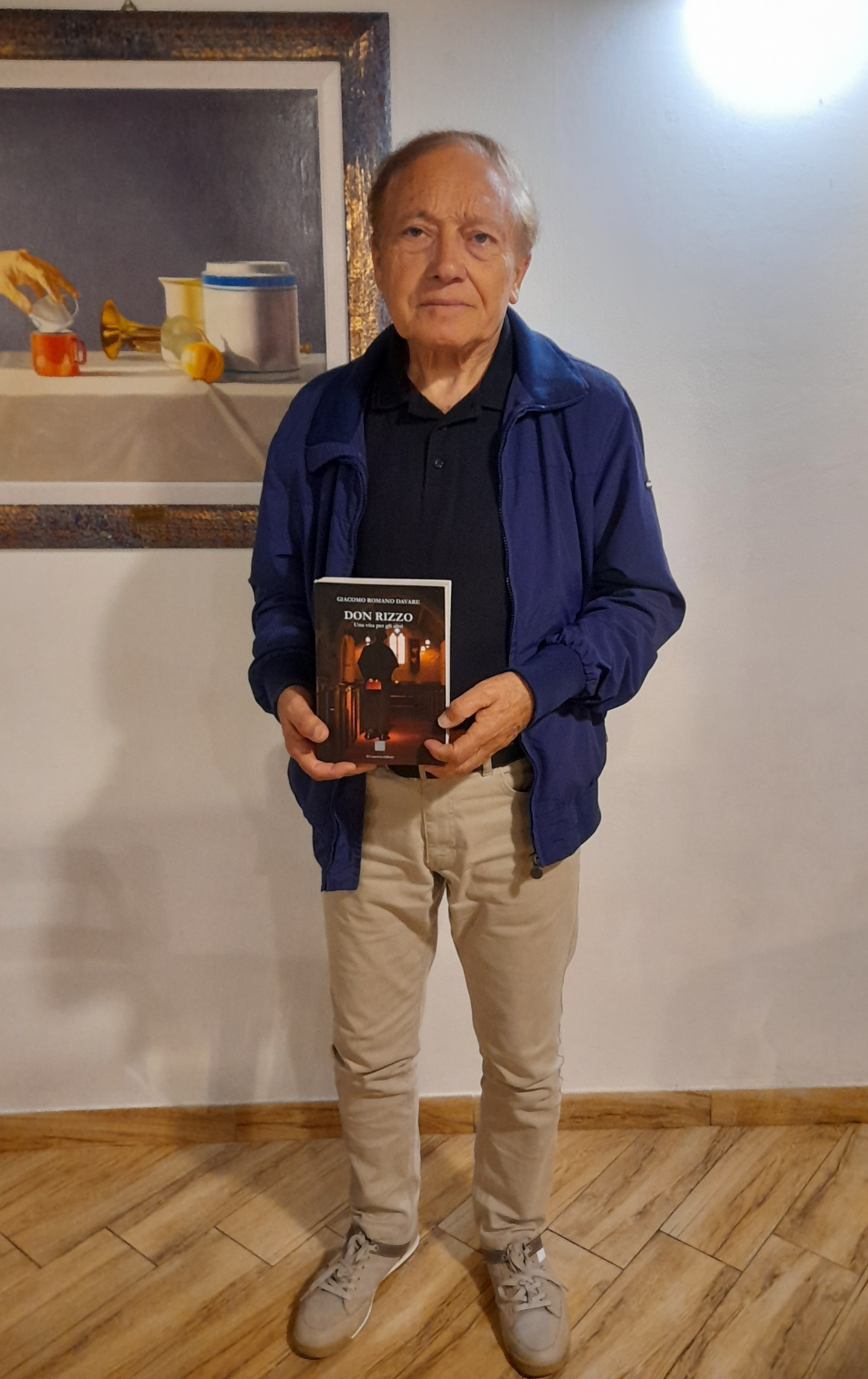
Davare and his last novel

== Biography ==
Davare was born in Alcamo, in the province of Trapani in 1945; he is an actor, stage director, writer, lyricist, composer and songwriter. After getting the high school diploma, he has been navigating worldwide for three years as a sea captain; later he graduated in Economy and Commerce, qualifying as a certified accountant.

After winning a competition for teaching, he taught Applied Mathematics in Commercial Technical Institutes, first in Alcamo, then in Lecco and finally in Morbegno, in the province of Sondrio; later he became a headmaster in high schools.

In 1973, with a literary article on Il Secolo d'Italia, he started a long series of publications which included novels, poems, essays and various dramas, works that are catalogued in national libraries and in those of theatrical companies in Europe, United States and Australia; later he published article in different magazines and newspapers, such as Il Giornale di Sicilia, Romagna, Rivista Teatro, Corriere della Valtellina, Cultura di destra. Finally, he collaborated with University of Milano-Bicocca for Italian teachers traineeship (TFA).

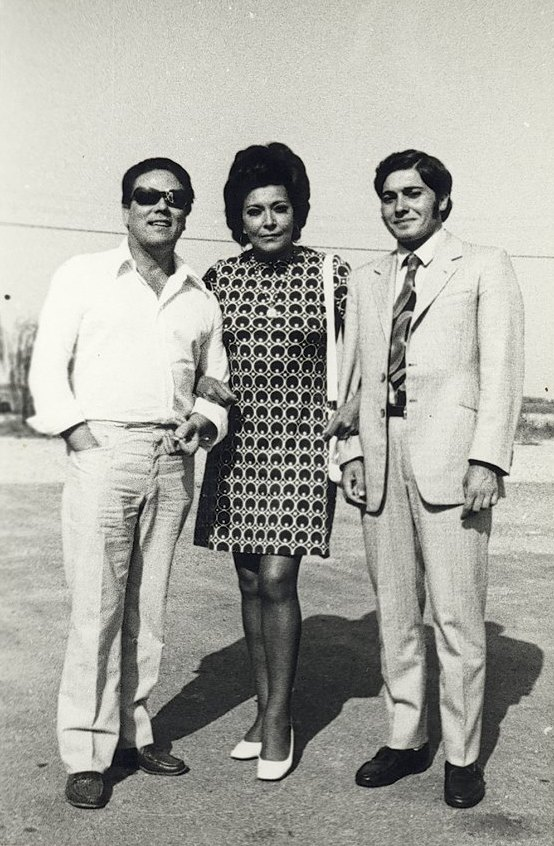
Davare con Nilla Pizzi e Redento Coslovi, 1974

In 1976, thanks to his artistic experience with Filodrammatica in the Church of Saint Anne (Alcamo), he founded Piccolo Teatro di Alcamo; after his transfer in Lombardy, he has been the artistic director of Compagnia Piccolo Teatro delle Valli of Morbegno (Sondrio) since 1983. He has directed more than one hundred plays for Piccolo Teatro of Alcamo and Piccolo Teatro delle Valli of Sondrio, with a greater propensity for classical authors like Sophocles, Shakespeare, Molière, Goldoni, Pirandello, Cechov, Ibsen, T. Wilder, T.S. Eliot and Arthur Miller. He has been politically committed, as he first supported the M.S.I.(Italian Social Movement) and later A.N. National Alliance (Italy), where he covered the office of provincial president; he was an administrator in the province of Trapani and Sondrio, and also a member of the BIM (Bacino imbrifero montano) of Sondrio.

=== Prizes and acknowledgments ===
Davare has won, or been mentioned, in various Italian literary contests:

- Premio Federico II, Palermo 1970
- Premio Martin Luther King, Civitavecchia 1977
- Premio Giacomo Arnò, Naples, 1979
- Fragmenta d'oro for theatre, Rome 1985
- Carlo Alianello for edited poetry, Sibari 1989
- Premio nazionale Histonium for narrative, Vasto 2003
- "Premio migliore regia" at the theatre contest of San Costantino Calabro for the play "Tre sull'altalena" by Lunari (agosto 2006)
- Premio Speciale Gatal (2011) for his theatrical activity
- Ghitakos for Essays, Athens 2013
- Premi Letterari "N. Giordano Bruno – XXII edition" and "Amici della Sapienza – Speciale Scuola XVIII edition", December 2014 (as Meritorius for culture, art, tourism and solidarity)
- Special Mention at Premio Letterario Casentino 2016
- Fifth classified at "Premio Internazionale Michelangelo Buonarroti", Serravezza 2016
- Prize of merit assigned by Premio letterario internazionale Montefiore (7th edition) for his essay "Chi era Enrico IV?" (September 2017)
- Finalist at Premio Internazionale Michelangelo Buonarroti 3rd edition, Serravezza November 2017
- International Prize (Premio internazionale) Talenti Vesuviani: assigned PREMIO SPECIALE LEGALITA (Naples, 2017)
- Honorable Mention at the 2nd Premio Artistico-letterario Internazionale al femminile "Maria Cumani Quasimodo" (2018)
- Mention of highest literary merit assigned by the Associazione Artistica Culturale "Accademia degli Artisti", Premio Letterario internazionale Golden Books Awards 2018 in collaboration with Umberto Soletti editor, 19 May 2018
- Premio Internazionale Michelangelo Buonarroti 4th edition: Diploma d'onore con menzione d'onore (Single Poems section), Forte dei Marmi, November 2018
- Premio Internazionale Michelangelo Buonarroti 4th edition: Diploma d'onore con menzione d'onore (Tales section) with the work Le Voci nel Camino), Forte dei Marmi, November 2018
- Finalist (with a special mention) at the 3rd edition of Concorso Nazionale Letterario "Un fiorino d'Inverno-Gli Editi" (Monterotondo, 23 February 2019)
- Finalist at Concorso Tra un fiore colto e l'altro donato, March 2019
- Merit Diploma by the Associazione Artistica Culturale "Accademia degli Artisti", Premio Letterario internazionale Golden Books Awards 2018 (in collaborazione con Umberto Soletti editore), 15 April 2019
- 3rd classified: Premio Internazionale M.Cumani Quasimodo Centro Europeo Toscolano, 12 May 2019 (for Essays and degree thesis)
- Honorable Mention at Premio Letterario Nazionale Città di Ascoli Piceno (1st Edition, Poetry): 7 September 2019
- Finalist at the 3rd Concorso CET (Centro Europeo di Toscolano, Scuola Autori di Mogol), 23 November 2019
- 3º classificato at the 5th Premio Internazionale S.Quasimodo, Premio Speciale sez.Faretra, Centro Europeo Toscolano, 11 January 2020
- Premio della Critica narrativa edita al Concorso Nazionale di Poesia e Narrativa Talenti Vesuviani (14th edition), (San Giorgio a Cremano, Naples, 13 December 2020);
- 1º Premio Internazionale Dostoevskij 2020:
  - 1st classified (premio Faretra) (section edited Novels) with the novel Il Ferro di Cavallo;
  - 2nd classified (section Poetry and Narrative) with the text Drammi;
  - 3rd classified (section unedited novels) with Le due Isole;
- 2º classified at Premio Letterario Fortuna (7th edition) in the Narrative Section, Bari 5 September 2021;
- Special Prize, Section Historical Novel, with Il Ferro di Cavallo in the 9th edition of the International Contest for Poetry and Narrative Le Grazie Porto Venere la Baia dell’Arte, organized by the Association ‘Il Volo dell’Arte’ (3 October 2021).
- Premio La Ginestra di Firenze: winner for unpublished Essays, 2022
- Premio Intercontinentale di Arte Letteraria Le Nove Muse: Special Prize of Merit for the novel Il Sole sorgerà ancora, Naples, 10 June 2023.
- Premio Luigi Pirandello (Accademia Internazionale il Convivio): honorable mention for the novel Don Rizzo, il prete solidale, Giardini Naxos, September 2023.
- Premio La Ginestra di Firenze 2024 (narrativa edita): honorable mention from the Jury for the novel il Sole sorgerà ancora.
- Premio Letterario Casentino 2024; special prize of the Jury fo the unpublished la narrative.
- Premio Borghese for the unpublished essay Le radici del Teatro Contemporaneo. (2024)
- Premio Fortuna 2024 (second classified) Non-fiction, for the essay Il secolo del Teatro.
- 2nd classified at the Premio Internazionale La Ginestra for the novel Il soffio dell'Oceano, new edition of the Il capitano di Lungo Corso (June 2025).
- Honor Mention at the Premio letterario Le Pietre di Anuraria for the essay "IL SECOLO DEL TEATRO"; April 2026.
- Winner of the Concorso Nazionale di Poesia e Narrativa Talenti Vesuviani (XX edition), (San Giorgio a Cremano, for the novel Don Rizzo, una vita per gli altri; October 2026);
- 1° classified at the Premio Internazionale Michelangelo Buonarroti 9ª edition (Sezione Narrativa), for the novel Don Rizzo, una vita per gli altri; November 2026);
- Member of Accademia Ferdinandea of Catania.
- Knight of the International Confederation Knights Crusader of Malta (2003)

=== Works ===
- Il potere e la croce: a trilogy; Palermo: Thule, 1999
- Bruto figlio di Cesare (a drama, with an introduction by Gennaro Malgieri); Palermo: Thule, 1977
- Anche il silenzio tace: poems; Palermo: Thule, 1981
- Il buco grigio (an essay-enquiry on the essence of thought through the analysis of the logical circuits of our mind); Firenze libri, 1989
- Guida alla didattica del «Far teatro»; Editore: Nuovi Autori; 1990, Genere: arti ricreative. spettacolo. sport
- Più forte che la rivoluzione; Palermo: Thule, 19..
- Eolia (a novel on navigation); Firenze: L'Autore Libri, 1993
- L'inverno passerà presto: a drama in 2 acts and 4 scenes; translated in Russian by Monica Ferrante, music by Fausto Cannone, introduction by Teresa Rizzo, afterword by Tommaso Romano; Milan; Nuovi Autori, 1994
- Via Mazzini: a comedy in three acts; Palermo: Thule, 1997
- Ciullo d'Alcamo: a historical drama in 2 acts and 5 scenes (with an introduction by Giuseppe Cottone); Palermo: Thule, 1998
- Dietro il cancello: a drama in 2 acts; Palermo: Thule, 1999
- 1:Il sangue dei martiri: a historical drama in 2 acts; Palermo: Thule, 1999 (Is a part of: Il potere e la croce, trilogy)
- L'ala spezzata del destino; Pescara: Tracce, 2002
- Il favo delle api: a fable in 2 acts with songs; Palermo: Thule, 2003
- L'onore di Bice: giallo vergognosamente comico in due atti, un prologo e un'anteprima; Palermo: Thule, 2005
- Il teatro dell'anima: storia della drammaturgia moderna nell'esperienza di alcuni protagonisti, by Giacomo Romano Davare and Manuel Davare; Firenze: Atheneum, 2007
- Il teatro dell'anima. Educare al teatro, educare con il teatro; Editore: Firenze Atheneum, Collana: Collezione Oxenford, 2007
- Anima profonda: articoli e saggi critici (1973–2002) di Giacomo Romano Davare; with an introductive text by Tommaso Romano: Parola creativa e azione teatrale nell'opera di Giacomo Romano Davare; Palermo: Thule, 2010
- Le voci nel camino (stories); Edizioni L'Autore Libri Firenze, 2011
- Torna a volare libero, gabbiano: a drama in 2 acts; Palermo: Thule, 2011
- Prima che il treno passi, a drama
- Molière didattico: translations of the comedies Le Saccenti and IL Tartufo; Palermo: Thule, 2013
- Teatro: Maschera e specchio della civiltà occidentale; Ed. Firenze Atheneum; Collana: Collezione Oxenford, 2014
- Le interrelazioni sociali nel teatro, Rivista Teatro, Milan
- Il potere e l'anima: a trilogy of Giacomo Romano Davare; music by Fausto Cannone; Palermo: Thule, 2014
- Le fiabe teatrali: dove vai Cherry Brown; L'uccellino blu; Palermo: Thule, 2015
- Chi era Enrico Quarto? Europa Edizioni Roma; Collana: Edificare universi, 2015
- Il professore e il magistrato; a novel. Europa Edizioni, Collana: Edificare universi, 2017
- Il ferro di cavallo; a novel. Europa Edizioni, Collana: Edificare universi, 2020
- Strani incroci della vita: le due isole e il senso della vita; Villanova di Guidonia, Aletti editore, 2021
- Il sole sorgerà ancora; a novel; Villanova di Guidonia, Aletti editore, 2022
- Il secolo del teatro (fra Innovazione e Tradizione); Helicon edizioni; 2023

== See also ==
- Benedetto Lo Monaco
- Alcamo
- Morbegno
- Italian Social Movement

== Sources ==
- Davare, Giacomo Romano (2017). Il professore e il magistrato p.380. Roma: Europa edizioni.
- "ENTRA NEL 30° ANNO LA STORIA DEL PICCOLO TEATRO DELLE VALLI DI MORBEGNO".
- "Il professore e il magistrato – Giacomo Romano Davare". Archived from the original on 1 December 2017.
- "Davare Giacomo Romano Libri".
- "Davare, Giacomo Romano". Archived from the original on 1 December 2017.
- "5° classificato ex aequo Giacomo Romano Davare".
- "Premio letterario internazionale Montefiore".
- ""Erano pure figli miei" di Arthur Miller secondo Giacomo Romano Davare". YouTube. 9 April 2014.
