= Arcangelo Placenza da Calatafimi =

Italian Franciscan Friar and Preacher

Arcangelo Placenza da Calatafimi (Calatafimi, 1390 – Alcamo, 24 luglio 1460) was an Italian Franciscan Friar and Preacher: today he is venerated as Blessed by the Catholic Church.

== Biography ==
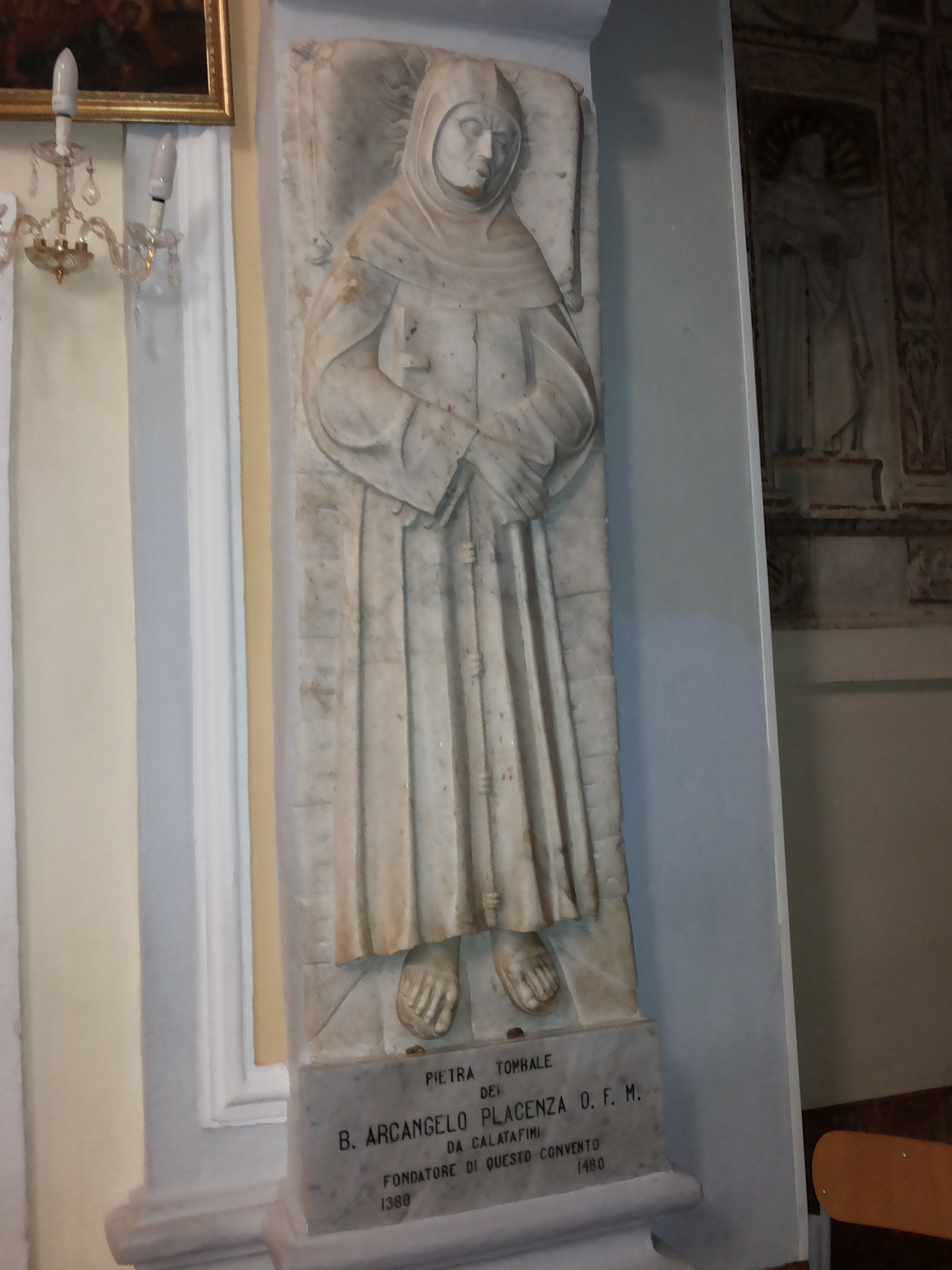
The Blessed Arcangelo's tombstone

Born at Calatafimi, (province and Diocese of Trapani), at about 1390 in the local noble family of the Placenza, he left his paternal home and went to live in a cave, near the church of Santa Maria del Giubino, where we experienced frequent apparitions of the Virgin, who would appear him over a cypress while he was praying.

After the news of the apparitions and miracles spread, the place became increasingly frequented by believers, and relatives tried to persuade him to give up his intentions. In search of meditation, Arcangelo moved to Alcamo, where he cared for sick people in the old hospital of Sant'Antonio, which he restored after a period of neglect. In his free time he retired in a cave near the present Chiesa di Santa Maria di Gesù (Alcamo) to pray and do penitence.

After the suppression of hermits in Sicily by Pope Martino V, he became a friar of the Minor Order of Observants in Palermo, of the convent of Santa Maria di Gesù.

After becoming a priest, the Blessed Matteo Guimerà from Agrigento, his immediate superior, gave him the right to open new convents: Arcangelo returned to the hospital of Sant'Antonio in Alcamo, to open a convent. He was also elected provincial Vicar of his order and devoted himself to preaching.

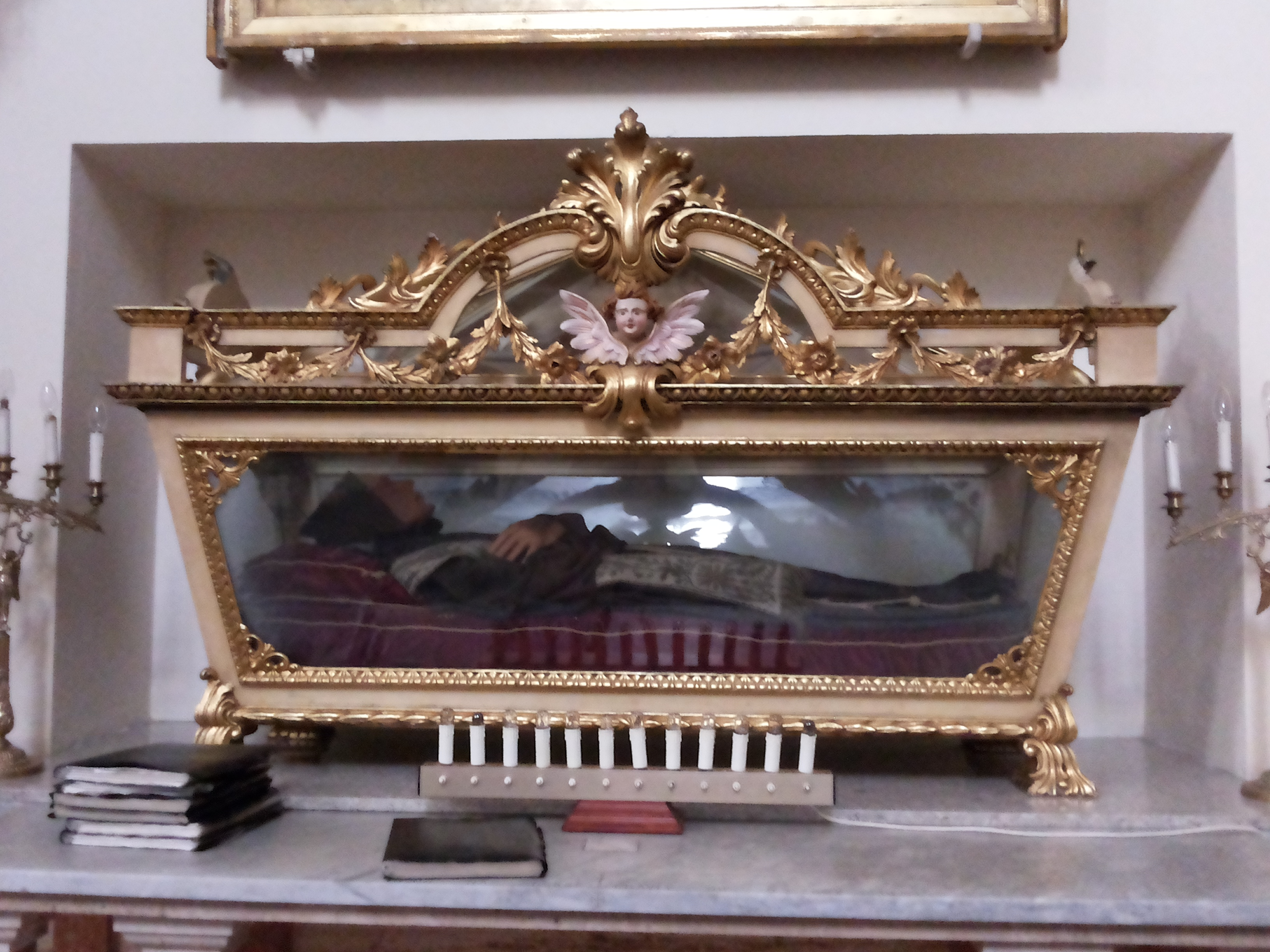
Urn with the mortal remains of the Blessed Arcangelo Placenza from Calatafimi, kept inside the Church of Saint Mary of Jesus in Alcamo.

He lived in the convent of Santa Maria di Gesù in Alcamo until his death on 24 July 1460. His body is kept in an ebony urn placed above the altar of Saint Conrad, in the Chiesa di Santa Maria di Gesù.

Pope Gregorio XVI proclaimed him blessed, thanks to the various miracles attributed to him, on 9 September 1836.

== See also ==
- Mariano da Alcamo
- Alcamo
- Church of Saint Mary of Jesus

== Sources ==
- Calia, Roberto (2001). Il beato Arcangelo Placenza da Calatafimi: itinerario storico, biografico, religioso, letterario. Alcamo: Sarograf.
- "santibeati".
- Mirabella, Francesco Maria (1876). Cenni degli alcamesi rinomati in lettere, arti, armi e santità. Alcamo: tip. Gaetano Surdi.
