= Giuliana =

- Pronunciation: Italian: [dʒuˈljaːna]
- Gender: Female

Origin
- Origin: Italy
- Meaning: Youthful, graceful

Other names
- Related names: Julie, Juliana (disambiguation), Giulia (disambiguation), Julia, Anna, Hannah, Giuliano

Giuliana is an Italian language given name ultimately derived from the Latin Iuliana, the feminine form of Iulianus. The name is also often thought to be a combination of Julia (Giulia) and Anna.

== Given name ==
- Blessed Giuliana of Collalto (c.1186–1262), Italian Benedictine nun
- Giuliana Bruno, Italian-American scholar
- Giuliana Camerino (1920–2010), Italian fashion designer
- Giuliana Corrales (born 2000), Paraguayan beach volleyball player
- Giuliana Cusnier (born 2002), Puerto Rican rhythmic gymnast
- Giuliana Farfalla (born 1996), German model
- Giuliana Furci (born 1978), Chilean-British-Italian mycologist
- Giuliana González (born 2002), Argentine footballer
- Giuliana Jakobeit (born 1976), German voice actress
- Giuliana Minuzzo (1931–2020), Italian alpine skier
- Giuliana Nenni (1911–2002), Italian journalist and politician
- Giuliana Olmos (born 1993), Mexican tennis player
- Giuliana Póveda (born 2001), Peruvian para-badminton player
- Giuliana Rancic (born 1974), Italian-American television personality
