= Calatafimi-Segesta =

- Comune
- Comune di Calatafimi-Segesta
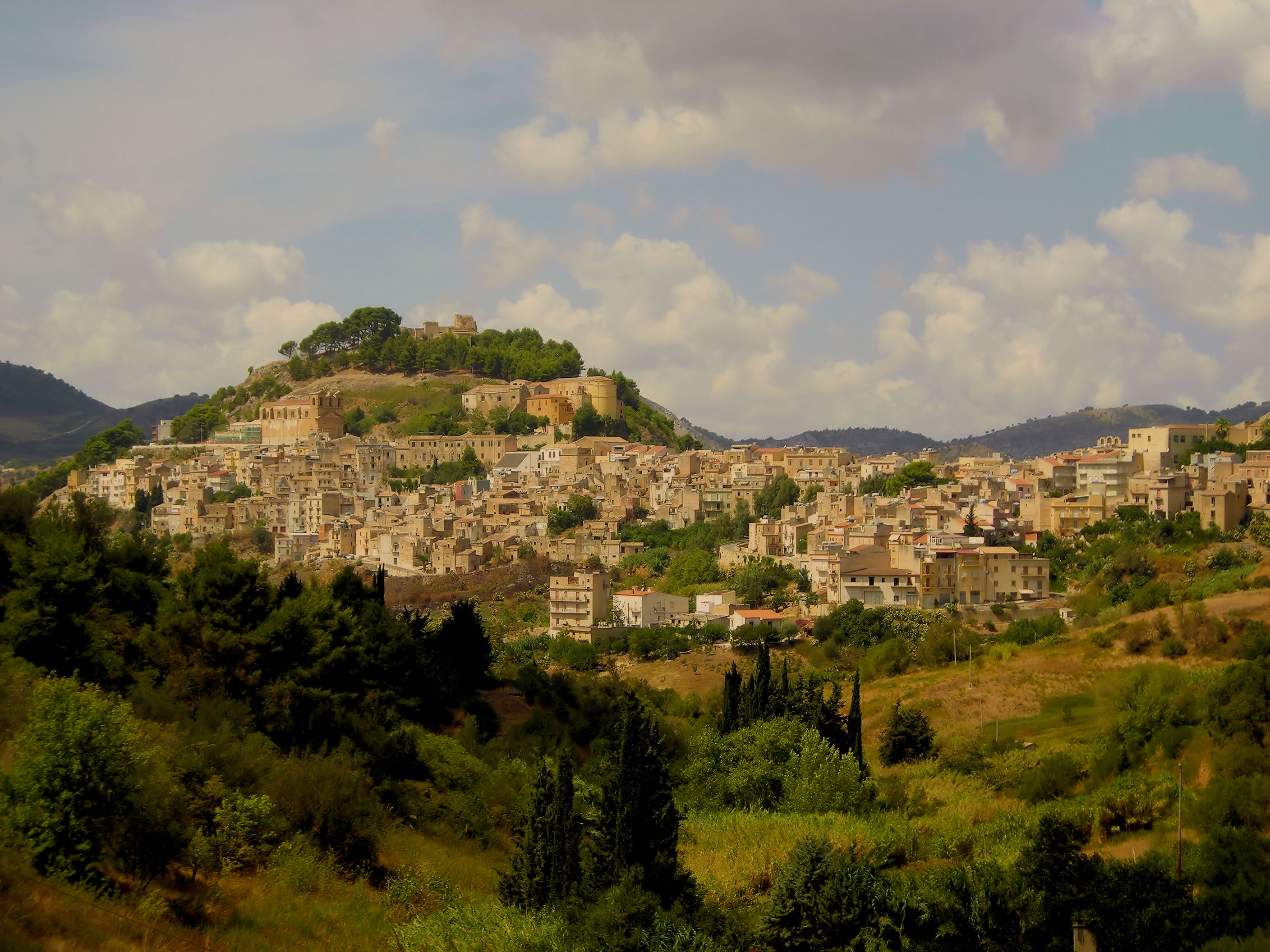

- Coat of arms

- Location within Italy Location within Sicily
- Coordinates: 37°54′N 12°51′E
- Country: Italy
- Region: Sicily
- Province: Trapani (TP)
- Frazioni: Sasi

Government
  - Mayor: Vito Sciortino

Area
  - Total: 154.86 km^{2} (59.79 sq mi)
- Elevation: 338 m (1,109 ft)

Population (2025)
  - Total: 6,019
  - Density: 38.87/km^{2} (100.7/sq mi)
- Demonym: Calatafimesi
- Time zone: UTC+1 (CET)
  - Summer (DST): UTC+2 (CEST)
- Postal code: 91013
- Dialing code: 0924
- Patron saint: Most Holy Crucifix and Madonna of Giubino
- Saint day: 3 May
- Website: Official website

Calatafimi-Segesta, commonly known as simply Calatafimi, is a comune in the province of Trapani in the Italian region of Sicily. It has 6,019 inhabitants.

The full name of the municipality was created in 1997 and is meant to highlight the presence within its territory of the 5th century BC Doric temple of Segesta, widely regarded as one of the most intact of its type. Adjoining the temple, on a nearby hilltop, there is a 2nd-century Roman amphitheater.

== History ==
The town developed during the age of the Muslim emirate of Sicily, when it was known as Qalʿat Fīmī (قلعة فيمي), referring to the defensive castle overlooking the town, now partially restored from ruins. One hypothesis for the castle's name derives it from Castrum Phimes – a stronghold protecting the territory of a Roman period nobleman mentioned by Cicero, Diocles Phimes. Another hypothesis derives it from "Castle of Euphemius", possibly referring to the 5th-century Byzantine patriarch by that name or, more likely, to the 9th-century Byzantine commander, who brought Muslim troops to Sicily in 827, helping begin the Muslim conquest of Sicily.

Calatafimi's part of Sicily was one of the first to be occupied by the Aghlabids from Ifriqiya in their conquest of the island, and was one of the last centres of Islamic culture after the end of the Norman rule. The excavations near Segesta have revealed a 12th-century Islamic necropolis and mosque. There are also references to an Islamic-period town called Calathamet (Qalʿat al-Ḥamma, قلعة الحمّة), on the border of the territories of Calatafimi and Castellammare del Golfo, possibly equating the modern Terme Segestane.

From 1336 until 1860, Calatafimi was a feudal territory under Habsburg and Spanish nobles, despite three attempts to regain an independent status (in 1399, 1412 and 1802).

It was on a hill near Calatafimi, called Pianto Romano, that, in 1860, Giuseppe Garibaldi and his Mille first encountered the troops of the Bourbons on a battlefield (see the Battle of Calatafimi). This was the first significant battle for the Italian unification (or Risorgimento) and it was in this battle that Garibaldi was said to have uttered the famous battle cry: "Here we make Italy, or we die" (in Italian "Qui si fa l'Italia, o si muore"). A memorial, in the form of large stone obelisk containing an ossuary of the remains of those fallen in the battle, currently marks the hilltop.

In his later life, the 19th-century English novelist Samuel Butler made annual trips to Calatafimi, and a street of the town was named after him. Summer theatres is held in the Roman amphitheatre at Segesta every other year. A new archaeological museum is being created that will show findings from the Segesta archaeological excavations.

== Demographics ==
Historical population
Year	Pop.	±%
1861	8,690	—
1871	9,480	+9.1%
1881	10,349	+9.2%
1901	11,374	+9.9%
1911	10,486	−7.8%
1921	10,487	+0.0%
1931	10,942	+4.3%
1936	11,484	+5.0%
1951	11,654	+1.5%
1961	10,775	−7.5%
1971	8,488	−21.2%
1981	8,168	−3.8%
1991	7,636	−6.5%
2001	7,496	−1.8%
2011	6,938	−7.4%
2021	6,243	−10.0%
Source: ISTAT

In 1901 the population of Calatafimi was recorded as 11,374. Subsequent major emigrations due to poverty and unemployment kept the number from growing and, after 1950, the population began decreasing. Prior to 1900, the main destination was Tunisia, later it was the United States and Argentina.

After World War II, Canada and Australia became destinations, as did Germany and Great Britain and the major cities of the Italian mainland. As of 2025 there are 6,019 permanent inhabitants, although the physical size of the town had grown, as families occupied larger residences. Following severe damage in the 1968 Belice Valley earthquake, a new section of town, Sasi, was built on former farmlands about 3 kilometres (1.9 mi) from the old town centre.

== Sights ==
=== Civil buildings and sites ===
==== Segesta ====
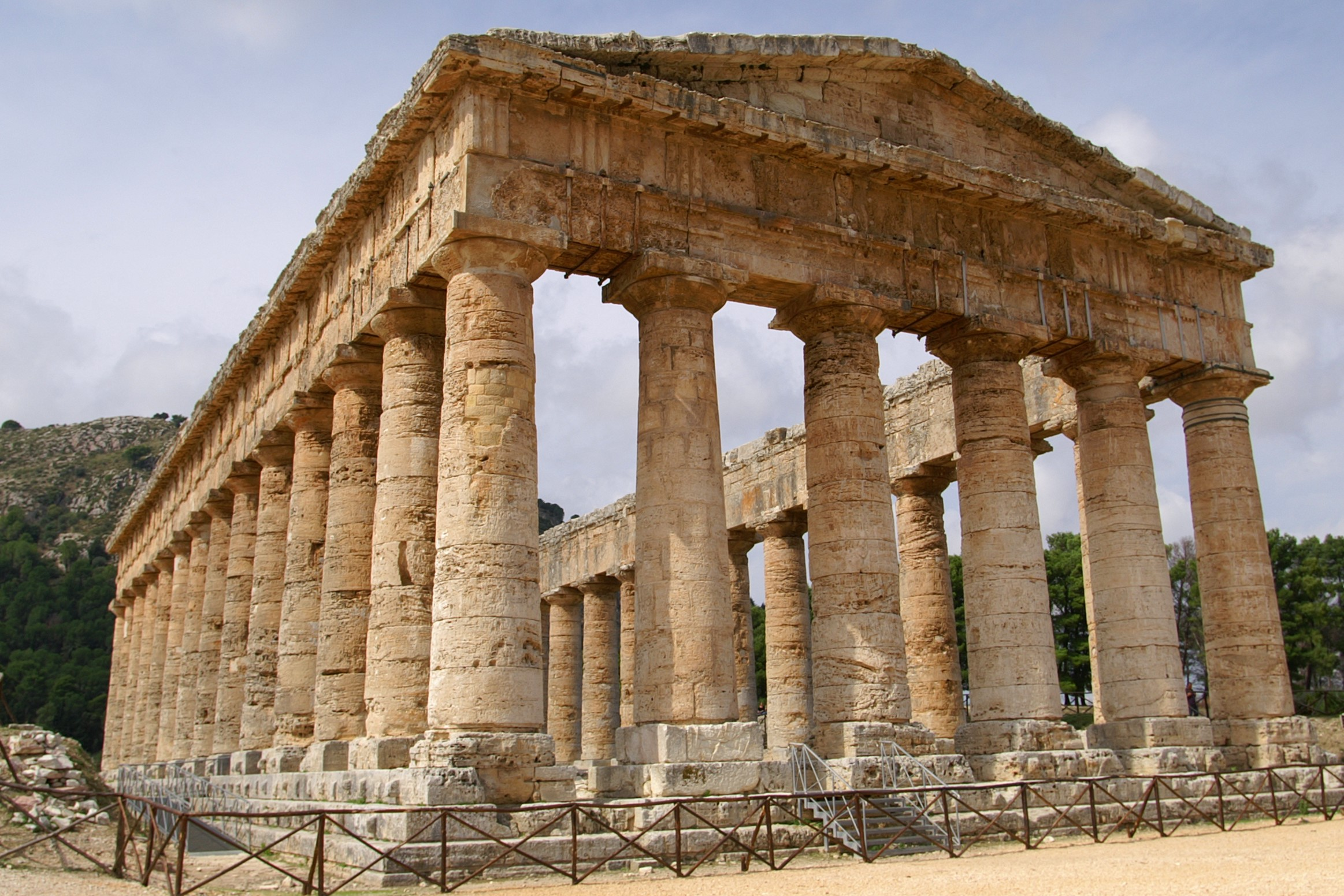
Temple of Segesta

It is an archeological site including an unfinished Doric temple built between 430 and 420 BCE, 61 metres long and 26 wide. It is also without a roof: scholars are in disagreement as to whether the temple was deliberately planned this way.

Other sights include an amphitheatre, also built by the Greeks at about 400 BC, and a sanctuary.

==== Pianto Romano ====
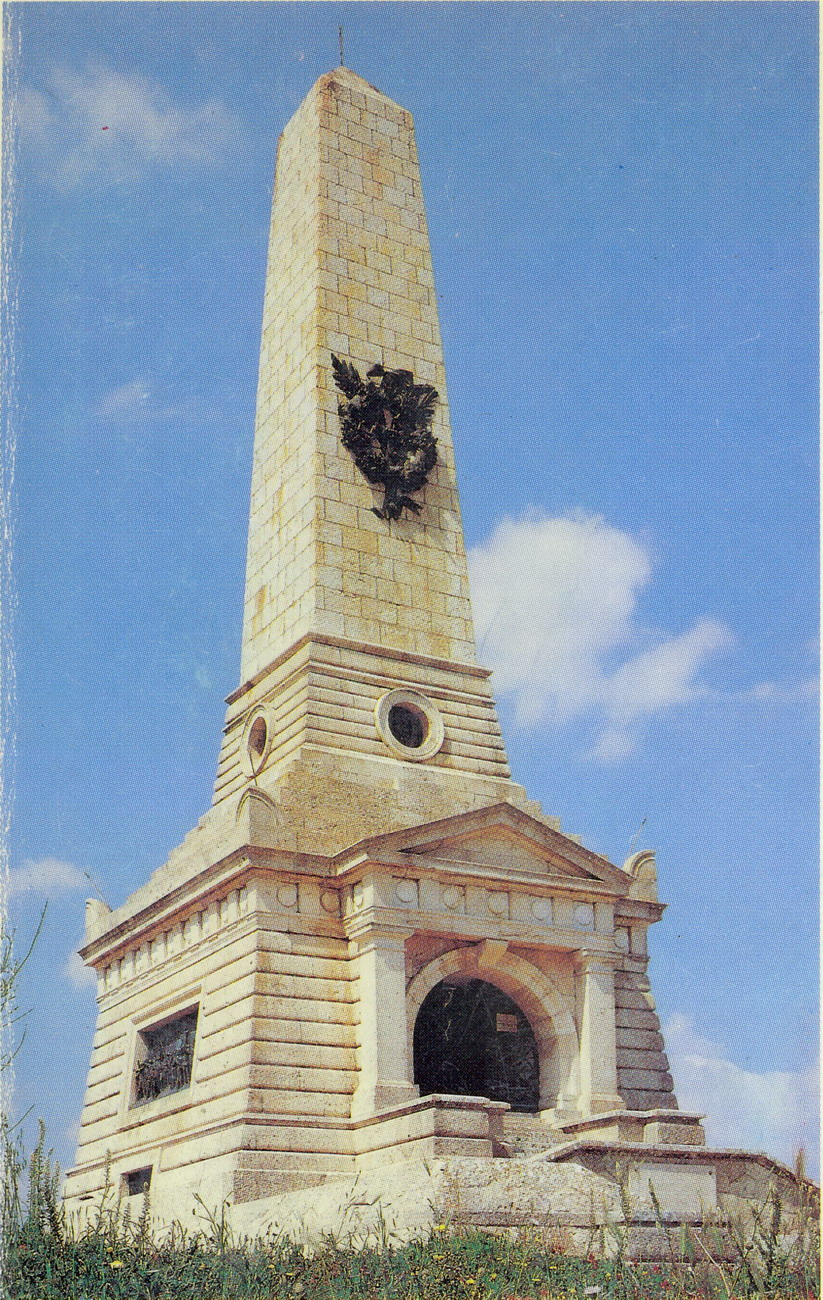
Pianto Romano, the memorial of the battle of Calatafimi

The mausoleum of Pianto Romano is situated on a hill a few kilometres southwest of the town of Calatafimi. It is an ossuary shrine which holds the remains of those who died, from either side, in the Battle of Calatafimi between the Thousand and the Sicilian army (1860). Designed by the architect Enrico Basile in a neoclassical style, and surmounted by an obelisk, it was inaugurated on 15 May 1892.

==== Castle Eufemio ====
A typical example of Norman-Hohenstaufen defensive architecture, it is located on a hill dominating the town. There are written documents about it only since the middle of the 12th century when Muhammad al-Idrisi, an Arab traveller and geographer, describes it as “an ancient and primitive with a populated village”. In the middle of the 12th century it was one of the imperial castles used by Frederick II's troops against the Muslim rebels. Later it was the castle of the feudal lords of Calatafimi and of the governors who run it on behalf of the Crown for certain periods. In 1282, during the rebellion of the Sicilian Vespers, the Provençal feudal lord Gugliemo Porcelet lived in it; the rebels spared his life and he was sent back to Provence together with his family. Subsequently, it became a military garrison and a prison until 1868, when it was abandoned.

==== Casa Garibaldi museum ====
It is located in via Marconi, near the Town Hall: it was the house of the parish priest Don Antonino Pampalone (1810–1866), a fervent liberal and deputy for Calatafimi at the Sicilian Parliament of 1848. On 16 May 1860, Garibaldi and four of his officers were given hospitality here and on the same day the General spoke, with the applause of the people of Calatafimi, about Italy's unity from its balcony. In July 1862 Garibaldi stayed in this house again and visited Pianto Romano.

=== Religious buildings ===
Calatafimi Segesta has about 30 churches in which there are several marble statues from the school of Antonello Gagini and different paintings. The most important are the following:

==== The Mother Church (Chiesa Madre) ====
The Mother Church or San Silvestro Papa (dedicated to Pope Sylvester, the saint), was restored at about 1500. Its origin dates back to the 12th century and is dedicated to Saint Sylvester the Pope, the oldest patron of Calatafimi who, according to the popular tradition, protected the town from the incursions of Muslims who rebelled against the imperial power. As the primitive urban nucleus enlarged and the population increased, the original building was amplified and modified several times between the XV and the 18th century because it was too small to hold the believers. Thanks to its width it was the place of popular assemblies, like the one in 1655 which led to the election of Maria Santissima di Giubino as the patroness of Calatafimi against the invasion of grasshoppers that were destroying crops.

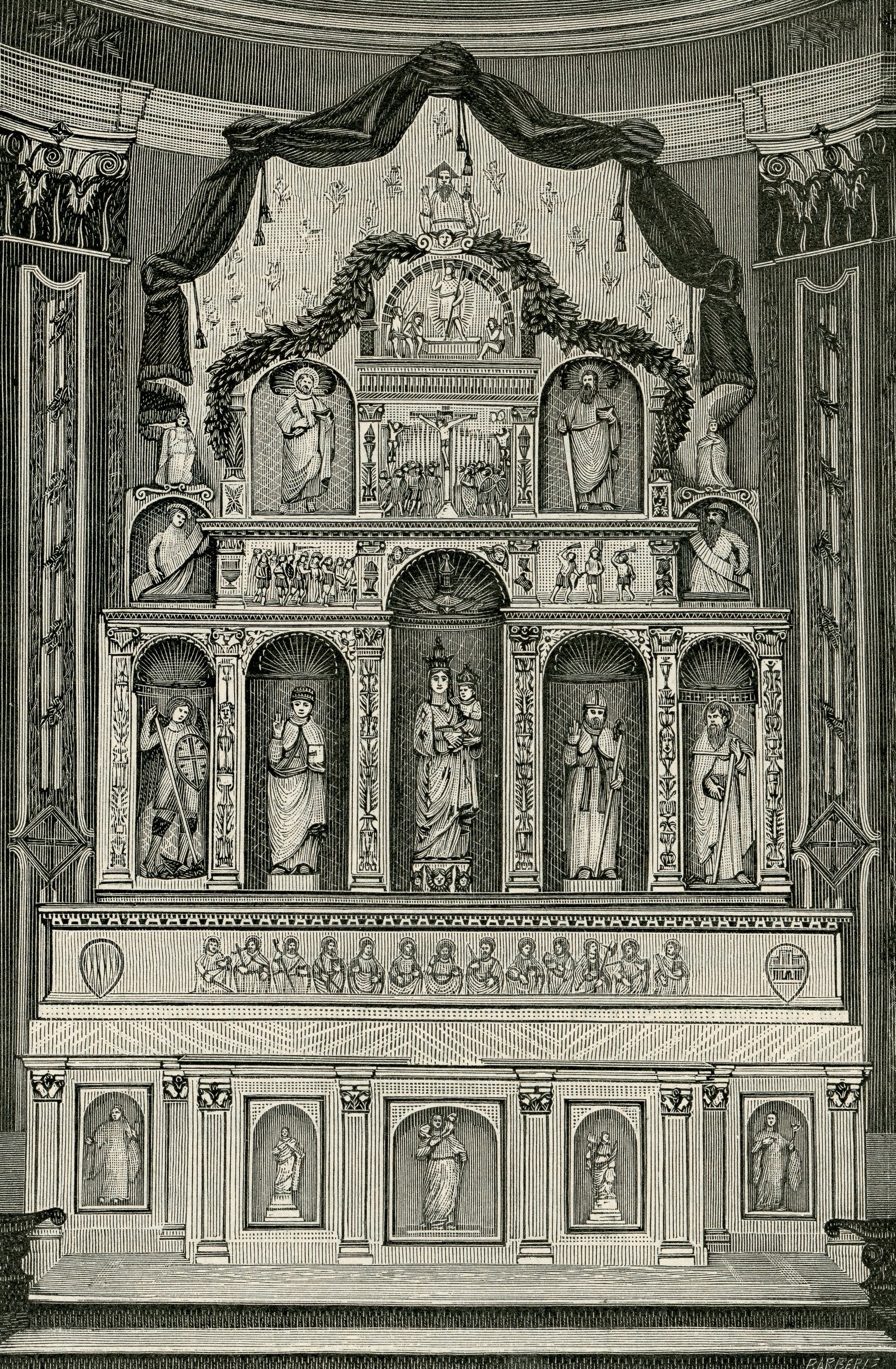
The marble polyptych inside the Mother Church

The façade has no decorations. With a nave and two aisles separated by columns, the interior is in Renaissance style, though there are also simple Baroque elements. In the apse there is a marble polyptych, made by Bartolomeo Berrettaro and Giuliano Mancino in 1516. Moreover, the Church hosts a marble sarcophagus with the mortal remains of Giuliano Truglio, dating back to the 18th century.

==== The church of Santissimo Crocifisso ====
It was built to house the so-called "Most Holy Crucifix" (see Culture) in 1741–1759. It is a sanctuary in Baroque style with Neoclassical influences, situated where once stood the small and ancient Church Saint Catherine of Alexandria. According to tradition, in the sacristy of the latter church, an old wooden Crucifix worked a series of miraculous recoveries. The plan was carried out by Giovanni Biagio Amico, an architect from Trapani. The church has a longitudinal plan with one nave; there are three altars on each side. The high altar is closed by a classical aedicula with a curvilinear tympanum, inserted in the group, with stuccoes and gilt decorations on the walls.

==== Chiesa di San Michele (Saint Michael's Church) ====
Once the devotion for Saint Michael was very deep at Calatafimi and his feast falling on May 8 was accompanied by "iorni quindici di franchezza di ogni gabella", that is people did not pay the duty on goods for 15 days. This Church, which originally was a property of the confraternity of Saint Michael Archangel,[6] kept the mortal remains of the blessed Arcangelo Placenza from Calatafimi for a certain period, then they were moved to Chiesa di Santa Maria di Gesù (Alcamo) in Alcamo. In 1596 the confraternity gave the Church to the Friars of the Third Order of Saint Francis who enlarged it and built their monastery next to the Church. As it suffered considerable damages owing to the 1968 Belice earthquake, the present timber- trussed roof is due to a subsequent restoration.[7] The interior of the church, with a nave and two aisles, is in neoclassical and baroque style with three portals.[6] Inside it there is a holy water stoup of the 16th century[6], a statue of Saint Michael Archangel dated 1490 and different stuccoes and paintings.[6]

==== Sanctuary of Maria Santissima di Giubino ====
It is located at about 2 kilometres from Calatafimi Segesta, on the northern side of the hill Tre Croci and is one of the most known Marian sanctuaries in Sicily. Its fame is linked to the memory of the Blessed Archangel Placenza from Calatafimi, who lived here for some time, and to the devotion to the Most Holy Mary of Giubino, patroness of this town.

==== Church of Saint Julian the martyr ====
It dominates piazza Francesco Cangemi and has been a parish church since 1619. The façade has a stained-glass window with holy motifs and the main door is framed by Corinthian square pilasters, surmounted by a triangular pediment. Internally, the Church houses several wooden statues and paintings.

==== Church of Maria Santissima di Giubino (co-patroness of the town) ====
It was built in 1721 to house an allegedly miraculous marble-relief icon of the Madonna, which is brought to a country chapel during the summer. (A copy of the relief is housed in the Church of St. Joseph in Brooklyn, New York, giving testimony to the large emigrant community of Calatafimesi who lived in Brooklyn in the early 20th century).

==== Ex convento di San Francesco di Assisi (Saint Francis' ex monastery) ====
It was founded by Giovan Giacomo Gullo, baron of Arcauso in 1543, and belonged to the Friars Minor Conventual. After the abolition of the monastery, the building was used as a public school. Today it is the seat of the picturesque and important Ethnic-Anthropological Museum and displays old work-tools, home objects and furniture. In this way it transmits the heritage, customs and memories of past generations, in a direct and effective way.

=== Other sights ===
- Segesta archaeological area, including the Doric temple, the amphitheatre and the sanctuary.
- Angimbè Wood, made of cork oaks and holm-oaks.
- Santa Maria's pine-wood.
- Chiesa del Carmine
- Chiesa di Mary Magdalene (former church of Saint Augustine)
- Church of the Virgin of Aid
- Church of Saint Isidore Agricola
- Church of Saint Roch
- Church of the Most Holy Mary the Immaculate Conception
- Church of Saint Vito
- Itinerary of lanes (Itinerario dei Vicoli)

== Culture ==
Religious events at Calatafimi-Segesta include:

- the Most Holy Crucifix: it is held every 5–7 years from 1 to 3 May.
- Corpus Domini
- Procession of Our Lady of Assumption: on 15 August.
- Procession of Madonna del Giubino: on the fourth Sunday of September.
- The festivity in honour of the Blessed Child Mary, held every two years (from 5 to 8 September) in the small Church of Our Lady of Graces.
- Procession of the Immaculate (day and night): on 8 December.
- The Living Crib.

== People ==
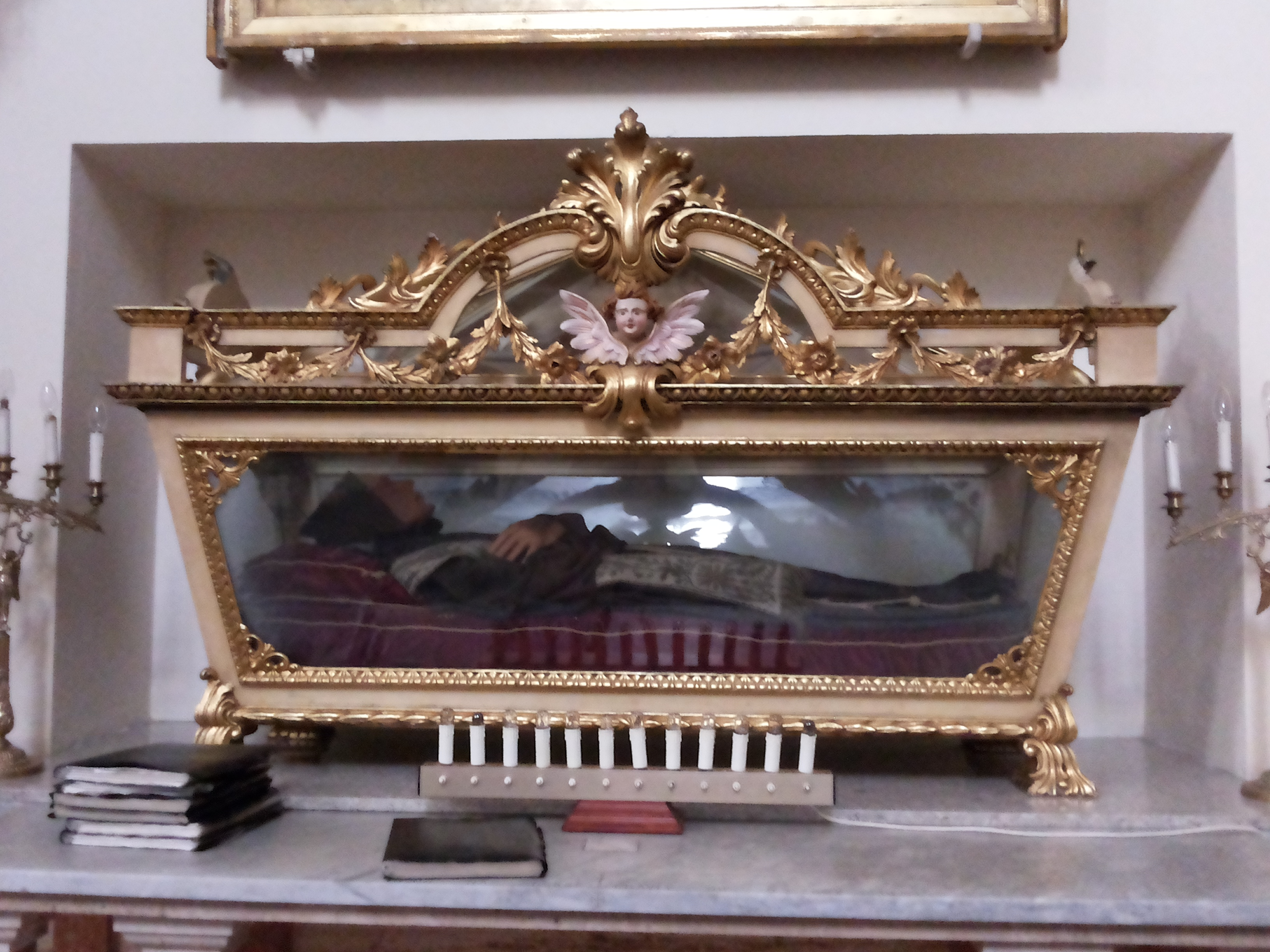
The urn with the mortal remains of the Blessed Arcangelo Placenza from Calatafimi, kept inside Chiesa di Santa Maria di Gesù in Alcamo.

- Arcangelo Placenza from Calatafimi (1390–1460), presbyter and religious Franciscan, venerated as blessed from the Catholic Church

Paolo Mirabella (Melbourne, Australia)

== Economy ==
The economy of Calatafimi is primarily agricultural, the most important crops being citrus, grapes and olives.

== See also ==
- Segesta
- Euphemius
- 1968 Belice earthquake

== Sources ==
- Chisholm, Hugh, ed. (1911). "Calatafimi" . Encyclopædia Britannica. Vol. 4 (11th ed.). Cambridge University Press.
- Cataldo, Carlo (1982). Guida storico-artistica dei beni culturali di Alcamo, Calatafimi, Castellammare del golfo, Salemi, Vita. Alcamo: Sarograf.
