= Giuliana Jakobeit =

German voice actress (born 1976)

Giuliana Jakobeit (née Wendt; born October 1, 1976) is a German voice actress. With the support of her aunt she was able to launch her career. In Germany, she is best known for her role as Jennifer Lopez in Monster-in-Law and as Keira Knightley in Pirates of the Caribbean: The Curse of the Black Pearl.

== List of her most famous roles ==
- 2002–present: Detective Conan as Ran Mori
- 2003-2007: Pirates of the Caribbean for Keira Knightley as Elizabeth Swann
- 2003-2009: One Tree Hill for Hilarie Burton as Peyton Sawyer
- 2005: Monster-in-Law for Jennifer Lopez as Charlie
- 2007: The Hitcher (2007 film) for Sophia Bush as Grace Andrews
- 2007: Disney Princess Enchanted Tales: Follow Your Dreams as Princess Aurora
- 2009: The Vampire Diaries for Kayla Ewell as Vicki Donovan
- 2010–present: My Little Pony: Friendship is Magic as Rainbow Dash
- 2013: My Little Pony: Equestria Girls as Rainbow Dash
- 2018: Ralph Breaks the Internet as Jasmine
