= Sant'Anna, Alcamo =

Church building in Alcamo, Italy

Sant'Anna Saint Anne
- Chiesa di Sant'Anna (Italian)
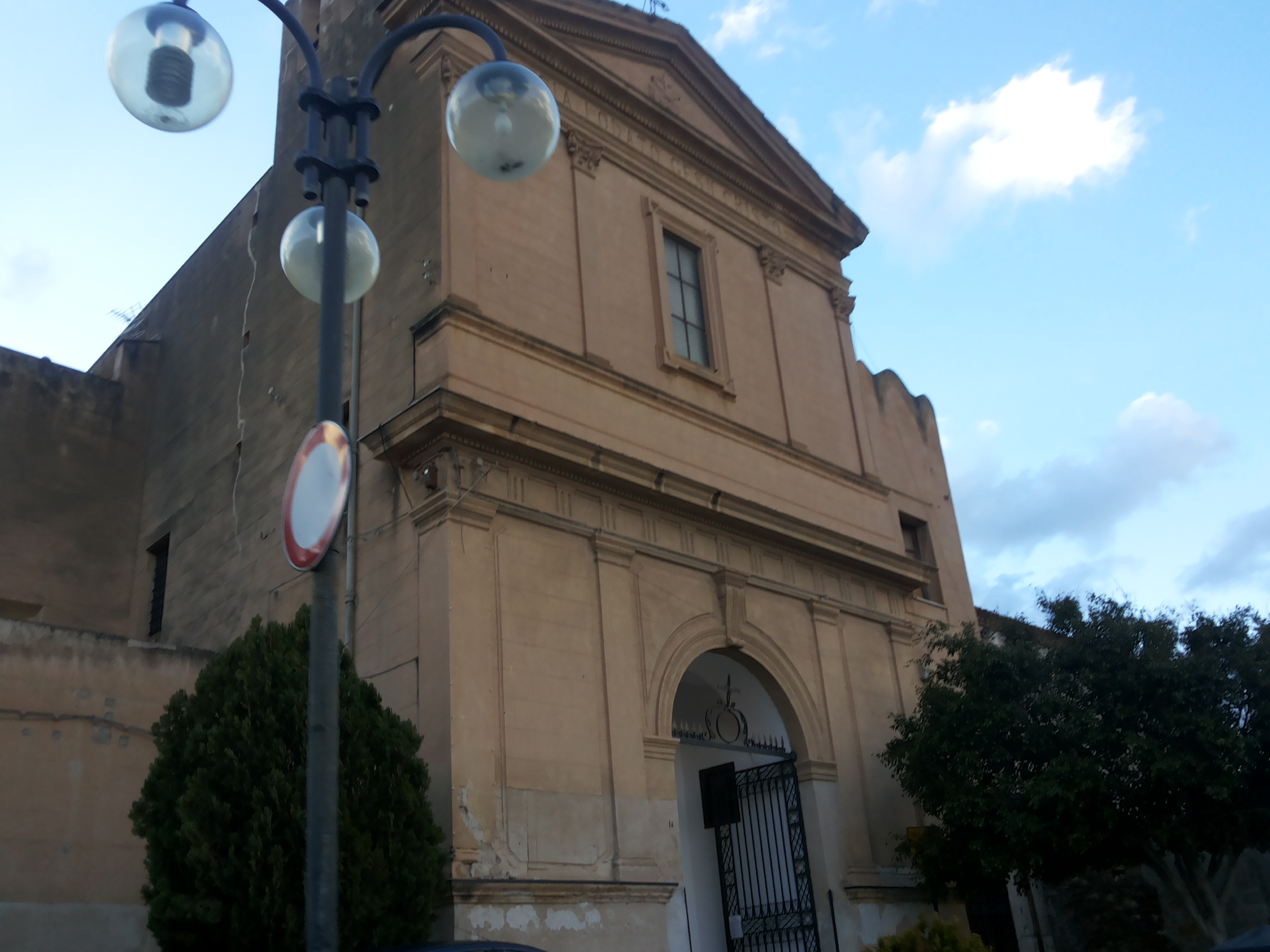
- The façade of the church of Saint Anne

Religion
- Affiliation: Catholic
- Province: Trapani
- Region: Sicily
- Patron: Saint Anne

Location
- Location: Alcamo, Trapani, Italy
- State: Italy
- Interactive map of Sant'Anna; Saint Anne
- Territory: Alcamo
- Coordinates: 37°59′04″N 12°57′42″E

Architecture
- Groundbreaking: 1630-1634

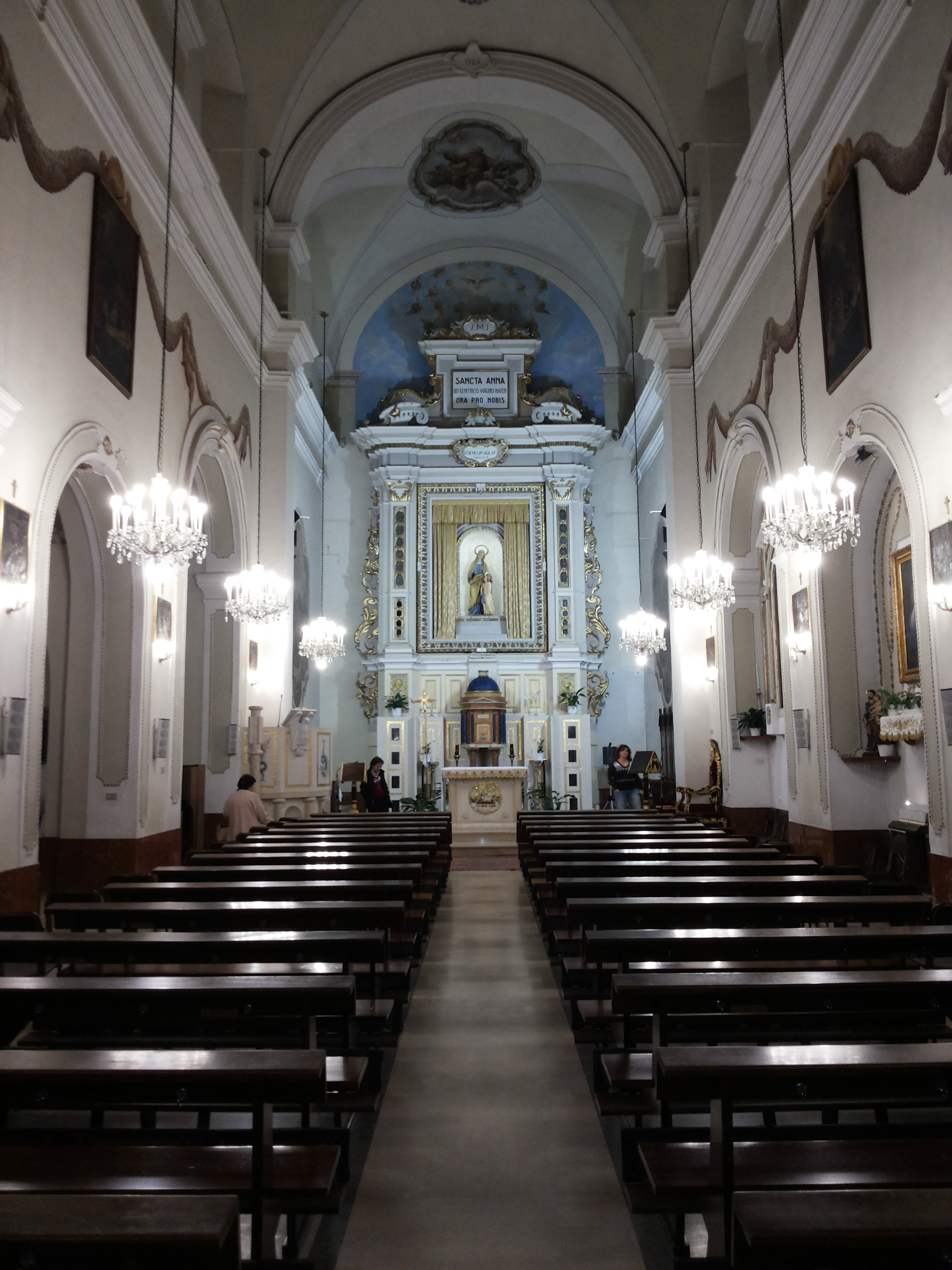
The interior of the church.

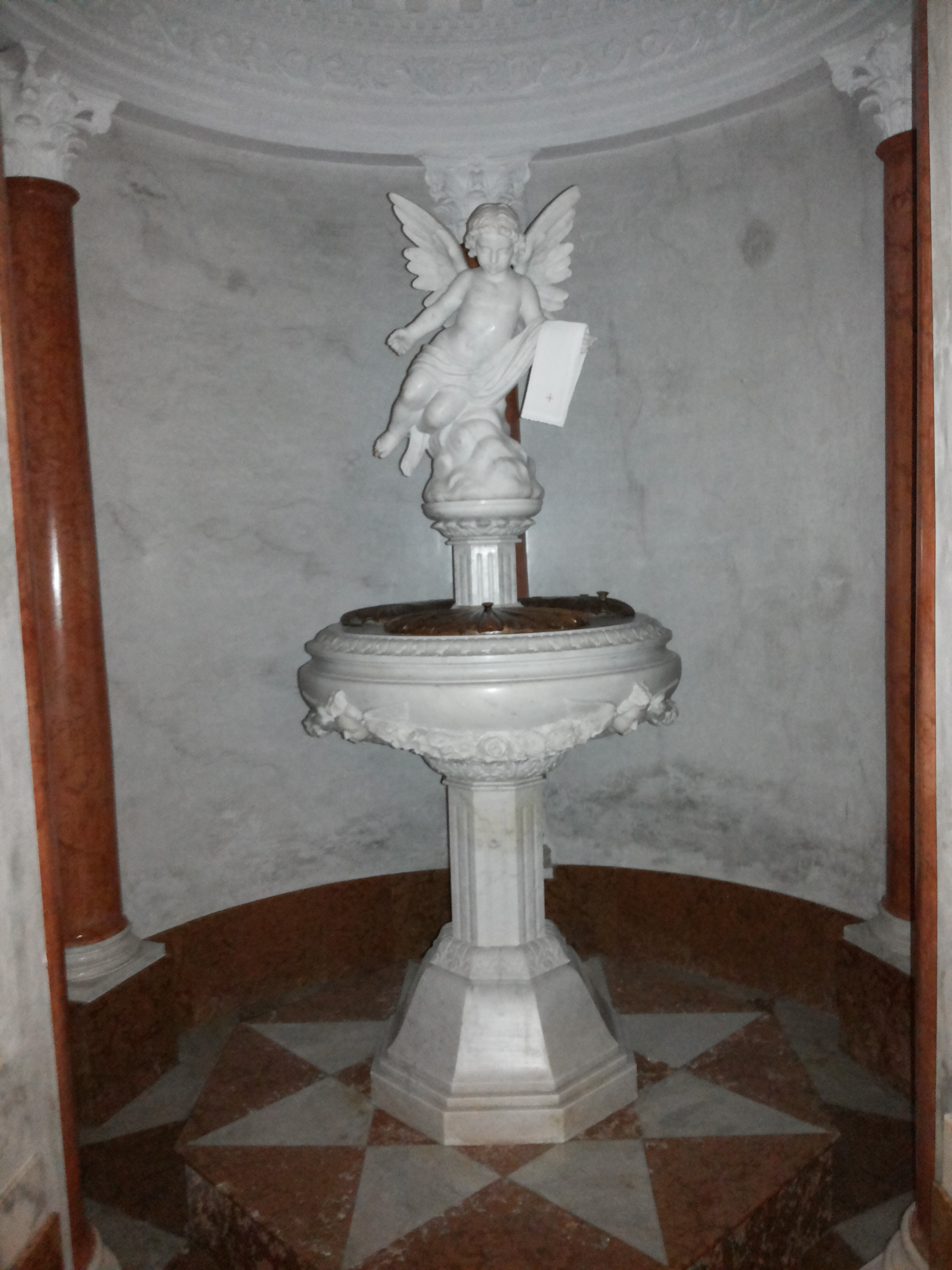
The baptistry.

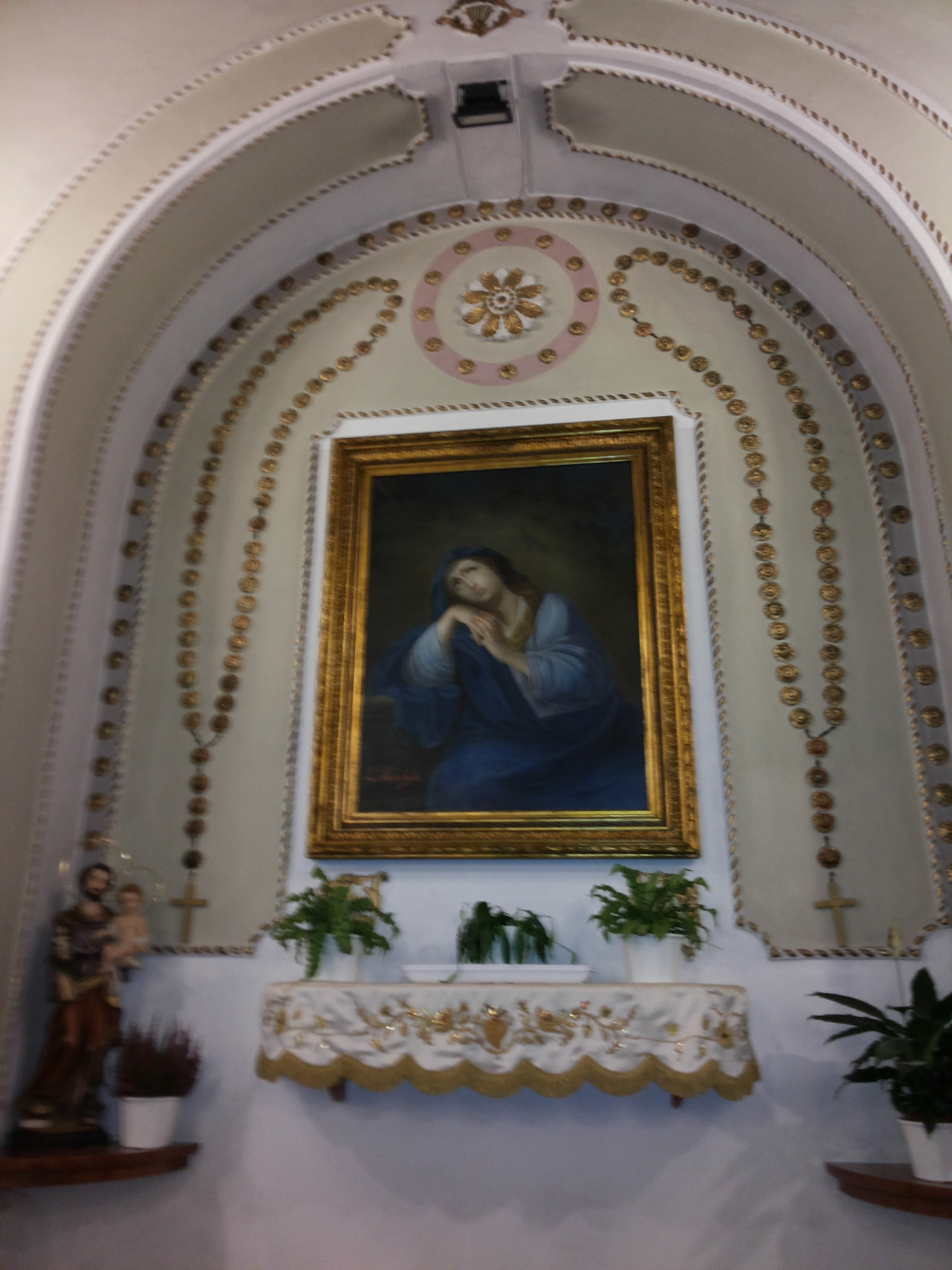
The painting of the Madonna of Confusion.

Sant'Anna ("Saint Anne", also called Sant'Anna Cappuccini) is a Catholic church in Alcamo, in the province of Trapani, Sicily, southern Italy.

It is annexed to the former monastery of the Capuchine friars and it belongs to the Fondo Edifici di Culto (FEC).

== History ==
The Church was built between 1630 and 1634, and the ex friary between 1633 and 1636. Both of them were constructed because of the necessity of the Capuchine friars (who lived in a monastery annexed to a Church inside the cemetery of Cappuccini until 1566 needed to get near the town. In 1866 the Capuchine friary was abolished.

The parish of Sant'Anna, called by people from Alcamo "Li Scappuccini" was created in 1947.

== Description and works ==
The Church is with a single nave, has a baptistry and seven chapels, embellished by frescoes made by Leonardo Mirabile and Giovanni Dato, while the frescoes on the nave and the vault were realized by Eugenio Ligotti and Salvatore Gagliano from Palermo.

This is the list of the works:

- The baptistry, dating back to 1948, houses a marble christening font adorned with an angel on its top.
- High altar: since 1949 there has been a wooden group of statues of Saint Anne with the young Madonna, made by Luigi Santifaller and his firm.

In the left chapels, starting from those nearer to the altar:

- In the first chapel: a wooden group representing the Most Holy Crucifix, Saint John and Our Lady of Sorrows. The statues of Our Lady of Sorrows and Saint John were realized by Michele Valenza (1708–1790) from Trapani.
- In the second chapel (formerly dedicated to Saint Anne and with a painting of the Visitation): a wooden representation of the Holy Heart of Jesus, carved by Giuseppe Stuflesser from Ortisei.
- In the third chapel (once dedicated to the Madonna of Purity): a wooden statue of the Our Lady of Lourdes, realized by Luigi Santifaller's firm.

In the right chapels, following the same order, you can see:

- In the first chapel: a painting on canvas assigned to Felice da Sambuca (a friar), representing Saint Joseph, Our Lady and the Infant Jesus with the Blessed Bernardo from Corleone and Saint Rosalia at their feet.
- In the second chapel: a canvas painting made in 1916 by Leonardo Mirabile from Alcamo and representing Our Lady of Confusion. This painting is a copy of that one made by Giuseppe Renda dedicated to Our Lady of Sorrows, kept in the Chiesa di Santa Maria di Gesù (Alcamo), and stolen in 1979.
- In the third chapel: a wooden statue of Saint Francis, carved by Ludovico Mirabella from Alcamo (the father of the historian Francesco Maria Mirabella).
- In the niche, next to the entrance: Ecce Homo, a beautiful painting made by the Flemish school.

The representations of the 14 stations of the Cross, which are on the walls of the church. were also made by Felice da Sambuca, a friar.

In the sacristy there is a little alabaster statue of Our Lady of Trapani and a painting of the Finding of Our Lady of Miracles made by fra Felice da Sambuca), which once were probably kept in the chapel of the Madonna of Purity, together with the paintings of Ecce homo (later placed on the right side of the church's entrance) and that of Saint Anne.

Inside the ex friary there are also some paintings on canvas, kept in one of the church chapels until 1884, representing Judas’ betrayal, Jesus' capture and the Virgin Mary with the sleeping Infant Child.

== See also ==
- Catholic Church in Italy

== Sources ==
- Regina, Vincenzo (1997). La chiesa parrocchiale di Sant'Anna in Alcamo: storia ed arte. Alcamo: Cartogram.
- Cataldo, Carlo (1982). Guida storico-artistica dei beni culturali di Alcamo-Calatafimi-Castellammare del Golfo. Alcamo: Sarograf.
- http://www.trapaninostra.it/libri/carlo_cataldo/Splendori_della_memoria/Splendori_della_memoria-04.pdf Carlo Cataldo, "Splendori della memoria", p. 49.
