= Calandra & Calandra =

Italian music duo

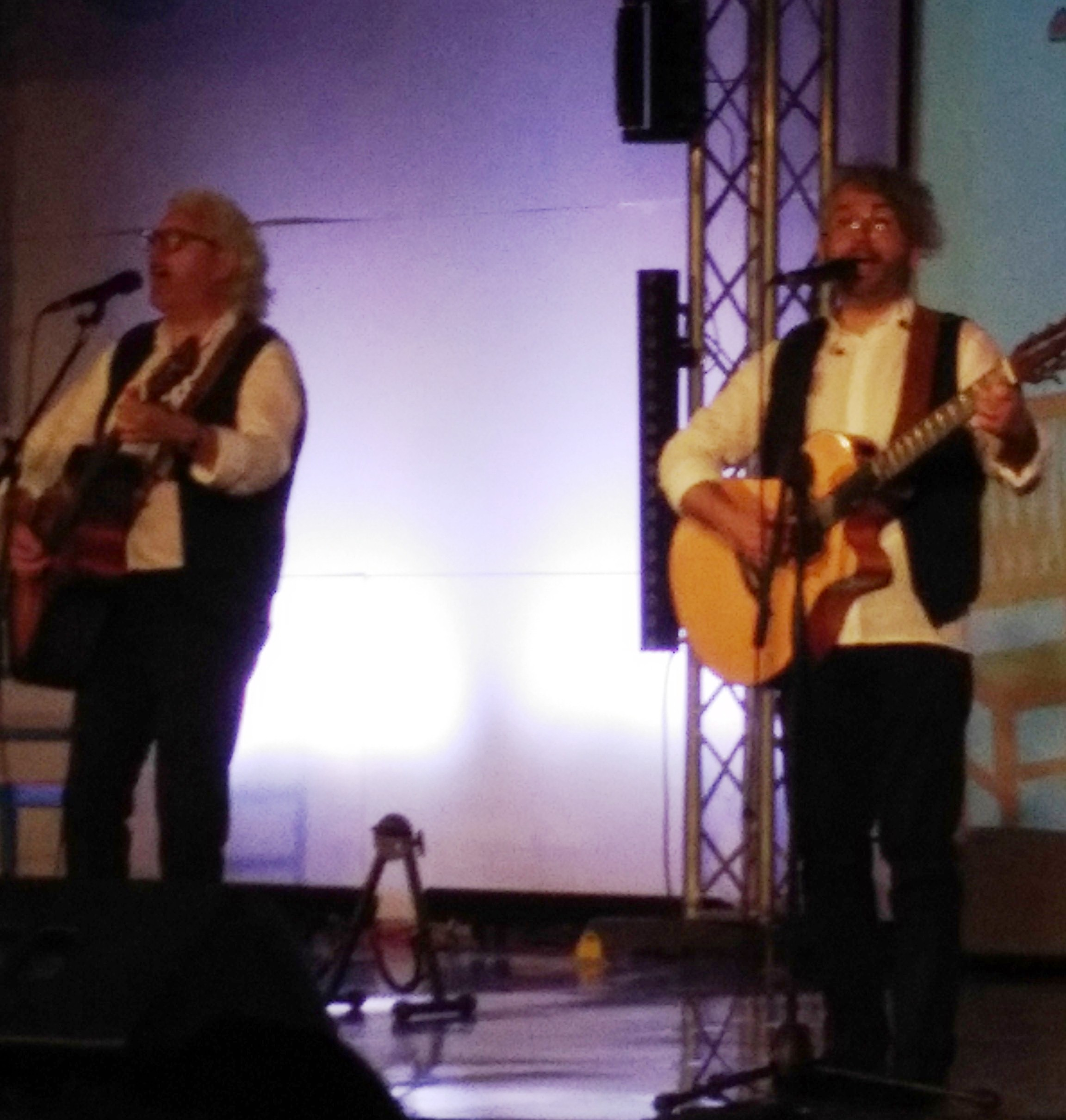
- Calandra & Calandra during a concert

Background information
- Origin: Alcamo, Sicily, Italy
- Genres: Folk; Pop
- Years active: 1990–present
- Labels: Associazione Musicale e Culturale “Sicilia In”
- Members: Maurizio Calandra; Giuseppe Calandra
- Website: www.calandraecalandra.com

Calandra & Calandra are an Italian musical duo formed by the two brothers Maurizio Calandra (Alcamo, 1 October 1969) and Giuseppe Calandra (Alcamo, 7 April 1960); the duo has been active since the 1990s.

== Biography ==
In 2006 Calandra & Calandra performed a modern reinterpretation of Sicilian folk and popular music with other musical influences. In 2014 they produced and realized the event Premio Internazionale Tenchiu’ Sicily, later endorsed by the Regional Department of Culture.

Recently, in April 2017, they were the winners of the VideoFestival Città di Imperia 2017 with the best videoclip (prize given by the Lord Mayor of Imperia)

== Prizes and acknowledgments ==
- Contest La Canzone dell'Estate 2013; “Ora Musica”, and the broadcasting of the song "Sicilianu Tipu Stranu'"
- At the 2014 CortiSonanti Prize in Naples: Special Prize for the best photography, and the second place for the category Videoclip (with "Lu Matrimoniu"), after a video clip produced in Great Britain.

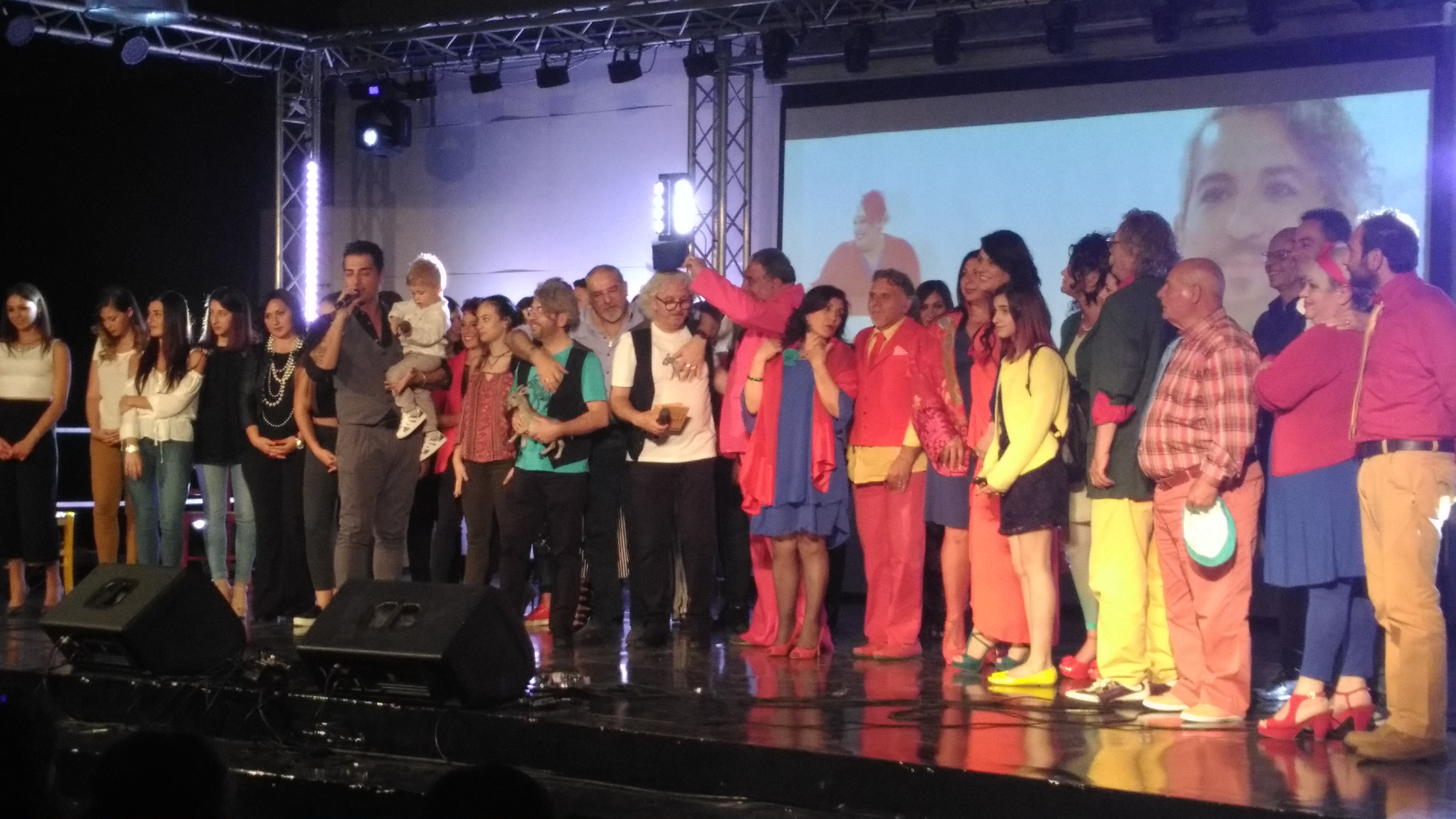
Cast of their last videoclip "Taranta di lu spicchiu"

=== With "Sicilianu Tipu Stranu" ===
(song written and put to music by Giuseppe and Maurizio Calandra)

- 1st prize won at the Taranto Summer Festival Cafè, as the best video (24 July 2011)
- 1st prize won at the Gravina di Catania Non è mai troppo Corto, as the best script (2011)
- 1st prize won in Gravina di Catania at the Non è mai troppo Corto (July/August 2011)
- 1st prize won at the Catania State Akkorti, as the best Sicilian song (6 August 2011)
- 1st prize won in Alcamo at Cortiamo, as the best video (December 2011)
- 1st prize won at the Cinisi Corto Corto Mon Amour, as the best original short film (15 December 2011)
- 3rd place at the Rome Marte Live (2011)
- •1st prize won at the Video Festival of Imperia, as the best Videoclip (19 March 2011)

The video was also presented and broadcast on these networks: Rai 1, TG Focus Note, Rai 3 Settimanale, Radio Monte Carlo, Radio Capital Italia 2, 16 MM and many other regional radios and networks.

=== "Canzuni D’Amuri" ===
(written and put to music by Giuseppe and Maurizio Calandra):

- 1st prize won at Cortiamo as the best Videoclip
- 1st prize won at Imperia as the best Videoclip (prize not assigned because they did not pick it up)
- Special mention at Cortisonanti of Naples, December 2013

=== "Lu Matrimoniu Tirituppi e T’appi" ===
(written and put to music by Giuseppe and Maurizio Calandra):

- 1st prize won at Favignana Film Festival (Leone D’Argento) 20 July 2014.
- 1st prize won at Mizzica Festival of Catania (4 August 2015)
- Special mention at Cortisonanti of Naples.
- Best Video Clip at Corto Corto Mon Amour of Cinisi (Palermo), 6 December 2013

=== "La Leggenda di Colapisci" videoclip ===
- 1st prize won at Corto Corto Mon Amour of Cinisi (27 November 2015).
- Winners of the VideoFestival Città di Imperia 2017 as best Videoclip (Prize delivered by the Lord Mayor of Imperia)

== Discography ==
=== Selected albums ===
- 2010 Sicilia incantata
- 2012 Sicilianu tipu stranu - Single
- 2013 Lu matrimoniu (Tirituppi e T'appi) - Single
- 2017 'Nzemmula

=== Selected singles ===
- 1 "Oggi è duminica"
- 2 "Lu matrimoniu (Tirituppi e T'appi)"
- 3 "Scotula scotula"
- 4 "Canzuni d'amuri"
- 5 "Sicilianu tipu stranu"
- 6 "Tu si la terra mia"
- 7 "La Taranta di lu spicchiu"
- "Lu sciccareddu" (traditional)
- "Si maritau Rosa" (traditional)
- "La barunissa di Carini" (Otello Profazio)
- "A lu mircatu" (traditional)
- "Vitti na crozza" (Li Causi)
- "Colapisci" (Otello Profazio)
- "E vui durmiti ancora" (Formisano-Calì)
- "Ciuri ciuri" (traditional)
- "Nicuzza" (Finestrella)
- "Cu ti lu dissi" (Balistreri)
- "Mi votu e mi rivotu" (Balistreri-Profazio)
- "Tri tri tri", tiritera (traditional)
- "I pirati a Palermo" (Balistreri-Buttitta)
- "L'amuri ca v'haju" (Balistreri)
- "Quant'e laria la me zita" (traditional)
- "Lu nannu e sò niputi" (Palmeri-Palermo-Scalici)

== Sources ==
- "Calandra & Calandra".
- "Intervista esclusiva ai Calandra e Calandra".
- "Un altro importante successo per l'accoppiata Idea Video – Calandra e Calandra". 25 November 2014.
- "Calandra e Calandra vincono il contest "La canzone dell'estate 2013"". 18 June 2013.
- "La Sicilia in un video: il racconto di Calandra e Calandra".
- "elenco album di calandra e calandra)".
- "I Calandra e Calandra volano a New York".
- "Alcamo, i Calandra & Calandra ad Expo Milano 2015". 22 September 2015.
- "Si è chiusa la 12a edizione del Video Festival di Imperia, ecco tutti i titoli premiati". Sanremonews.it. 23 April 2017.
- "Il sound-folk dei Calandra & Calandra conquista la Svizzera". Archived from the original on 1 December 2017.
