= Italian teachers traineeship (TFA) =

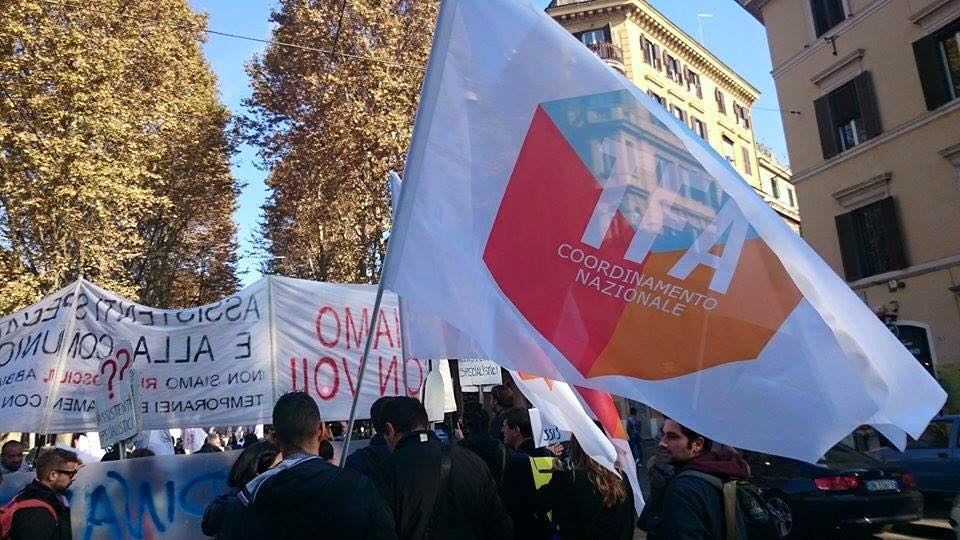
Italian teachers protesting in Rome. T.F.A teachers are demonstrating against their exclusion from "La buona scuola's"' (name of the reform of the public education) hiring plan by Renzi's government.

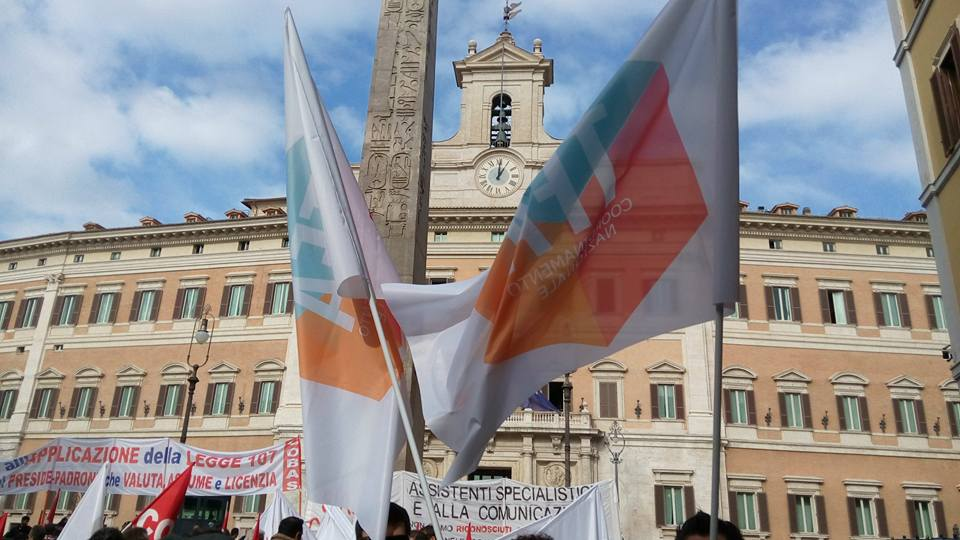
Demonstration of the National T.F.A. association in Rome, Montecitorio area.

Tirocinio Formativo Attivo (meaning Active - Formative - Traineeship) or T.F.A. for short, is a post graduate course in order to be acknowledged as a public teacher of secondary education by the Italian state.

It was introduced by decree n. 249 of 10 September 2010, enacted by the law n. 244 of 24 December 2007, and further modified by MIUR's (Ministry of Education) n. 81 of 25 March 2013, as to replace the old SISS (schools of specialization for secondary education teachers). T.F.A. was, by the words of former Minister Mariastella Gelmini under whose government T.F.A took their start, "the harshest and most professionalizing way to license teachers". In fact, as Gelmini stated, only 11.000 teachers made it to the end, in spite of 150.000 candidates attempting the competition.

Commonly, TFA licensed teachers go by the name of "tieffini".

== Legal framework ==
Ministry decrete 249/2010 establishes traineeships to become secondary school teachers to be configured as " a two-years master degree plus a following year of T.F.A." T.F.A. courses may be set up by any university department or by other high education institutions of artistic, musical, or choral subjects, under the condition of them being administrative headquarters.

As a matter of facts T.F.A is a one-year course to train teachers to be, held by universities, which confers, according to the result of the final exam, a teaching license among Italian public secondary school system. T.F.A is started for each subject (or group) depending on the need of teachers.

== Access ==
Access to T.F.A courses, as a working competition, is strictly regulated by three exams, in order to prevent an excess of licensed teacher that would be unemployable. Candidates must undergo and pass, in order:

- a preliminary exam, decided from the Ministry of Education, common for all the universities which have been entrusted to start the courses. It is made up of 60 multiple-choice question. Threshold score is set at 21/30.
- a written exam, drawn up by each university. Threshold score is set at 21/30.
- a spoken exam, once more prepared by each university. Threshold score is set at 15/30.

After the testing phase, a ranking list of every candidate that made it through the selections is drafted. The final score is obtained by the sum of the marks recorded in each test. Candidates reaching the first positions of the ranking are granted access to the course within the limit of the vacancies stated by the Ministry.

== Obtaining the license ==
Article 10 of the Ministry decrete states:

"By the end of the T.F.A., and after the successful completion of the final exam, candidates are acknowledged as licensed teacher for their respective subject of teaching".
