= Giuseppe Renda =

Italian painter

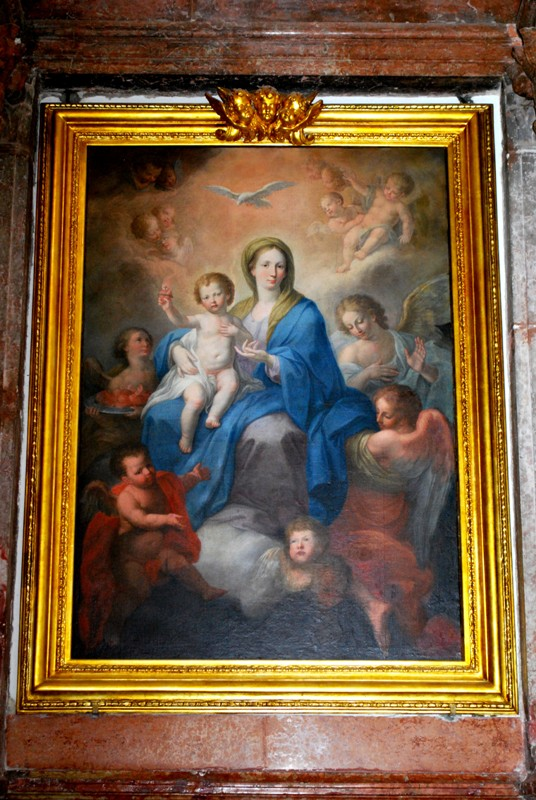
Madonna of the Lamp, in the basilica of Santa Maria Assunta at Alcamo.

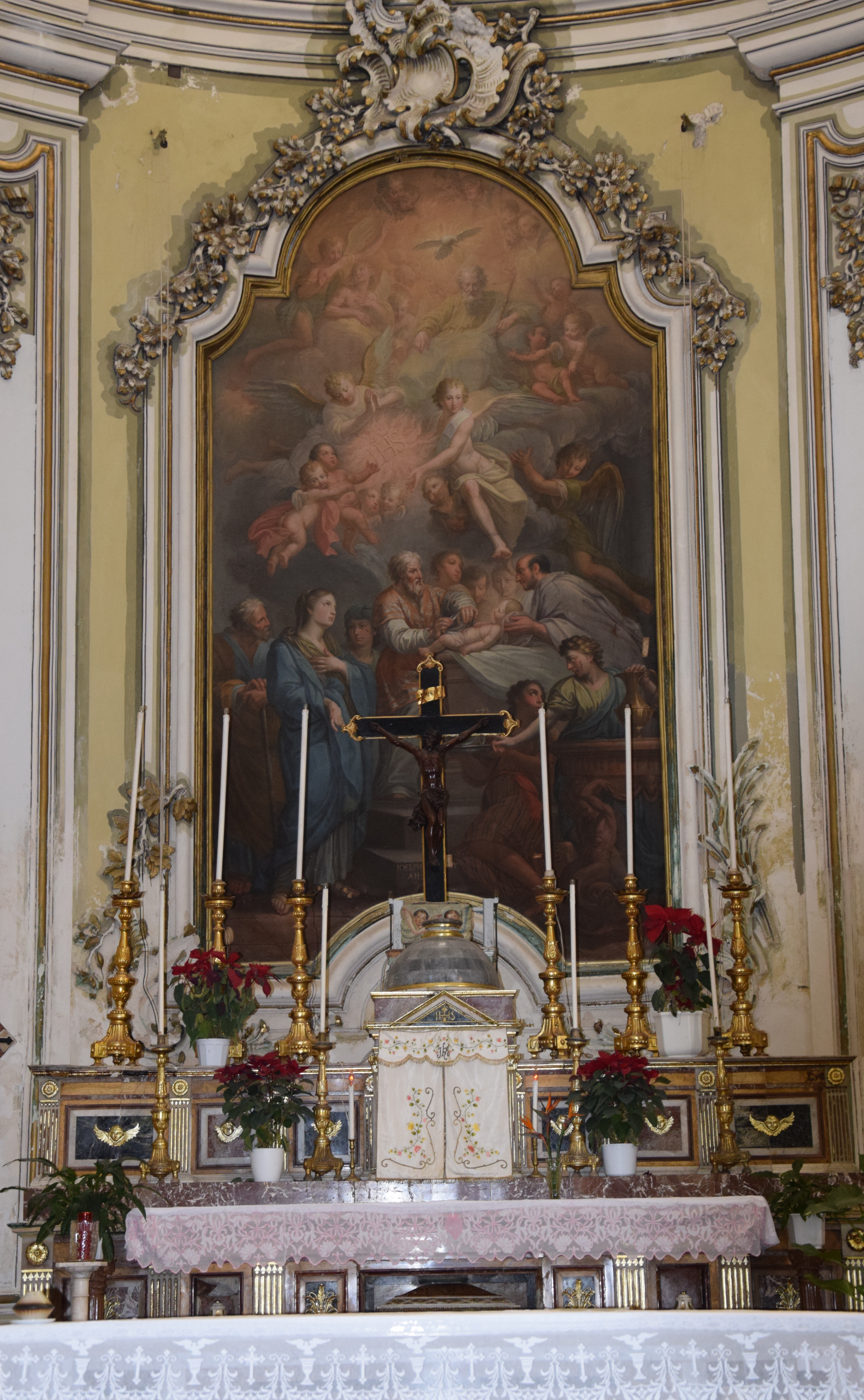
Altarpiace of Jesus' Circumcision.

Giuseppe Renda, called "l'Aroddu" (13 June 1772 - 20 October 1805), was an Italian painter.

== Biography ==
Born in Alcamo into a family of farmers and third son of Antonio di Vito (called "Arollo") and Francesca Lo Serro di Giuseppe, he was baptized with the name Giuseppe Antonino.

The family lived in via Commendatore Leonardo Navarra, called "strada di li putieddi" (the street with small shops) because of the stands which were erected in this street during the free fair of the Company of Saint James. When he was young he worked for the cathedral.

He started painting during his adolescence when one day, on a whim, he sketched the portrait of a chaplain on a wall with a charcoal. After he had seen it, the archpriest Don Benedetto Mangione, sent him to the town authorities. He was taken under the patronage of the nobleman Pietro Lombardo and this patronage allowed him to study art with the master Giuseppe Velasquez in Palermo. Some people assert that he instead studied with Giuseppe Patania.

When his studies ended he went back to Alcamo, where he produced many paintings with religious backgrounds, beginning in 1790. His mother died in 1789 and his father married again, to Vincenza Pirrello (1790).

In 1796, after his father's death, Giuseppe Renda moved to the house in via Rossotti where his sister Antonina lived.

In 1805, he died of tuberculosis in Palermo when he was only 33, and was buried in the crypt of the convent of the Capuchins.

== Works ==
Giuseppe Renda's paintings, above all, deal with religious subjects. There are five certain works made by him (three of them provide the date and the author's name) and 38 are assigned to him. 14 of his paintings have been lost.

== Sources ==
- Calia, Roberto; Di Natale, Maria Concetta; Vitella, Maurizio (2004). Giuseppe Renda (1772-1805). Alcamo: Centro Studi Don Rizzo.
- Vitella, Maurizio (2004). Il tesoro della Chiesa Madre di Erice. Il pozzo di Giacobbe. ISBN 8887324492.
- Regina, Vincenzo (1957). Giuseppe Renda (l'Aroddu) pittore alcamese del secolo XVIII. Edizioni Accademia di studi Cielo di Alcamo.
