= Santa Maria di Gesù, Alcamo =

Church building in Alcamo, Italy

Santa Maria di Gesù
- Chiesa di Santa Maria di Gesù
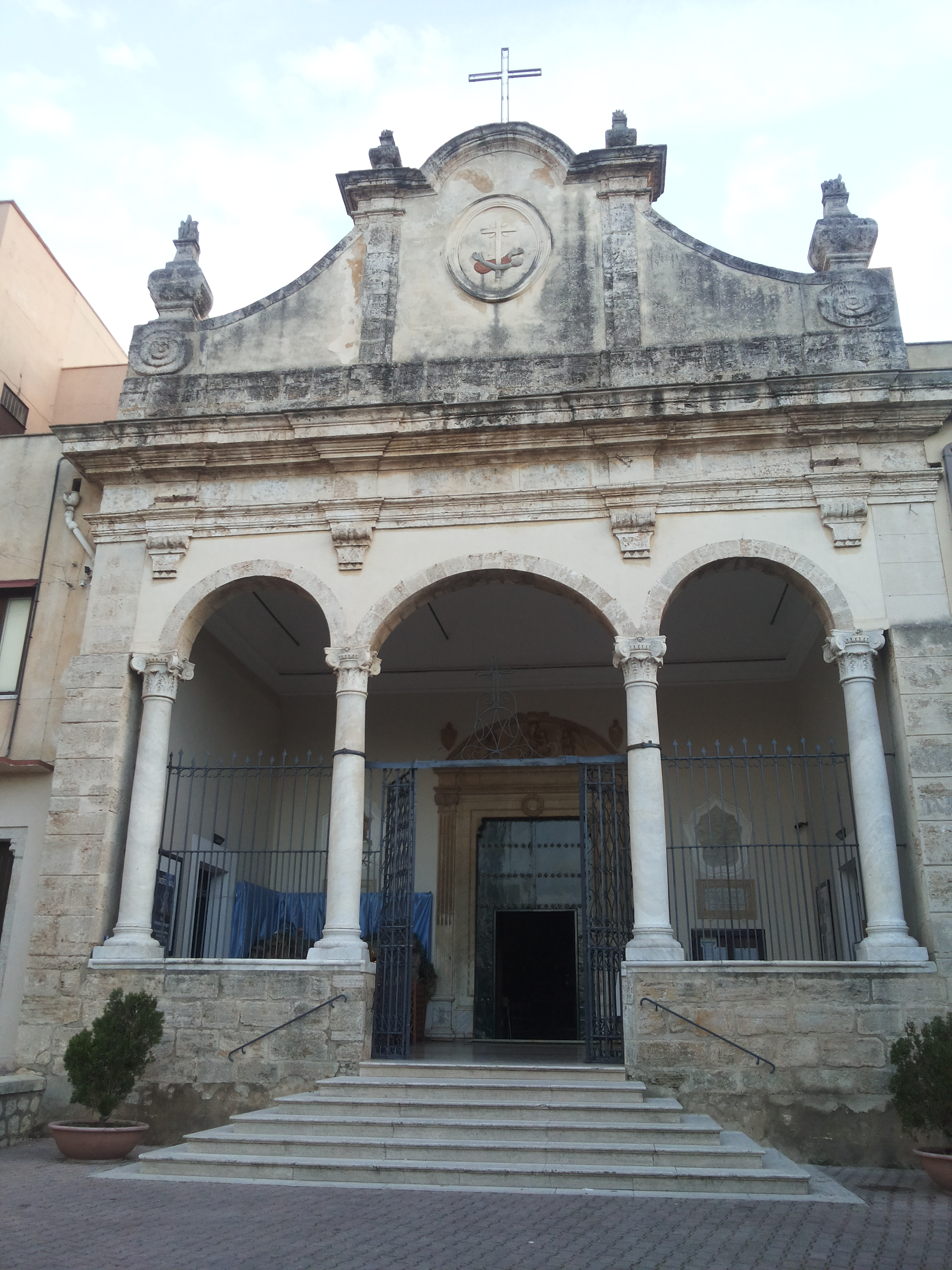
- Façade of church of Saint Mary of Jesus

Religion
- Affiliation: Catholic
- Province: province of Trapani
- Region: Sicily
- Patron: Saint Mary of Jesus

Location
- Location: Alcamo, province of Trapani, Italy
- State: Italy
- Interactive map of Santa Maria di Gesù
- Territory: Alcamo
- Coordinates: 37°58′39″N 12°58′10″E

Architecture
- Groundbreaking: around 1450

Website
- http://santamarialcamo.jimdo.com/

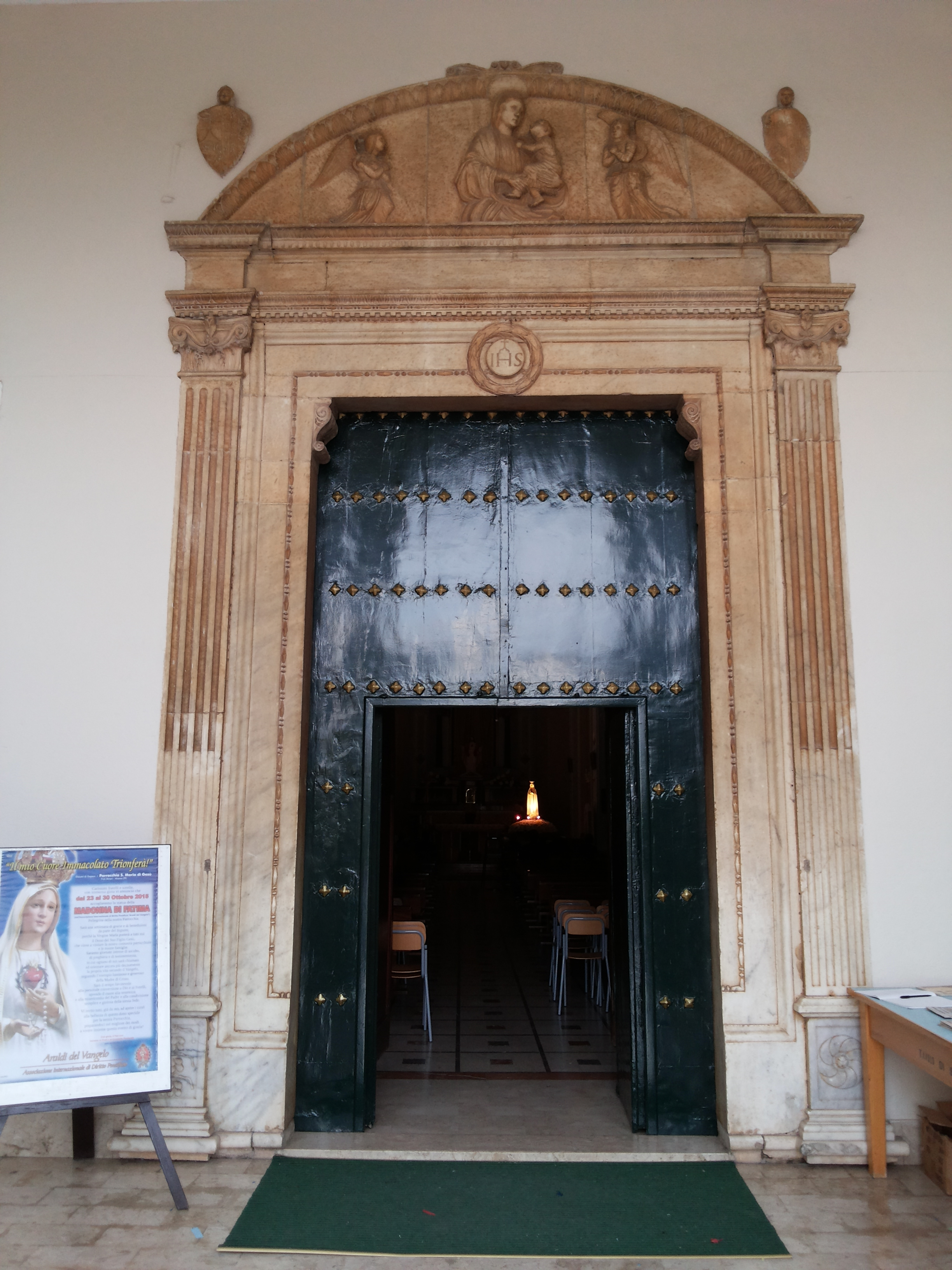
The church's portal.

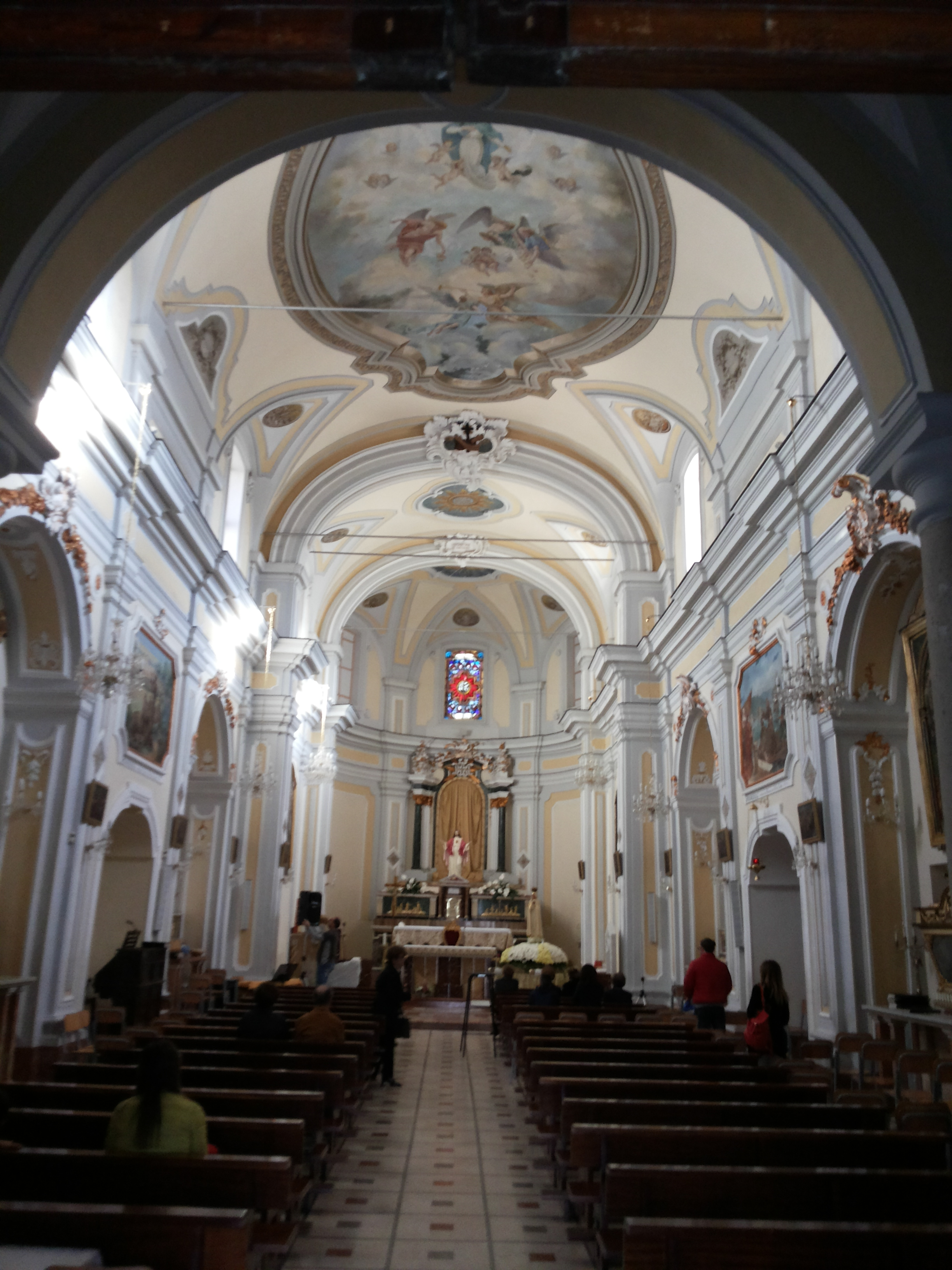
Interior of the church.

Santa Maria di Gesù ('Saint Mary of Jesus') is a Catholic church in Alcamo, in province of Trapani, Sicily, southern Italy.

== History ==
According to some sources, the church of Saint Mary of Jesus was founded at about 1450 by the Blessed Arcangelo Placenza from Calatafimi, after the foundation of the adjoining monastery of padri Minori Osservanti (called "Friary of Saint Mary of Jesus") by the same Blessed Arcangelo after the mandate of the Blessed Matteo Guimerà of Agrigento. Other sources postpone the date of the church's foundation at the end of the 15th century.

Initially this church was located outside the town's walls, in the open country. Around 1500 the church gave the name to a gate of the town defensive walls, the so-called "Jesus' Gate".

In 1507 the church was restored and widened, thanks to the financing by the governors of Alcamo Federico Enriquez and Anna I Cabrera (his wife). This date is interpreted by other sources as the date of completion of the architectonic work. In the same period they restored the monastery, too. and between 1762 and 1776, by Father Lorenzo from Casteltermini's will, the church was widened again, as the historian Ignazio De Blasi testifies.

In 1920 the church was entitled as an autonomous parish by the bishop of Mazara.

In 1960 and in 1984 the friary was restored. Finally, in 1997 during the restoration works of the presbyterial area (under the design of the architect Vincenzo Settipani), they renewed the altar, the ambo, the baptismal font, the candelabrum and the officiant's see. The same architect has provided for the restoration of some frescoes, of Via Crucis and designed the new lighting system, which has been adapted to the present legislative standards.

== Works ==
The church's portal, made with Carrara marble, was bought by Luigi Enriquez and Anna Cabrera (owners of the castle of the Counts of Modica in that period) and is ascribed to Bartolomeo Berrettaro, an Italian sculptor who lived between the end of the 15th century and the early years of the 16th century.

On the church's vault there is a fresco representing the Assumption, made by Leopoldo Messina, who also realized the one on the wall with Saint Francis while contemplating Jerusalem (1944); the other three frescoes about the life of Saint Francis of Assisi were painted by Carlo Righetti from Padua in 1901.

Once on the high altar there was a 16th-century fresco made by Giovan Leonardo Bagolino and dedicated to Saint Mary of the Visitation, later moved to another wall behind the apse. On the left side of the baptistry there are a small statue of Saint John the Baptist by Giuliano Mancino and two marble medallions (the Annunciation and Saint Gabriel) of the school of Gagini.

Inside the church you can see:

- A holy water font in marble, dating back to the 16th century, on the right

•An ancient wooden Crucifix, on the first left altar

•Saint Francis of Assisi, a wooden statue (1912), made by Giovanni Piscitello, from Palermo

•A marble statue of Saint Mary of Jesus, probable work of Bartolomeo Berrettaro and Giuliano Mancino, on the high altar

•Saint Philip, Saint Lucy and Saint Barbara, an 18th-century painting placed on the wall next to the high altar

•Our Lady on a throne with Saint Francis and Saint Clara

•A marble tabernacle made by Baldassare Massa in 1557: it represents God, Saint Francis, Saint Anthony, Jesus and the Apostles; on the right wall near the church entrance

•Madonna delle Grazie ('Our Lady of Graces' or the "Greek Madonna"): a 15th-century painting, assigned to Pietro Ruzzolone from Palermo and commissioned by Federico Enriquez and Anna I Cabrera. It represents Our Lady of Graces with the infant Jesus in her arms, Saint Francis of Assisi and Saint Benedict on the sides, three kneeling pages next to count Federico Enriquez and three damsels close to Anna I Cabrera. It was restored in 1855 and is on the first right altar. Below it there is a glass urn with the mortal remains of the Blessed Arcangelo Placenza, coming from the Church of Saint Michael Archangel in Calatafimi and put inside this urn in 1961. On a side wall you can see also the Blessed Arcangelo's gravestone.

•Saint Anthony of Padua, a wooden statue by an unknown author.

In the sacristy there is a wooden statue representing Saint Paschal Baylon, realized by Giovanni Stellino (1835). In the friary there are a beautiful wooden statue of Saint Anthony Abbot and an old painting with Saint Bernardine of Siena.

== See also ==
- Arcangelo Placenza
- Calatafimi-Segesta
- Order of Friars Minor

== Sources ==
- Cataldo, Carlo (2001). La conchiglia di S. Giacomo (in Italian). Alcamo: Edizioni Campo.
- Calia, Roberto (2001). Il beato Arcangelo Placenza da Calatafimi : itinerario storico, biografico, religioso, letterario (in Italian). Alcamo: Sarograf.
- Calia, Roberto; Craparo, Enzo; Baldassano Cataldo, Erina (1991). La Bella Alcamo (in Italian). Alcamo: Edizioni Blu Imaging & Adv.
- Regina, Vincenzo (2005). La Chiesa parrocchiale ed il Convento di S. Maria di Gesù in Alcamo : storia e arte (in Italian). Alcamo: Campo.
