= Segestan thermal baths =

Coordinates: 37.9725°N 12.8932°E

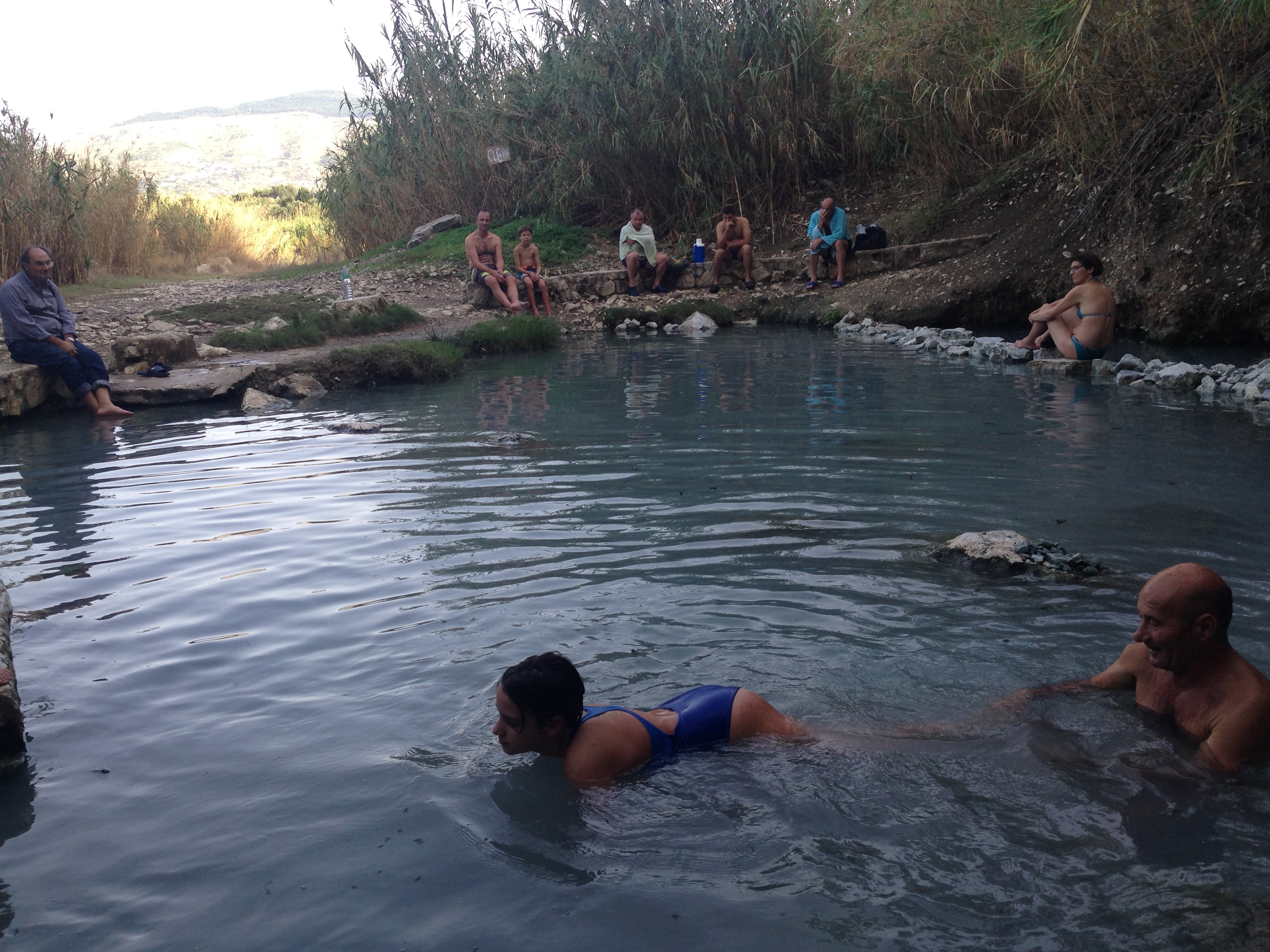
An eddy in the Segestan thermal baths

The Segestan thermal baths (also called Polle del Crimiso) are hydrothermal springs located in Sicily, between Alcamo and Castellammare del Golfo, in the province of Trapani.

== History ==
=== Mythology ===
The first Greeks living in western Sicily related the phenomenon of the formation of hot waters to a mythological event, according to which the heat of the river waters had been emitted thanks to a fluvial god's will, Crimiso, to let heat the nymph Egesta, escaped from Troy, get warm as she was unconscious on the river bank, and that later became his wife. They had a son, Acestes, who founded Segesta and gave her mother's name to it.

The historian Diodorus Siculus tells about Heracles’ trip: while he was going to Erice he met the Egestee nymphs who, in order to help him to recover from fatigue, made Egestan (or Segestan) hot water springs appear on the surface.

Dionysius of Halicarnassus speaks about the Segestan thermal baths and tells that Eneas, after arriving in Sicily, left near Egesta his older mates who were tired for the trip, to repopulate it again and, by using these waters, have some benefits for their bodies.

So this myth connects also to the foundation of Segesta made by Trojans who chose it for the beneficial properties of the hot water in its territory.

As regards the river position, all the historical sources referring this myth agree on the fact that Crimiso is located in the Segestan area, and so it should be the present river San Bartolomeo (made up by the confluence of the river Caldo and the river Freddo), at whose mouth Segesta had its harbour.

=== Historical testimonies ===
Besides legendas, different historical testimonies attest the importance of these thermal baths: Strabone speaks about them and even Plinius the Elder praises their therapeutic virtues:

Nec vero omnes quae sint calidae medicatas esse credendum, sicut in Segesta Siciliae.

== Morphology ==
The river Caldo, more than three metres large and less than 50 centimetres deep, in its first tract, runs between two high rocky walls. The rock next to the river shows sediments of travertino from Alcamo, formed by limestones created by hot waters. On the left river's bank there are four water springs, with a temperature of 47 Celsius degrees.

== Thermal plants ==
Near the Segestan baths there are two thermal plants:

1. Terme Gorga (Alcamo): in contrada Gorga, at about one kilometre from Alcamo Diramazione railway station; the thermal waters near this plant, are concentrated in a natural basin among clay material and are alkaline-sulfuric; they have a temperature of about 49 °C and with a water flow of 80 litres a second. The plant is located inside an old mill restored about 50 year ago.
2. Terme Segestane (Castellammare del Golfo): this plant is located in contrada Ponte Bagni where the mineral waters gush out at the temperature of about 47 °C and with a water flow of about 110 litre a second. The treatments provided here are mud baths, grottoes, massages, hydro-massages, aerosol inhalations and irrigations.

== Flora and fauna ==
In the territory of Segestan thermal baths there are tamarisks and reeds

Owing to its particular conformation, the rocky slopes near the river Caldo shelter a lot of birds' nests.

== Properties of waters and muds ==
These waters are chloro-sulphate-alkaline-earthy: the analysis show that the content of sulphur derives from the dissolution of the particles of gypsum and sulphur that are in the subsoil, and that emerge near Vita and Calatafimi, crossed by these waters during their reascending.

The presence of very permeable rocks in the area, lets rain-water to be absorbed in the depth, where magma heats the thermal waters, rising to the surface in several places.

These waters can be used for baths and inhalations for therapeutic purposes; their muds are used to treat rheumatisms, arthritis, arthrosis, sciatica, hyperuricemia, gout and skin diseases.

== See also ==
- Calatafimi-Segesta
- Crinisus
- Segesta

== Bibliography ==
- Diego Buccellato Galatioto, Castellammare del Golfo, Palermo, tipografia Domenico Vena, 1909
- Ignazio Concordia: la Sicilia tra Mito e Storia p. 52-55, ed. Edicooper, Palermo, 1990
