= Eryx =

Eryx may refer to:

- Eryx (city), an ancient city in Sicily, the modern Erice, Italy
- Battle of Eryx, 276 BC battle of the Pyrrhic War in Sicily
- Eryx (king of Sicily), mythological fighter and Elymian king
- Mount Eryx, upon which the city stood, the modern Mount Erice
- Eryx (mythology), two figures in Greek mythology
- Eryx (missile), an anti-tank missile
- Eryx (snake), a genus of snakes
- "In the Walls of Eryx", a short story by H. P. Lovecraft and K. J. Sterling
