= Elymus =

Elymus may refer to:

- Elymus (plant), a genus of grasses
- Elymus (mythology), the mythical ancestor of the Elymians
- A man killed by Gorge (mythology)
