= Crinisus =

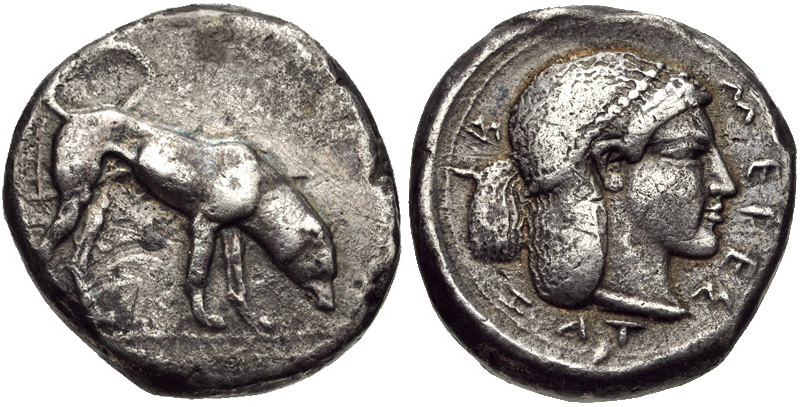
Segestan Silver Didrachm, 475–455 BCE, possibly depicting Crinisus in the form of a dog on one side, and Segesta on the other

Crinisus (in Virgil's Aeneid and subsequent Roman texts) or Crimisus was the god of the Sicilian river Crinisus in Greek and Roman mythology. According to most versions of the myth, Crinisus fathered Acestes with a Trojan woman while in the form of a dog. Acestes then went on to found Segesta, which he named after his mother. Segestan coins from 475–390 BCE often depict a dog on one side, and a woman's head on the other, which have traditionally been associated with Crinisus and the eponymous Segesta.

== Myth ==
Lycophron's Alexandra contains the first known version of this myth. When Troy was under attack from a sea monster, king Laomedon instructed mariners to take the three daughters of Phoenodamas to die of exposure and be devoured by wild beasts. They were taken to Sicily, but survived there, and built a great shrine to Aphrodite in thanks. The River Crimissus, in the likeness of a dog, took one of them (not named by Lycophron) as his bride, and had a son with her. Their son (also not named here) became the "settler and founder of three places" (generally considered to be Segesta, Eryx, and Entella), and guided Elymus from Dardanus to western Sicily. He concludes by saying that the people of Aegesta (Segesta) continue to mourn the loss of Troy long after its destruction (Alexandra, 951–977).

Virgil's Aeneid briefly describes Acestes as being "born of a Trojan mother to the river god Crinisus" (Aeneid, 5.38), and Gaius Julius Hyginus also calls Acestes "son of the river Crinisus" (Fabulae, 273).

Servius the Grammarian's commentary on the Aeneid gives the most complete version of the myth. After Neptune and Apollo built the walls of Troy, and were refused their promised reward by king Laomedon, Neptune sent sea monsters to the city, and Apollo decreed that the daughters of the nobility should be attacked by them. Fearing for his daughter Egesta, Hippotes (or Isostratus) sent her away from Troy in a ship, which was carried to Sicily on winds sent by the River Crimissus. Crimissus turned into a bear or a dog and mated with her, producing Egestus, who founded the Trojan city of Egesta there, named after his mother, which later became known as Segesta. Servius also notes that Virgil used poetic license to change the river god's name from Crimissus to Crinisus, and his son's name from Egestus to Acestes (Commentary on the Aeneid, 1.550).

In contrast to this, Claudius Aelianus' Varia Historia stated that the people of Segesta "honour the Porpax, Crimisus, and Telmessus in the form of men" (Varia Historia, 2.33).

Dionysius of Halicarnassus' Roman Antiquities has a different version of the story, with Acestes' father as "a youth of distinguished family", who was in love with Acestes' mother, accompanied her from Troy, and married her when they arrived in Sicily (Roman Antiquities, 1.52.1–4).

== Coins ==
Ancient coins from Segesta often have a dog on one side, and the head of a woman on the other. The similarity between these images and the Crinisus myth has led to academic debate about whether or not they depict Crinisus and the eponymous Segesta.

Coins of this type originated from Segesta after the defeat of the Carthiginians at the Battle of Himera in 480 BCE. The first of these coins are didrachmas produced from 475 BCE, which show a dog sniffing the ground; from 460 BCE they also produced coins with a dog looking back, from 455 BCE looking forward, and from 430 BCE following a scent. Around 415–400 BCE, new designs started to appear, such as litra with a standing dog with a shell and a gorgoneion or solar head on one side, and a three-quarter woman's head surrounded by a laurel wreath on the other. From 412/410–400 BCE, hunting scenes appear, such as a dog carrying the head of a deer on didrachmas, hunting a hare on smaller denominations, and a hunter (sometimes identified as Crinisus) accompanied by a dog. This may reflect increasingly aggressive attitudes between the settlements of western Sicily around this time, including territorial disputes between Segesta and Selinunte. Coins with these dog motifs continued to be produced until around 390 BCE.

These Segestan designs spread to Eryx by 460 BCE, and Panormus and Motya from 430 BCE. Around 415 BCE, a coin from Alikai depicts a nymph sacrificing a dog or wolf on an altar, and litrae from Eryx at the same time show a dog standing proudly on one side, and on the other a full-length Aphrodite seated on a chair, and either holding a dove or stretching her hand out to Eros, who crowns her.

Numismatists traditionally considered the woman to depict a local nymph, the eponymous Segesta, though Karl Galinsky argues that it may be the goddess Artemis, who Cicero reported had a famous statue at Segesta. Aphrodite Urania has also been suggested.
