= Entella =

Human settlement in Italy

Coordinates: 37.774051°N 13.121900°E

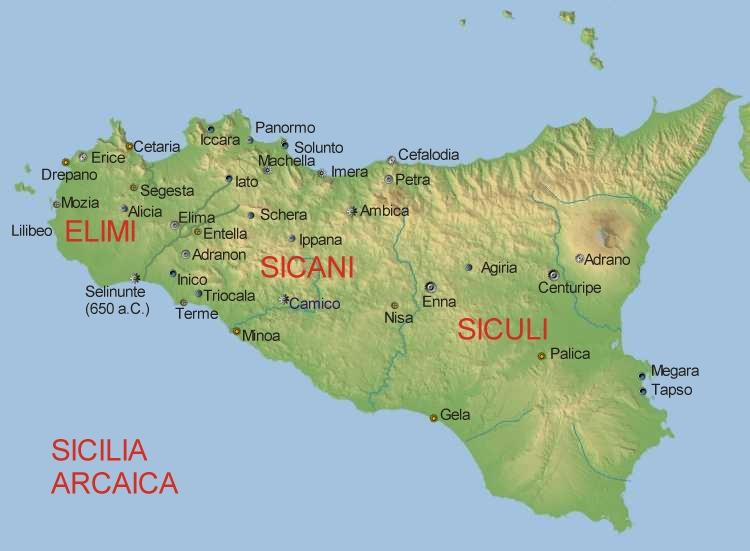
Ancient Pre-Hellenic Sicily

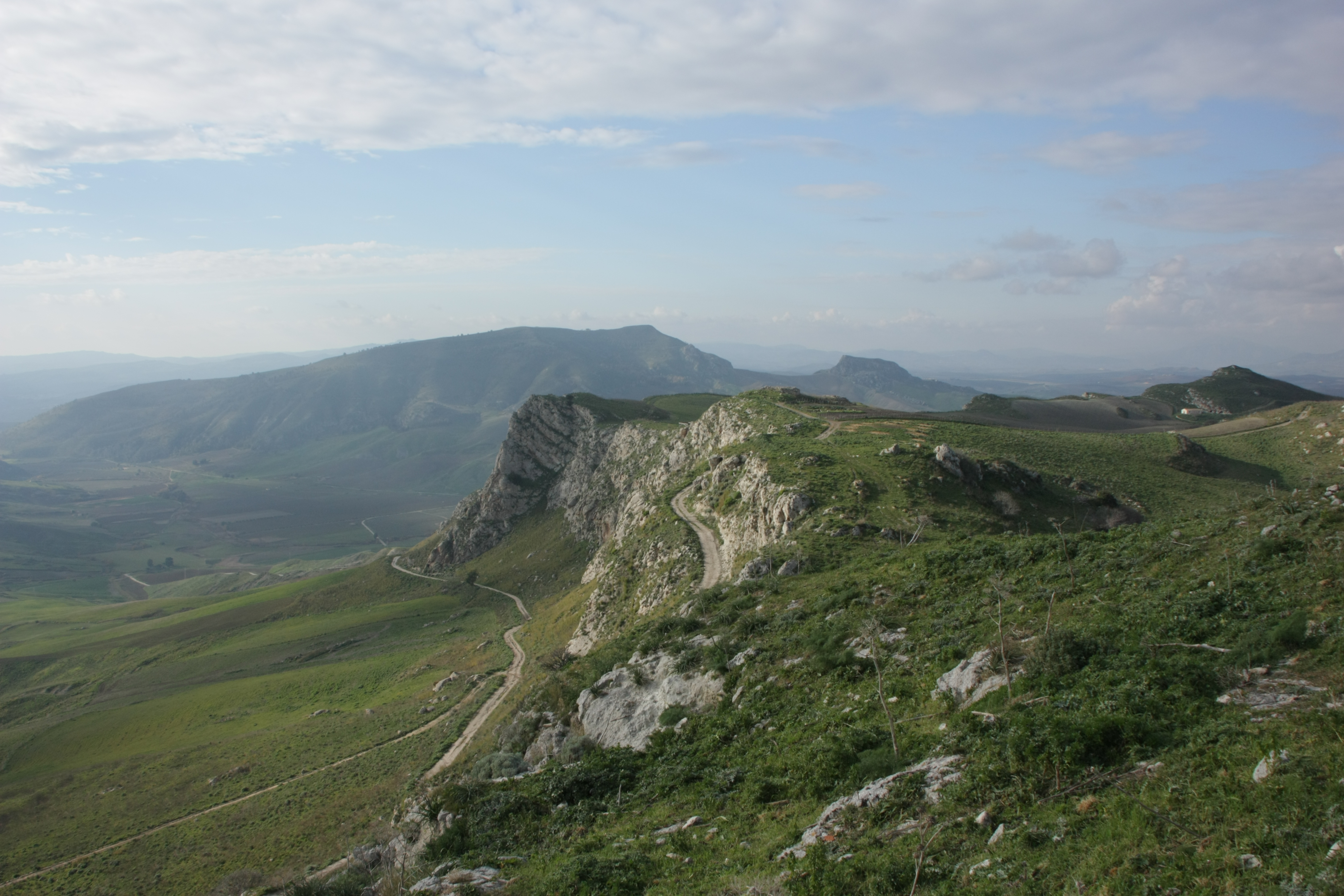
Rocca di Entella - Site of Entella

Éntella (Greek: Ἔντελλα), was an ancient city in the interior of Sicily, situated on the left bank of the river Hypsas (modern Belice), and nearly midway between the two seas, being about 40 km from the mouth of the Hypsas, and much about the same distance from the north coast of the island, at the Gulf of Castellamare.

== History ==
It was apparently of Sicanian origin, though the traditions concerning its foundation connected it with the Elymi and the supposed Trojan colony. According to some writers it was founded by Acestes, and named after his wife Entella, a tradition to which Silius Italicus alludes, while others ascribed its foundation to Elymus, and Virgil represents Entellus (evidently the eponymous hero of the city) as a friend and comrade of Acestes. It was, together with Erice and Segesta, among the most important centres of the Elymians. Thucydides, however, says Eryx and Egesta were the only two cities of the Elymi, and does not notice Entella at all, any more than the other places of native Sicanian or Siculian origin.

The first historical mention of Entella is found in Diodorus, who tells us that in 404 BC the 1200 Campanian mercenaries, who had been in the service of the Carthaginians during the war, having been admitted into the city on friendly terms, turned their arms against the inhabitants, put all the male citizens to the sword, and made themselves masters of the place, of which they retained possession for many years. During the subsequent wars of Dionysius with the Carthaginians, the Campanian occupants of Entella sided with their former masters, and even continued faithful to their alliance in 396 BC, when all the cities of Sicily except five went over to that of Dionysius.

It was not until 368 BC that the Syracusan despot was able to reduce Entella; the city appears to have still remained in the hands of the Campanians, but was now hostile to the Carthaginians, who (in 345 BC) in consequence ravaged its territory, and blockaded the city itself. Soon after we find the latter apparently in their hands, but it was recovered by Timoleon, who restored it to liberty and independence.

From this time we hear little more of it. The name is only incidentally mentioned during the First Punic War, and was abandoned and took no part in the struggles between Rome and Carthage. It was repopulated after the war with refugees and prisoners of war, as indicated by the Entella Decrees, who were Campanians and descendants of the mercenaries who settled in the city in the fifth century BC, and was a tolerably flourishing municipium: its territory was fertile in wine as well as corn, and Cicero praises the inhabitants for their industry in its cultivation. It later, like most of the cities of Sicily, suffered severely from the exactions of Verres.

We still find its name both in Pliny (among the populi stipendiarii) and Ptolemy but no further notice of it is found in ancient authors.

It however continued to subsist throughout the Middle Ages, until the 13th century, when, having been converted into a stronghold by the Saracens, it was taken by the emperor Frederick II and utterly destroyed, the inhabitants being removed to Lucera in Apulia.

== The Site ==
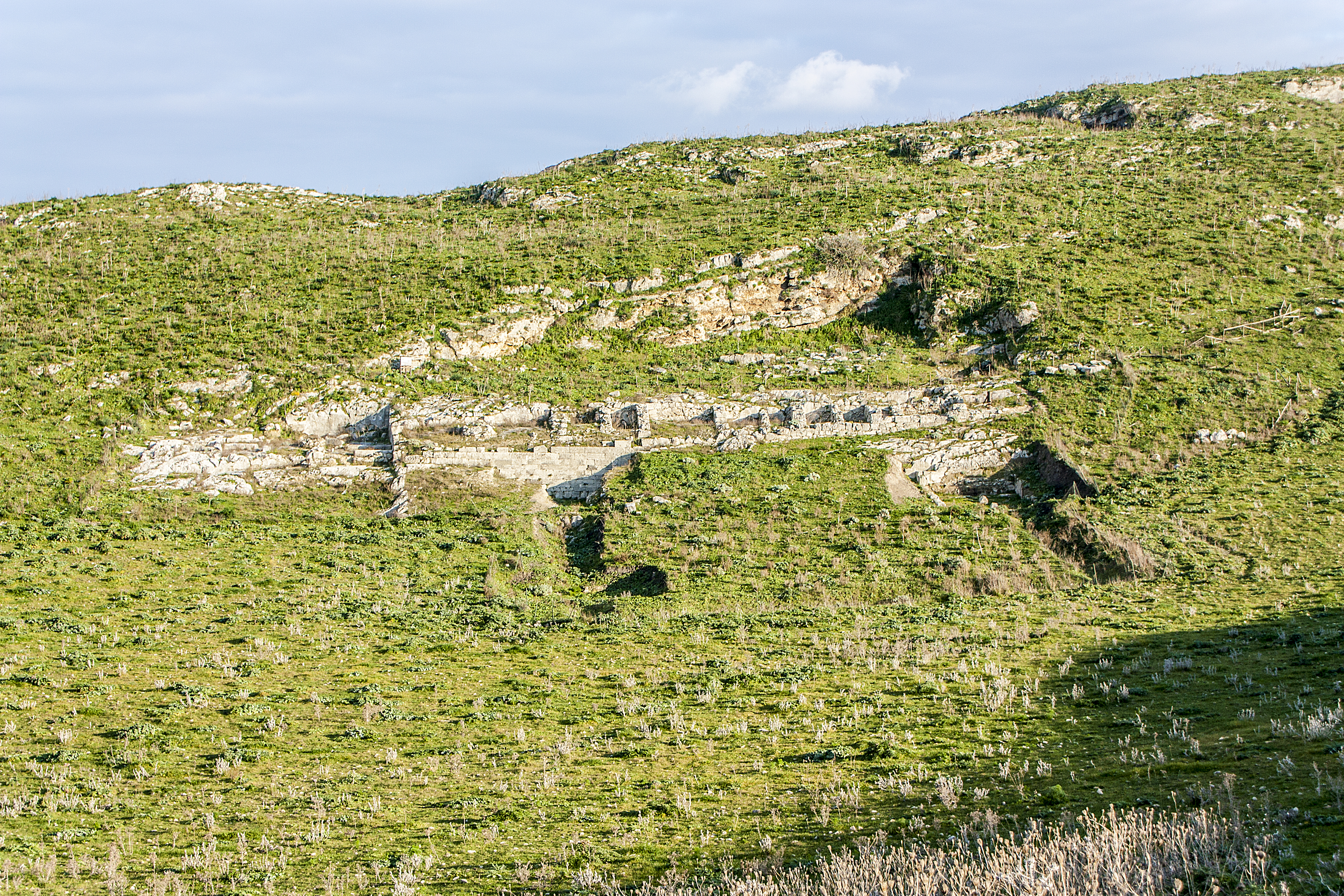
The Agora

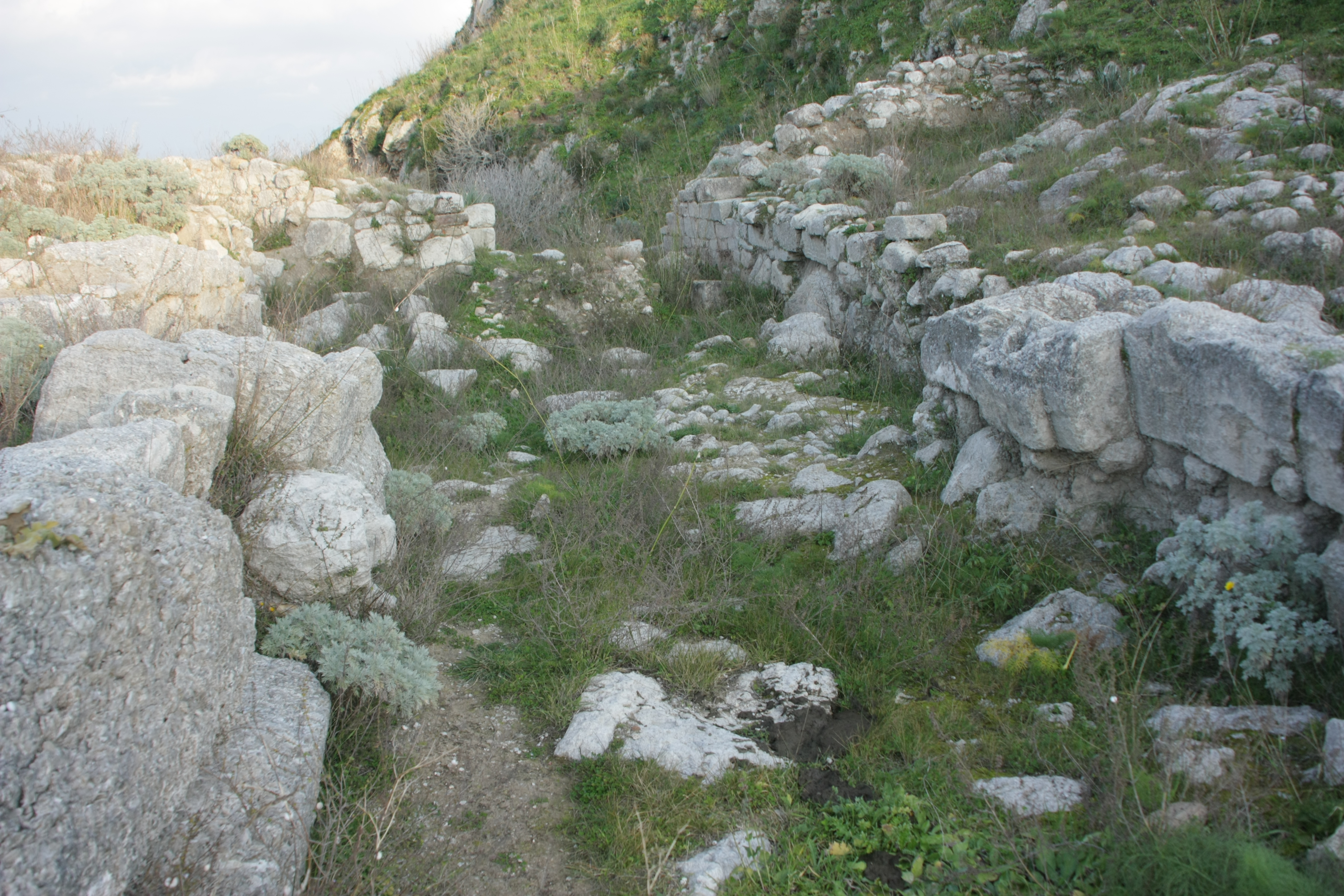
North gate

The site, which still retained its ancient name in the days of Fazello, is described by him as a position of great natural strength, surrounded by abrupt precipices on all sides but one, but having a table land of considerable extent on its summit. Its location at Rocca d'Entella, in the comune of Contessa Entellina, stands at an angle of the Belice, so that that river encircles it on the north and west.

Excavations show that the cult of Demeter and Kore is attested from the 5th to the 3rd century BC in the sanctuary outside the walls. Most of the tombs in the necropolis "A" date back to the Hellenistic age, as shown by the type of burial and the pottery and the famous inscriptions on bronze tablets with the decrees of the cities of Entella and Nakone, in the Salinas Archaeological Museum in Palermo.

=== The walls ===
An approximately 2800 m long wall protected the north side, most easily accessible from the valley and from the branch of the Belice river (ancient Crimisio); on the south, east and west sides, on the other hand, the rocky walls offer a natural defense. At the junction of the two valleys are gates to the hill of Rocca. The North West gate was accessed by a road, still intact, which winds along the slopes of Cozzo Petraro.

=== The agora ===
In the eastern valley are imposing remains of public buildings: a temple without peristasis (oikos) with an internal altar from the first decades of the 5th century BC, and a granary built at the end of the 4th century and destroyed by a fire in the middle of the 3rd century BC. These two buildings were aligned along the eastern side of the agora.

== Finds ==
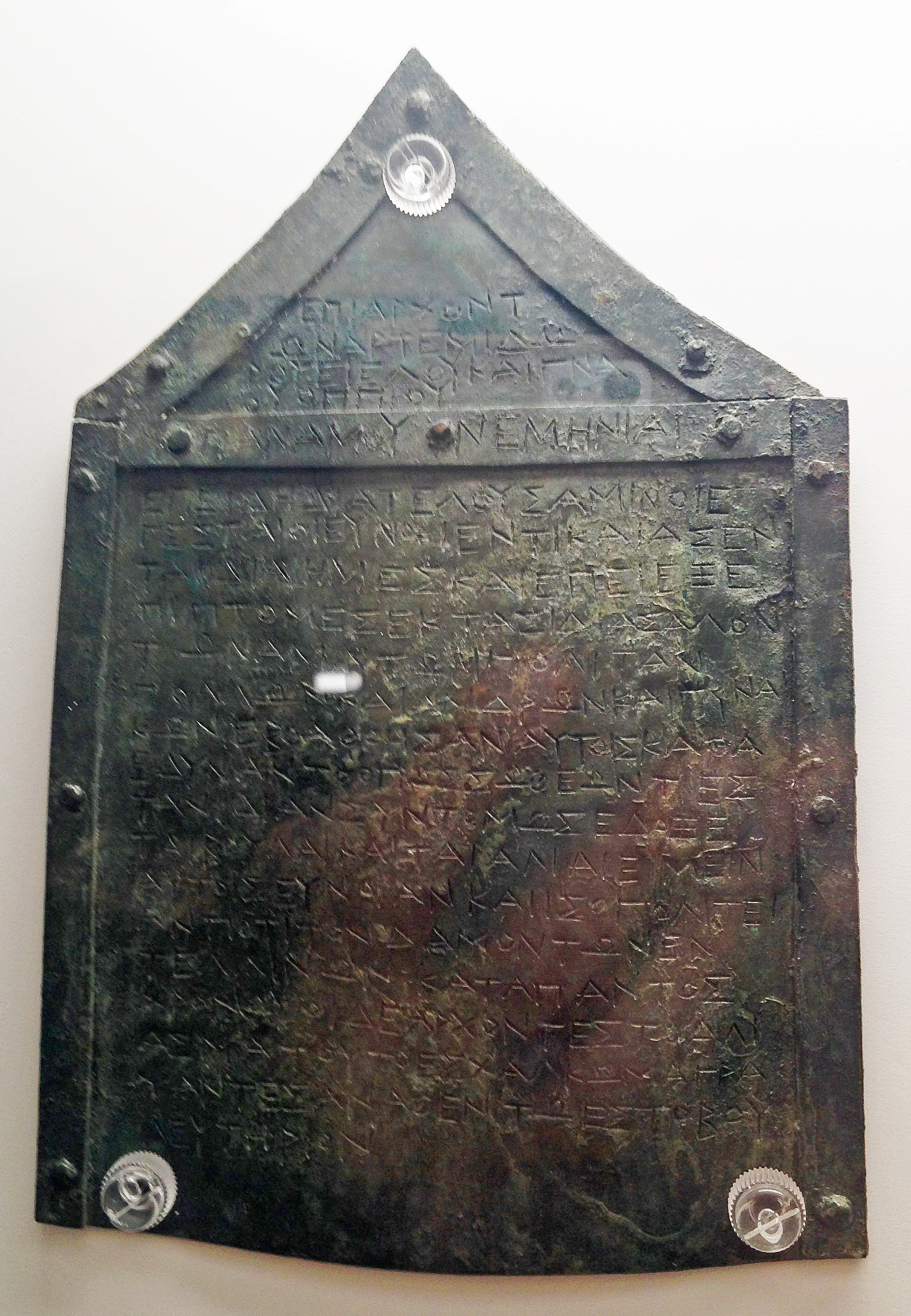
Decree of Entella

Around 1970 in the area around the town of Contessa Entellina, eight bronze tablets known as the Entella Decrees were found in which reference is made to the Campanians who made up the population of Entella in the mid-third century BC and who were the descendants of 1200 mercenaries who settled in the city in the fifth century BC. The characters used on the tablets are Greek, but the language spoken by Elimi was Annellenic. Seven of them contained decrees of the city of Entella. The date of the tablets is not certain; but they seem to belong either to the late 4th century or the middle of the 3rd century BC.

There are extant coins of Entella, with the legend ΕΝΤΕΛΛΙΝΩΝ at full; while others struck under the Campanian occupation of the city have ΕΝΤΕΛΛΑΣ, and on the reverse ΚΑΜΠΑΝΩΝ.
