= Elymus (mythology) =

Greek and Roman mythological figure

Elymus (Ancient Greek: Ἔλυμος, romanized: Élymos) was the supposed Trojan ancestor of the Elymians (Ἔλυμοι), an indigenous people of Sicily, in Greek and Roman legend.

== Legends ==
Elymus was an illegitimate son of Anchises. Previous to the emigration of Aeneas, his half-brother, Elymus and fellow Trojan Acestes had fled from Troy to Sicily. They settled on the banks of the river Crinisus, in the country of the Sicani. They briefly returned with the blessing of Priam to fight in the Trojan War, but fled back to Sicily when the city was about to be taken, using three ships that Achilles had previously lost. When afterwards the Trojan refugees led by Aeneas arrived there, Elymus built for them the towns of Segesta and Elyme. The Trojans who settled in that part of Sicily called themselves Elymi, after Elymus.

Strabo calls him Elymnus, and says that he went to Sicily with Aeneas, and that they together took possession of the cities of Eryx and Lilybaeum. Elymus was further believed to have founded Asca and Entella in Sicily.

In the Aeneid, Vergil has Elymnus competing in the funeral games held on Sicily for Anchises, in the footrace in which Nisus and Euryalus are introduced. As Helymus, he is also listed among the competitors by Hyginus, who says he finished second to Euryalus and was awarded an Amazonian quiver.
