= In the Walls of Eryx =

Short story by H. P. Lovecraft and Kenneth Sterling

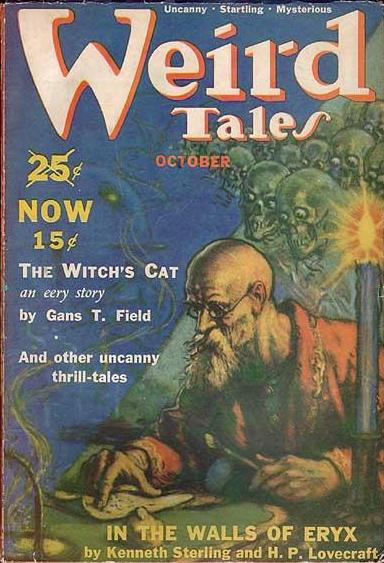
Cover of Weird Tales issue of October 1939, where the story first appeared.

"In the Walls of Eryx" is a short story by American writers H. P. Lovecraft and Kenneth J. Sterling, written in January 1936 and first published in Weird Tales magazine in October 1939. It is a science fiction story involving space exploration in the near future.

== Plot ==
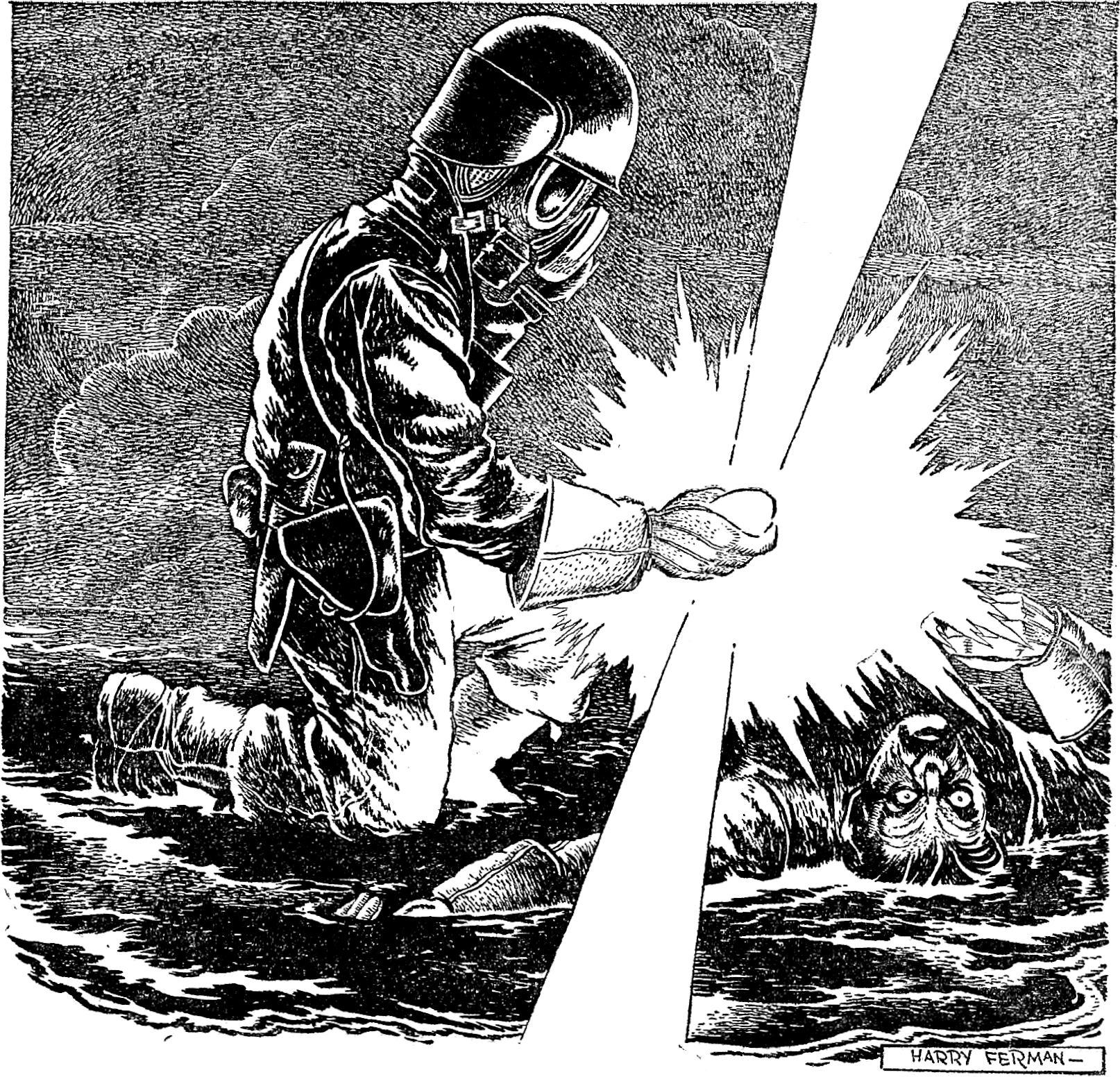
Illustration to the first edition of the story, by Harry Ferman.

The story, written in first-person narrative, describes an incident in which a prospector, working on the planet Venus for a mining company, becomes trapped in an invisible maze.

The story is mainly in the form of a report written by a prospector, Kenton J. Stanfield. A short segment at the end on the story is written by another character, who describes events following on from the earlier report.

The events depicted take place in the future, when humanity has developed space travel and begun to explore Venus. There, they discover valuable crystal orbs that can be used as a source of electrical power, as well as a race of primitive "man-lizards" who guard the crystals fervently and who attack any humans who try to take them.

The protagonist, Stanfield, is one of many explorers employed to collect the crystals. He is equipped with a breathing apparatus fueled by oxygen cubes (as Venus' atmosphere cannot sustain human life) and has a leather protective suit, as well as a "flame pistol" to use against man-lizards.

While on a routine mission the narrator encounters a mysterious, invisible building, inside of which is the body of a dead prospector who is clutching an unusually large crystal. The protagonist enters the building and collects the crystal, discovering along the way that the interior has a number of walls and corridors. Out of curiosity he makes his way through the building to its central chamber, but soon discovers that he has underestimated the complexity of the structure, and struggles to make his way back to the entry point. Over the coming days the narrator realises that the structure is in fact an enormous maze that has been designed by the man-lizards to ensnare unwary prospectors.

Trapped in the maze, the narrator's oxygen and water supply steadily begins to run out, and man-lizards gather at the outside of the maze to observe and mock him. The narrator begins to grasp the religious significance of the crystals to the man-lizards, and also realizes that the maze's construction and purpose indicate that the man-lizards are in fact more intelligent than humans have supposed. In time he realizes that he will face the same fate as the preceding prospector.

The story seems to suggest that the structure of the maze is actually changing its form as the narrator struggles to find his way out, meaning that despite all his efforts, there is never any possibility that he will escape. The man-lizards seem to know this, and while the narrator himself never gains this understanding, he nonetheless senses that they know something about his situation that he does not, writing that they “share some terrible joke that is just beyond my perception”.

Dying, the narrator describes how in his last moments he has developed a feeling of kinship with the man-lizards, and pleads with his superiors to leave Venus, the man-lizards, and the crystals alone, as they hold mysteries humanity cannot begin to grasp, and mankind does not really need to exploit them.

The narrator's testimony, along with his body, are soon recovered by a search party, who discover an additional exit just behind the ground where Stanfield died, which the prospector missed when attempting to map out the maze. However, his dying pleas for humanity to leave Venus alone are dismissed by his employers as unfortunate dementia caused by his desperate situation, and instead the crystal mining company decides to use draconian measures to annihilate the man-lizards completely.

== Analysis ==
The name of the story's main character, Kenton J. Stanfield, closely resembles that of its co-author, Kenneth J. Sterling. Eryx, or the Erycinian Highland, is a (fictional) vast plateau on Venus. Unlike the actual planet, Lovecraft's Venus has a tropical climate and is filled with lush, swampy jungles, though its atmosphere is poisonous to humans, while at the same time not so dangerous as to require hermetically sealed space suits.

The themes of prejudice, religious intolerance, and discrimination are evident in the story. The references in the story to "wriggling akmans" and "efjeh-weeds" are believed to be jokes aimed at Forrest J Ackerman, a correspondent with whom Lovecraft feuded over Ackerman's criticism of a Clark Ashton Smith story.

The story contains several other in-jokes, including references to "farnoth flies" (for Weird Tales editor Farnsworth Wright) and "ugrats" (derived from "Hugo the Rat", Lovecraft's unaffectionate nickname for Wonder Stories editor Hugo Gernsback).

Given Lovecraft's views on space travel in his letters and nonfiction, a likely setting for the story is the early twenty-second century. While not typically associated with what became termed the "Cthulhu Mythos", it is not inconsistent with it, and has less difficulty being reconciled than "The Diary of Alonzo Typer" with its Theosophy-inspired use of the Lords of Venus.

== Writing ==
Sterling, a precocious Providence high school student who had befriended Lovecraft the previous year, gave Lovecraft a draft of the story in January 1936. This draft included the idea of an invisible maze—a concept Sterling recalled as being derived from the story "The Monster-God of Mamurth" by Edmond Hamilton, published in the August 1926 issue of Weird Tales, which featured an invisible building in the Sahara Desert.

Lovecraft thoroughly rewrote Sterling's draft, lengthening the story to 12,000 words (from an original 6,000–8,000). Though the original draft does not survive, most of the prose in the published version is believed to be Lovecraft's.

Edward Guimont and Horace A. Smith argue that influences on Lovecraft's rewrite seem to draw from his 1915 nonfiction article "The Inferior Planets," his unpublished backstory notes for the planet Yekub from the 1935 round robin story "The Challenge from Beyond," and Olaf Stapledon's 1930 novel Last and First Men.

Russell J. Hawley notes that the man-lizards are part of a long literary tradition of establishing dinosaur-like creatures on a "swampy Venus."

== Reception ==
The story seems to have been rejected by Weird Tales, Astounding Stories, Blue Book, Argosy, Wonder Stories, and possibly Amazing Stories. After Lovecraft's death, it was resubmitted to Weird Tales and finally published in its October 1939 issue.

Guimont and Smith have noted the parallel similarities to Venus as depicted in Lovecraft's story and two other works, Robert A. Heinlein's "Logic of Empire" (1941) and C. S. Lewis' Perelandra (1943).

== Reprints ==
The tale was republished in 2012 in Medusa's Coil and Others.

== Sources ==
- Lovecraft, Howard P.; Kenneth Sterling (1986) [1939]. "In the Walls of Eryx". In S. T. Joshi (ed.). Dagon and Other Macabre Tales (9th corrected printing ed.). Sauk City: Arkham House. ISBN 978-0-87054-039-4. Definitive version.
- Edward Guimont and Horace A. Smith, When the Stars Are Right: H. P. Lovecraft and Astronomy (New York: Hippocampus Press, 2023).
- Russell J. Hawley, “Dinosaurs on Venus!” Prehistoric Times, No. 116 (2016): 46–47.
