= Kenneth Sterling =

Doctor and researcher

Kenneth J. Sterling
- Born: July 29, 1920; Baltimore, Maryland, US
- Died: January 12, 1995 (aged 74); Riverdale, New York, US
- Education: Harvard University
- Alma mater: Johns Hopkins School of Medicine
- Known for: Thyroxine conversion to triiodothyronine
- Awards: William S. Middleton Award for Excellence in Research
- Scientific career
- Fields: Clinical research
- Workplaces: Columbia-Presbyterian Medical Center, James J. Peters VA Medical Center

Kenneth J. Sterling (July 29, 1920 – January 12, 1995) was a medical doctor and prominent researcher on the topic of thyroid hormone and human metabolism. He made significant discoveries on thyroid hormone activation and treated patients at the Columbia-Presbyterian Medical Center for over thirty years.

== Early life and friendship with H. P. Lovecraft ==
Sterling was born in Baltimore, Maryland in 1920.

At the age of 14, Sterling became acquainted with H.P. Lovecraft when his family moved to Providence and he began attending Classical High School. He saw Lovecraft frequently during this time (1935–36), then corresponded with him when he went to Harvard in the fall of 1936. he collaborated with Lovecraft on "In the Walls of Eryx" (January 1936). Aside from the early memoir, "Lovecraft and Science" (in Marginalia), 1944, Sterling wrote the poignant reminiscent article "Caverns Measureless to Man" (Science-Fantasy Correspondent, 1975) about Lovecraft. This article quoted extensively from his letters to Lovecraft, which have not otherwise been widely available. It is hoped that his heirs will deposit these letters in an institution in the course of time. Lovecraft's letters to Sterling as based on transcripts held by Arkham House have been published in the volume H. P:. Lovecraft, Letters to Robert Bloch and Others, ed. David E. Schultz and S. T. Joshi. NY: Hippocampus Press, 2015.

When he was sixteen, Sterling enrolled in the undergraduate program at Harvard University, from which he graduated in 1940. As an undergraduate student, he published his first scientific paper at the age of 19.

Sterling then went to Johns Hopkins School of Medicine, where he earned his medical degree in 1943 at the age of 23.

== Career ==
In 1958, Sterling joined Columbia University as a research associate at the College of Physicians & Surgeons. In 1962 he was appointed assistant clinical professor of medicine and became staff physician in nuclear medicine and director of the protein research laboratory at the Department of Veterans' Affairs Medical Center in the Bronx, New York City. In 1970, Sterling became associate clinical professor of medicine, later rising to full clinical professor in 1974.

== Research impact ==
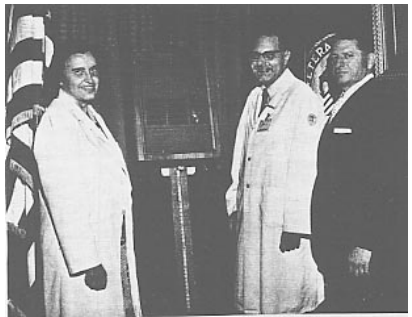
Kenneth Sterling, M.D. (center), receiving the Middleton Award with Rosalyn Yalow, Ph.D. (left) and Bronx VA Medical Center Director, Harold Jaffrey (right)

Sterling was one of the first researchers to use radioactive iodine to treat thyroid diseases. He used radioisotopic labels to study the metabolism of human serum proteins and red blood cells. He discovered that the body converts the pro-hormone thyroxine into triiodothyronine, the primary active form of thyroid hormone. This breakthrough led to a new field of thyroid hormone research and led to the first early studies on the mechanism of action of thyroid hormones. Sterling developed the equilibrium dialysis method for measuring free thyroxine, which remains the gold standard for evaluating free hormone levels in blood today. Sterling was a pioneering investigator identifying mitochondrial thyroid hormone receptors, shortened isoforms of the full-length, nuclear receptors. He wrote a chapter on thyroid hormone receptors in the fifth edition of Werner's The Thyroid: A Fundamental and Clinical Text, which is known as "the bible of modern thyroidology."

In 1972, Sterling was awarded the William S. Middleton Award for Excellence in Research, the highest honor of the VA Medical Center. He was cited for developing the ^{51}Cr labeling of red blood cells for clinical applications.

== Death ==
Sterling continued treating patients at the Columbia-Presbyterian Medical Center up until a few days before he died. He died on January 12, 1995, while at his home in Riverdale, New York, at the age of 74. The probable cause of death was complications of an aneurysm. The International Workshop on Resistance to Thyroid Hormone, a biannual research forum, dedicated its third meeting to Sterling in 1997.

== Notable publications ==
- Sterling, K., Brenner, M.A. (1966) Free thyroxine in human serum: simplified measurement with the aid of magnesium precipitation. Journal of Clinical Investigation.
- Sterling, K., Bellabarba, D., Newman, E.S., Brenner, M.A. (1969) Determination of triiodothyronine concentration in human serum. Journal of Clinical Investigation.
- Sterling, K., Brenner, M.A., Newman, E.S. (1970) Conversion of thyroxine to triiodothyronine in normal human subjects. Science.
- Braverman, L.E., Ingbar, S.H., (1970) Sterling, K. Conversion of thyroxine (T4) to triiodothyronine (T3) in athyreotic human subjects. Journal of Clinical Investigation.
- Sterling, K., Brenner, M.A., Saldanha, V.F. (1973) Conversion of thyroxine to triiodothyronine by cultured human cells. Science.
- Sterling, K., Saldanha, V.F., Brenner, M.A., Milch, P.O. (1974) Cytosol-binding protein of thyroxine and triiodothyronine in human and rat kidney tissue. Nature.
- Sterling, K., Milch, P.O., Brenner, M.A., Lazarus, J.H. (1977) Thyroid hormone action: the mitochondrial pathway. Science.
- Sterling, K., Lazarus, J.H., Milch, P.O., Sakurada, T., Brenner, M.A. (1978) Mitochondrial thyroid hormone receptor: localization and physiological significance. Science.
- Sterling, K., Brenner, M.A., Sakurada, T. (1980) Rapid effect of triiodothyronine on the mitochondrial pathway in rat liver in vivo. Science.
