= Crinisus (river) =

Crimisus or Crinisus (modern Freddo)

Location
- Country: Sicily

Physical characteristics
- Mouth
  - location: Tyrrhenian Sea
- Length: 23 km (14 mi)?

Crimisus or Crinisus is an ancient Greek river name in Sicily. The name was derived from Crinisus and it corresponds either to the modern Freddo or Caltabellota in northwest Sicily. It is formed by two rivers that meet at about 8 kilometres (5 mi) from Castellammare del Golfo in the province of Trapani. The western river starts from Monte Busecchio near Calatafimi and the eastern river from the Gola di Sorice near Alcamo. The two rivers are also traditionally called the "hot river" (western) and the "cold river" (eastern) and in Italian language the Crinisus is called Fiume Freddo that means cold river.

The Battle of the Crimissus, fought at a crossing of this river, was an important turning point in the ancient world between Carthage and the Greek City State of Syracuse in 339 BC.
