= Entellus =

Figure from Vergil's Aeneid

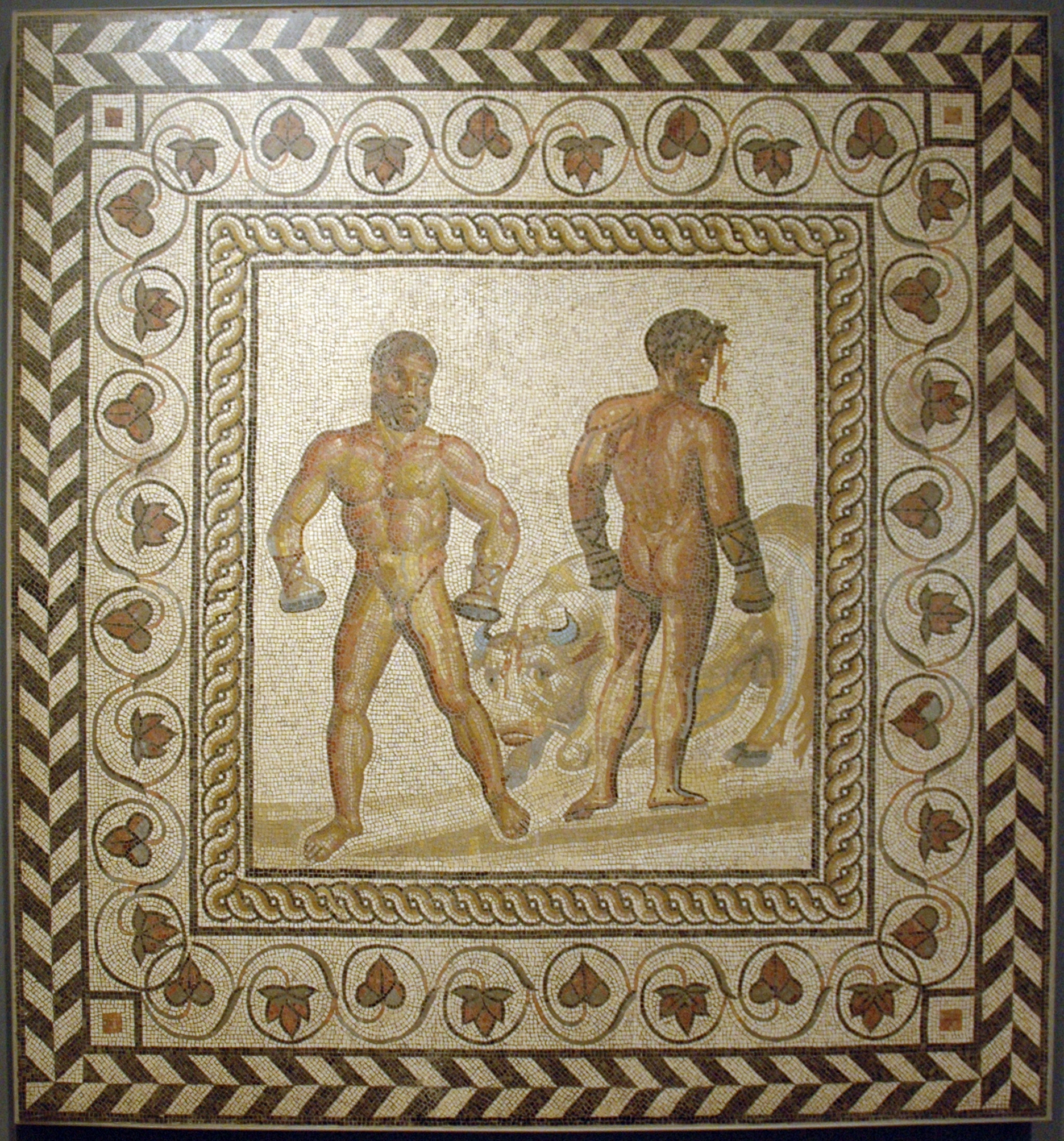
Fight between Entellus and Dares, Roman mosaic, c. 175, Getty Villa (71.AH.106)

Entellus (/ɪnˈtɛləs, ɛn-/) was a Trojan or Sicilian hero from whom the town of Entella in Sicily was believed to have received its name. He was a friend of the Trojan king Acestes. A boxing match between Entellus and an arrogant younger boxer, Dares, is described in the fifth book of Virgil's Aeneid.

Entellus is the namesake of the Gray langur Presbytis entellus.

== See also ==
- List of mortals in Greek mythology
