= Eryx (mythology) =

Multiple Greek mythological figures

In Greek mythology, Eryx (Ancient Greek: Ἔρυξ) may refer to the following personages:

- Eryx, a king of the city of Eryx in Sicily. He was either the son of Poseidon or of Aphrodite and Butes the Argonaut of the Elymian people of Sicily who she spent several nights with at Lilybaeum to make Adonis jealous. Eryx was an excellent boxer but died when Heracles beat him in a match.
- Eryx, one of the supporters of Phineus. He was turned to stone by Perseus with the head of the Gorgon Medusa.
