= 1001 to 1600 in sports =

By 1600, rural folk in Great Britain had begun to play early versions of cricket, football and golf. Early in the 16th century, English public houses were showing interest in bowls and real tennis, as well as dice and cards, all of which the government tried to eliminate forcefully. According to Derek Birley, it was late in the 16th century that "licensing began to replace prohibition ... a public house might be licensed to allow men of substance to engage in dice, cards, tables, bowls, and tennis on condition that there was no blaspheming or swearing, and no play before noon on working days or during hours of religious worship on Sundays".

== Bandy ==
Events

- c.1001–c.1100 — games that are accepted as direct predecessors to bandy have been recorded in Russian monastery records dating back to this period.

== Boxing ==
Events

- Having been popular in both ancient Greece and ancient Rome, boxing was apparently in centuries-long decline following the rise of Christianity after the fall of the Roman Empire.

== "Creag" ==
Speculation

- 10 March 1301 — an expenses paid item in the English royal accounts confirms that the Edward II of England, then the Prince of Wales – aged 15, was playing a game called creag at Newenden, Kent. Despite speculation that creag was an early form of cricket, there is no supportive evidence and it is much more likely that the word is an early spelling of craic, meaning "fun and games" in general, though it does confirm that games were being played, if only among aristocrats, at the end of the 13th century.

== Cricket ==
Events

- 11th to 13th centuries — the most widely accepted theory about the origin of cricket is that it developed among children in south-east England sometime before 1300.
- 17 January 1597 — a court of law in Guildford heard from a 59-year-old coroner, John Derrick, who gave witness that when he was a scholar at the "Free School at Guildford", fifty years earlier, "hee and diverse of his fellows did runne and play at creckett and other plaies [sic]" on common land which was the subject of the current legal dispute, confirming that the sport was played there by schoolboys c.1550. It is perhaps significant that cricket is the only one of the "plaies" to be specifically named.
- 1598 – reference to cricket in an Italian-English dictionary by Giovanni Florio. His definition of the word sgillare is: "to make a noise as a cricket, to play cricket-a-wicket, and be merry"; Florio is the first writer known to have defined "cricket" in terms of both an insect and a game.

== Curling ==
Events

- 1511 — evidence that curling existed in Scotland in the early 16th century includes a curling stone inscribed with the date 1511 uncovered (along with another bearing the date 1551) when an old pond was drained at Dunblane.
- February 1541 — the first written reference to a contest using stones on ice comes from the records of Paisley Abbey, Renfrewshire.
- 1565 — two paintings by Pieter Bruegel the Elder, called Winter Landscape with Ice skaters and Bird trap and The Hunters in the Snow depict Dutch peasants curling.

== Football ==
Events

- Medieval England — huge rise in popularity of annual Shrovetide football matches, sometimes referred to as "mob football", which were played between neighbouring towns and villages, involving an unlimited number of players on opposing teams who would clash en masse,
- c.1180 — William FitzStephen described London youths playing mob football on Shrove Tuesday.
- 1308 — football was played at Newcastle, County Down, where a spectator was stabbed during a game.
- 1314 — Nicholas de Farndone, Lord Mayor of the City of London issued a decree banning football.
- 1349 — King Edward III of England issued a proclamation banning "...handball, football, or hockey; coursing and cock-fighting, or other such idle games".
- 1424 — the Scottish Parliament of James I banned 'fute-ball' in the Football Act 1424.
- 16th century — Calcio Fiorentino began in Florence.

== Golf ==
Theory of origin

- 12th century — the most widely accepted theory is that golf (as practiced today) originates from Scotland in the 12th century with shepherds knocking stones into rabbit holes on the site now occupied by The Royal and Ancient Golf Club of St Andrews. The real origin of golf, however, is uncertain and open to debate.

== Horse racing ==
Events

- 1174 — the first recorded race meeting in England was during the reign of Henry II at Smithfield, London during a horse fair.
- 1512 — it is believed that the first occurrence of a trophy being presented to the winner of a race was by organisers of a fair in Chester; it was a small wooden bat or a ball decorated with flowers.
- early 16th century — Henry VIII imported a large number of stallions and mares for breeding, although it was not until the 17th and 18th centuries that modern methods of thoroughbred breeding were introduced.

== Mesoamerican ballgame ==
Events

- 1528 — soon after the Spanish conquest, Hernán Cortés sent a troupe of ōllamanime (ballplayers) to Spain to perform for Charles V where they were drawn by the German Christoph Weiditz. Besides the fascination with their exotic visitors, the Europeans were amazed by the bouncing rubber balls.
