= 1701 to 1725 in sports =

The beginning of the 18th century saw sport acquire increasing importance in the lives of people in England and Ireland. Professionalism was by then established in the major gambling sports of bare-knuckle boxing, cricket and horse racing.

== Bandy ==
Events

- A game that is recognisable as modern bandy was played in Russia by the early 18th century, although the rules in use differed from those devised in England in the 1880s. In Russia, bandy is known as "hockey with a ball" or simply "Russian hockey". The game became popular among the nobility with the royal court of Peter I the Great playing bandy on Saint Petersburg's frozen Neva river. Russians played bandy with sticks made out of juniper wood, later adopting skates.

== Boxing ==
Events

- 1710 – While attending a boxing match in London, Zacharias Conrad von Uffenbach encounters a woman who claims to have fought a public women's boxing match c. 1708. Uffenbach's account is one of the earliest known references to women's boxing.
- 1719 – James Figg opens one of the first indoor venues for combat sports, adjoining the City of Oxford tavern in Oxford Road, London.
- June 1722 – Elizabeth Wilkinson and Hannah Hyfield fight one of the earliest advertised women's boxing matches in London.
- 20 January 1725 – James Figg hosts the first recorded international boxing match, fought between English livestock drover Bob Whitaker and Venetian gondolier Alberto di Carni in London.

== Chess ==
- By the beginning of the 18th century, France was the main centre of European chess.

== Cricket ==
Events

- 29 June 1709 — Kent v Surrey, the earliest known inter-county match. It was, however, probably a match between two parish teams either side of the county boundary.
- 1 September 1718 — London v Rochester Punch Club at White Conduit Fields was abandoned after three Rochester players made "an elopement" in an attempt to have the game declared incomplete so that they would retain their stake money. A noted lawsuit was opened by the London players in pursuance of their winnings and the judge ordered that the match be "played out".
- July 1719 — as ordered by the court, the London v Rochester match was completed and London won by 21 runs.
- 1721 — mariners of the British East India Company reported to be playing cricket at Khambhat (then Cambay) in western India, the earliest known reference to cricket in the Indian sub-continent.
- 1724 — earliest mention of Edwin Stead, the noted patron of Kent county cricket; under his leadership, Kent was the most successful team of the 1720s. William Bedle, described in his 1768 obituary notice as "the most expert cricket player in England", played for Kent at this time.
- 1725 — earliest mentions in a cricket connection of the noted Sussex patrons Sir William Gage, 7th Baronet and Charles Lennox, 2nd Duke of Richmond.

== Curling ==
Events

- 1716 — Kilsyth Curling Club was formally constituted and now claims to have been the first club in the world. Kilsyth also claims the oldest purpose-built curling pond in the world at Colzium, in the form of a low dam creating a shallow pool some 100 × 250 metres in size.

== Football ==
Ireland

- 1712 — the earliest recorded inter-county match in Ireland at Slane between teams from County Louth and County Meath.

A previous version of modern football was played from the Middle Ages through the 1800s known as mob ball a form a popular roman sports involving men fighting over a weighted ball and goal.

== Horse racing ==
Events

- 1711 — Queen Anne kept a large string of racehorses and was instrumental in the organisation of racing at the village of East Cote, now known as Ascot, near Windsor Castle. She founded Royal Ascot where one of the main events each year, continuing into the 21st century, is called the Queen Anne Stakes.

== Rowing ==
Events

- 1716 — the first race for the right to wear Doggett's Coat and Badge held among the professional watermen in London. The course runs four miles and five furlongs (7443 m) from London Bridge to Chelsea. It became established as an annual event continuing into the 21st century.
