= 1601 to 1700 in sports =

Sports became increasingly popular in England and Ireland through the 17th century and there are several references to cricket and horse racing, while bare-knuckle boxing was revived. The interest of gamblers in these sports gave rise to professionalism. The first known attempts to organise football took place in Ireland.

== Boxing ==
Events

- 6 January 1681 – The Duke of Albemarle arranges the first recorded boxing match in modern history, fought between his footman and a butcher.

== Chess ==
- Having been firmly established in Spain and Italy during the 15th and 16th centuries, chess becomes increasingly fashionable in France which, by the end of the 17th century, is the main centre of the game in Europe.
- 1681 – Opening of the Café de la Régence in Paris, originally as the Café de la Place du Palais-Royal as it is near the Palais-Royal. It becomes the "Mecca of French chess" in the 18th century.

== Cotswold Games ==
- Robert Dover's Olimpick Games are held in the Cotswolds from c.1604 to 1612.

== Cricket ==
Events

- c.1611 — the world's earliest known organised cricket match is played at Chevening, Kent between teams styled Weald and Upland and Chalkhill.
- 1611 to 1660 — numerous court cases concerning cricket.
- 10 September 1624 — death of Jasper Vinall (born c. 1590), the first cricketer known to die as a result of an injury received when playing the game.
- Village cricket thrives in the middle period of the 17th century, but there is no evidence of teams of county strength being formed at this time.
- c.1660 — in the wake of the English Restoration, the popularity of cricket as a gambling sport encourages investment and patronage; the introduction of professional players and the formation of teams representative of multiple parishes, possibly whole counties, mark the beginning of an evolution from the level of village cricket towards a higher standard of competition.
- 1695 — Parliament decides against a renewal of the 1662 Licensing Act, clearing the way for a free press on the Act's expiry in 1696; it is from this time that matters concerning cricket and other sports may be reported in the newspapers.
- 7 July 1697 — the Foreign Post reports a "A Great Match in Sussex" played for fifty guineas, the earliest known record of a top-class match.

== Curling ==
Events

- 1620 — earliest known use of the word "curling" found in the preface and verses of a poem by Henry Adamson, printed in Perth, Scotland.

== Football ==
Events

- 1602 — Richard Carew describes the game of "hurling to goals" being played in eastern Cornwall in his "Survey of Cornwall". The game has the earliest described rules requiring equal numbers, no playing of the ball on the ground, and banning the forward pass, with similarities to the modern game of American football.

Ireland

- 17th century — football games grow in popularity and are widely played under the patronage of the gentry; games are organised between landlords with each team comprising 20 or more tenants and attracting wagers with purses of up to 100 guineas.
- 1670 — the earliest record of a recognised precursor to modern football dates from a match in County Meath in which catching and kicking the ball are permitted.
- 1695 — "foot-ball" is banned by the severe Sunday Observance Act, imposing a fine of one shilling (a substantial amount at the time) for those caught playing sports on the Sabbath; it proves difficult, if not impossible, for the authorities to enforce the Act.

== Golf ==
Events

- 1603 — James VI of Scotland appoints Edinburgh bowmaker William Mayne as royal club-maker for his lifetime.

== Horse racing ==
Events

- 1605 — Newmarket becomes known as the home of horse racing in England after its discovery by James I while out hawking or riding; the region has a long association with horses since the time of Boadicea and the Iceni.
- 1634 — by this time, spring and autumn race meetings have been introduced at Newmarket and the first Gold Cup event is held in 1634.
- 1654 — all horse racing is banned by the Puritans and many horses are requisitioned by the state.
- 1664 — following the Restoration, racing flourishes and Charles II institutes the Newmarket Town Plate, writing the rules himself:

"Articles ordered by His Majestie to be observed by all persons that put in horses to ride for the Plate, the new round heat at Newmarket set out on the first day of October, 1664, in the 16th year of our Sovereign Lord King Charles II, which Plate is to be rid for yearly, the second Thursday in October for ever".

== Lacrosse ==
Events

- 15th–19th century — Native Americans play lacrosse to resolve conflicts, heal the sick, give thanks to the Creator and train for war in modern-day Canada and the United States.
- 1636 — Jean de Brébeuf, a French Jesuit missionary, watches a Huron game of lacrosse in what is now Ontario; he notices that the sticks resemble a bishop's crosier or "la crosse" in French.

== Sources ==
- Altham, H. S. (1962). A History of Cricket, Volume 1 (to 1914). George Allen & Unwin.
- Buckley, G. B. (1935). Fresh Light on 18th Century Cricket. Cotterell.
- McCann, Tim (2004). Sussex Cricket in the Eighteenth Century. Sussex Record Society.
- Underdown, David (2000). Start of Play. Allen Lane. ISBN 0-7139-9330-8.
- Webber, Roy (1960). The Phoenix History of Cricket. Phoenix.
