= Segesta =

Ancient Sicilian city

- Ἔγεστα (Ancient Greek)
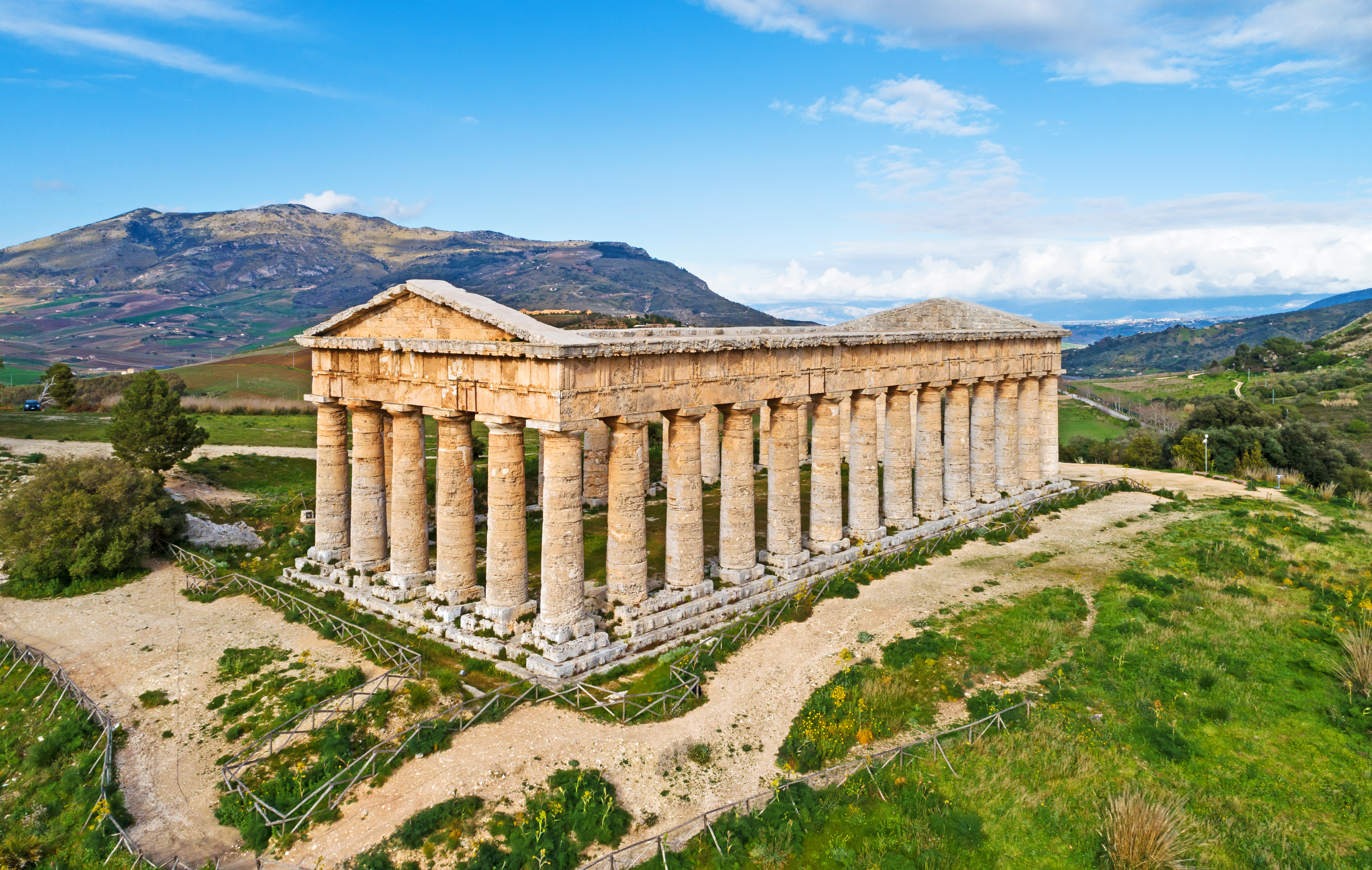
- The Doric temple of Segesta

- Location within Italy
- 37°56′29″N 12°49′56″E
- Type: Settlement
- Cultures: Greek, Elymian
- Location: Calatafimi-Segesta, Province of Trapani, Sicily, Italy

Site notes
- Condition: Preserved
- Owner: Public
- Management: Soprintendenza BB.CC.AA. di Trapani
- Public access: Yes
- Website: Area Archeologica Segesta (in Italian)

Segesta (Ancient Greek: Ἔγεστα, Egesta, or Σέγεστα, Ségesta, or Αἴγεστα, Aígesta; Sicilian: Siggesta) was one of the major cities of the Elymians, one of the three indigenous peoples of Sicily. The other major cities of the Elymians were Eryx and Entella.

Segesta is located in the northwestern part of Sicily in Italy, near the modern commune of Calatafimi-Segesta in the province of Trapani. The hellenization of Segesta happened very early and had a profound effect on its people.

The sixth century geographer Stephanus of Byzantium writes that the city also was called Akeste (Ἀκέστη), named after a certain Akestes (Ἀκέστης). Researchers state that the form Ἀκέστη is an otherwise unattested analogical form to the Latin Acesta. The city is usually called Ἔγεστα or Αἴγεστα.

== History ==
=== Origins ===
The origin and foundation of Segesta are extremely obscure. The tradition current among the Greeks and adopted in the fifth century BC by Thucydides, ascribed its foundation to a band of Trojan settlers, fugitives from the destruction of their city; and this tradition was readily welcomed by the Romans, who in consequence claimed a kindred origin with the Segestans. Thucydides seems to have considered the Elymians (Latin: Elymi), a barbarian tribe in the neighborhood of Eryx and Segesta, as descended from the Trojans in question; but another account represents the Elymi as a distinct people, already existing in this part of Sicily when the Trojans arrived there and founded the two cities. A different story seems also to have been current, according to which Segesta owed its origin to a band of Phocians, who had been among the followers of Philoctetes; and, as usual, later writers sought to reconcile the two accounts.

Another version of the Trojan story related during the first century AD in Virgil's Aeneid, which would seem to have been adopted by the inhabitants themselves, ascribed the foundation of the city jointly by the territorial king Egestus or Aegestus (the Acestes of Virgil), who was said to be the offspring of a Dardanian woman named Segesta and fathered by the river god Crinisus, and by those of Aeneas' folk who wished to remain behind with Acestes to found the city of Acesta. We also are told by another first century geographer, Strabo, that the names of Simois and Scamander were given by the Trojan colonists to two small streams that flowed beneath the town, and the latter name is mentioned by the first century historian, Diodorus Siculus, as one still in use at a much later period.

A disproved belief that the name of the city was originally Acesta or Egesta and changed to Segesta by the Romans to avoid its ill-omened meaning in Latin (egestās means "poverty" or "lack") is corrected by coins that provide evidence that considerably before the time of Thucydides it was called Segesta by the inhabitants and that this name seems to have been softened by the Greeks of Magna Graecia into Egesta.

The city was occupied by a people distinct from the Sicanians, the native population of this part of Sicily, and on the other that it was not a Greek colony. Thucydides, in enumerating the allies of the Athenians at the time of the Peloponnesian War, distinctly calls the Segestans barbarians. At the same time they appear to have been, from a very early period, in close connection with the Greek cities of Sicily, and entering into relations both of hostility and alliance with the Hellenic states, wholly different from the other barbarians in the island. The early influence of Greek civilisation is shown also by their coins, which are inscribed with Greek characters, and bear the unquestionable impress of Greek art.

=== In historical accounts ===
The first historical notice of the Segestans transmitted to us represents them as already engaged (as early as 580 BC) in hostilities with Selinus (modern Selinunte), which would appear to prove that both cities had already extended their territories so far as to come into contact with each other. By the timely assistance of a body of Cnidian and Rhodian emigrants under Pentathlus, the Segestans at this time obtained the advantage over their adversaries. A more obscure statement of Diodorus relates that again in 454 BC, the Segestans were engaged in hostilities with the Lilybaeans for the possession of the territory on the river Mazarus. The name of the Lilybaeans is here certainly erroneous, as no town of that name existed until long afterward; but we know not what people is really meant, although the presumption is that it is the Selinuntines, with whom the Segestans seem to have been engaged in almost perpetual disputes. It was doubtless with a view to strengthen themselves against these neighbors that the Segestans took advantage of the first Athenian expedition to Sicily under Laches (426 BC), and concluded a treaty of alliance with Athens. This, however, seems to have led to no result, and shortly after, hostilities having again broken out, the Selinuntines called in the aid of the Syracusans, with whose assistance they obtained great advantages, and were able to press Segesta closely both by land and sea. In this extremity the Segestans, having in vain applied for assistance to Agrigentum, and even to Carthage, again had recourse to the Athenians, who were, without much difficulty, persuaded to espouse their cause, and send a fleet to Sicily in 416 BC. It is said that this result was in part attained by fraud, the Segestans having deceived the Athenian envoys by a fallacious display of wealth, and led them to conceive a greatly exaggerated notion of their resources. They, however, furnished 60 talents in ready money, and 30 more after the arrival of the Athenian armament.

Although the relief of Segesta was thus the original object of the great Athenian expedition to Sicily (415–413 BC), that city bears little part in the subsequent operations of the war. Nicias, indeed, on arriving in the island, proposed to proceed at once to Selinus, and compel that people to submission by the display of their formidable armament. But this advice was overruled: the Athenians turned their arms against Syracuse, and the contest between Segesta and Selinus was almost forgotten in the more important struggle between those two great powers. In the summer of 415 BC an Athenian fleet, proceeding along the coast, took the small town of Hyccara, on the coast, near Segesta, and made it over to the Segestans. The latter people are again mentioned on more than one occasion as sending auxiliary troops to assist their Athenian allies; but no other notice occurs of them.

The final defeat of the Athenians left the Segestans again exposed to the attacks of their neighbors, the Selinuntines. Feeling unable to cope with them, they again had recourse to the Carthaginians, who determined to espouse their cause, and sent them, in the first instance, an auxiliary force of 5000 Africans and 800 Campanian mercenaries, which sufficed to ensure them a victory over their rivals in 410 BC. This was followed the next year by a vast armament under Hannibal Mago, who landed at Lilybaeum, and, proceeding direct to Selinus, took and destroyed that city as well as Himera. The Carthaginian power now became firmly established in the western portion of Sicily. Segesta, surrounded on all sides by this formidable neighbor, naturally fell gradually into the position of a dependent ally of Carthage. It was one of the few cities that remained faithful to this alliance, even in 397 BC, when the great expedition of Dionysius I of Syracuse to the West of Sicily and the siege of Motya seemed altogether to shake the power of Carthage. Dionysius in consequence laid siege to Segesta, and pressed it with the utmost vigor, especially after the fall of Motya. The city, however, was able to defy his efforts, until the landing of Himilco with a formidable Carthaginian force changed the aspect of affairs, and compelled Dionysius to raise the siege.

From this time there are few mentions of Segesta until the time of Agathocles of Syracuse, under whom it suffered a great calamity. The despot landed in the west of Sicily on his return from Africa (307 BC), and was received into the city as a friend and ally. He suddenly turned upon the inhabitants on a pretence of disaffection, and put the whole of the citizens (said to amount to 10,000 in number) to the sword, plundered their wealth, and sold the women and children into slavery. He then changed the name of the city to Dicaeopolis, and assigned it as a residence to the fugitives and deserters who had gathered around him.

It is probable that Segesta never altogether recovered this blow; but it soon resumed its original name, and again appears in history as an independent city. Thus it is mentioned in 276 BC, as one of the cities that joined Pyrrhus of Epirus during his expedition into the west of Sicily. It, however, soon after fell again under the power of the Carthaginians; and it was probably on this occasion that the city was taken and plundered by them, as alluded to by Cicero; a circumstance of which there are no other account. It continued subject to, or at least dependent on that people, until the First Punic War. In the first year of that war (264 BC) it was attacked by the consul Appius Claudius Caudex, but without success; and shortly after the inhabitants put the Carthaginian garrison to the sword, and declared for the alliance of Rome. They were in consequence besieged by a Carthaginian force, and were at one time reduced to great straits, but were relieved by the arrival of Gaius Duilius, after his naval victory in 260 BC.

Segesta seems to have been one of the first of the Sicilian cities to set the example of defection from Carthage; on which account, as well as of their pretended Trojan descent, the inhabitants were treated with great distinction by the Romans. They were exempted from all public burdens, and even as late as the time of Cicero, continued to be "sine foedere immunes ac liberi" – a free and immune city. After the destruction of Carthage, Scipio Africanus restored to the Segestans a statue of Diana that had been carried off by the Carthaginians, probably when they obtained possession of the city after the departure of Pyrrhus.

During the Second Servile War also, in 102 BC, the territory of Segesta is again mentioned as one of those where the insurrection broke out with the greatest fury. But with the exception of these incidental notices we hear little of it under the Roman government. It seems to have been still a considerable town in the time of Cicero, and had a port or emporium of its own on the bay approximately 10 km distant. This emporium seems to have grown up in the days of Strabo to be a more important place than Segesta, but the continued existence of the ancient city is attested both by Pliny and Ptolemy; and we learn from the former that the inhabitants, although they no longer retained their position of nominal independence, enjoyed the privileges of the Latin citizenship. It seems, however, to have been a decaying place, and no trace of it is subsequently found in history. The site is said to have been finally abandoned, in consequence of the ravages of the Saracens, in 900 AD, and is now wholly desolate. The modern town of Castellammare del Golfo, approximately 10 km distant, occupies nearly, if not precisely, the same site as the ancient emporium or port of Segesta.

== Situation ==
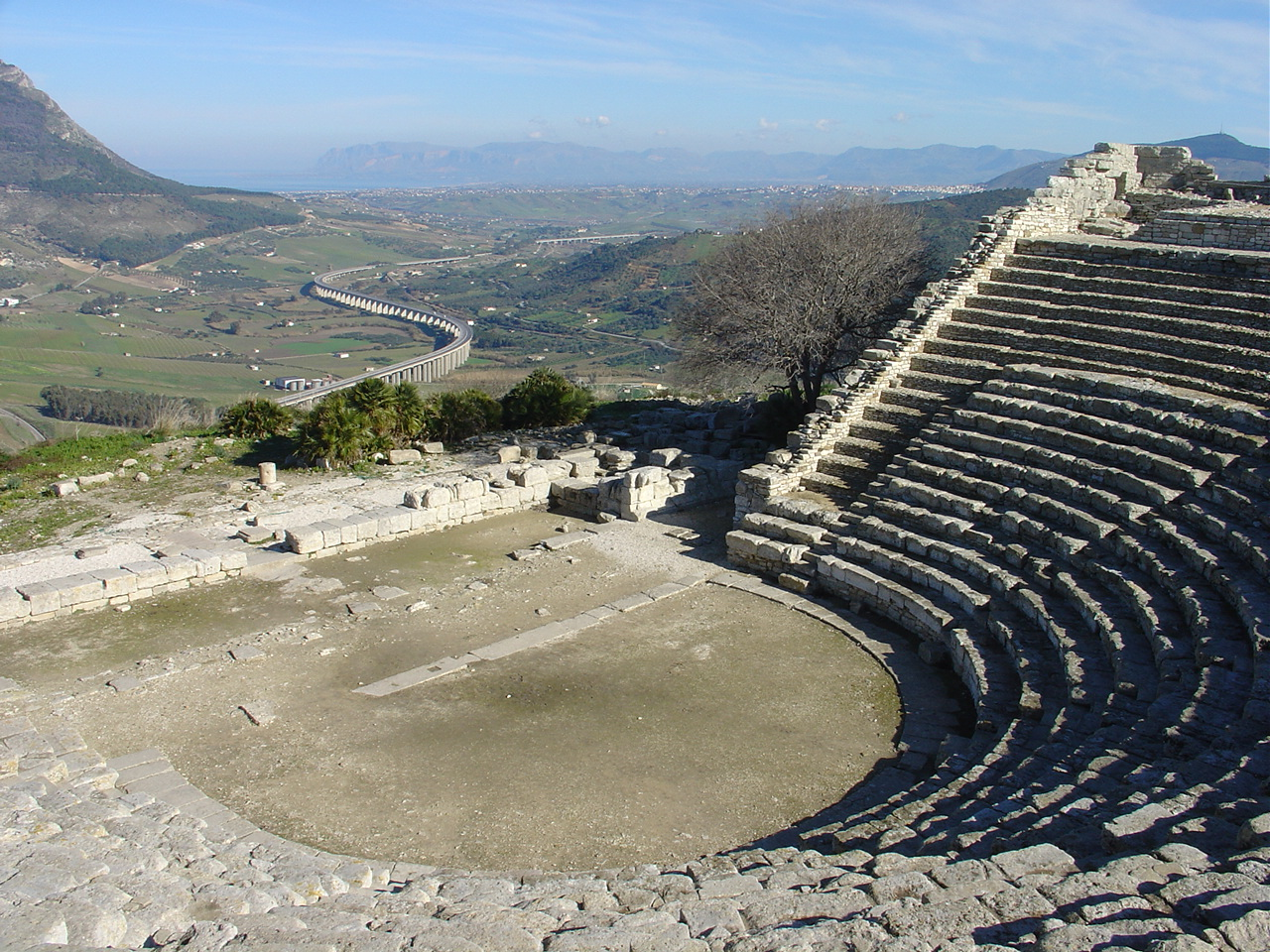
The Greek theater

The ruins of the city are located on the top of Monte Bàrbaro at 305 m above sea level. The city was protected by steep slopes on several sides and by walls on the more gentle slope towards the temple.

The hilltop offers a view over the valley towards the Gulf of Castellamare. The city controlled several major roads between the coast to the north and the hinterland. Very little is known about the city plan. Aerial photography indicates a regular city plan, built in part on terraces to overcome the natural sloping terrain. The current remains might be from the reconstruction after the destruction of the city by Agathocles.

Current archaeological work indicates that the site was reoccupied by a Muslim community in the Norman period. Excavations have unearthed a Muslim necropolis and a mosque from the 12th century next to a Norman castle. Evidence suggests that the mosque was destroyed after the arrival of a new Christian overlord at the beginning of the 13th century. The city appears to have been finally abandoned by the second half of the 13th century.

== The temple ==
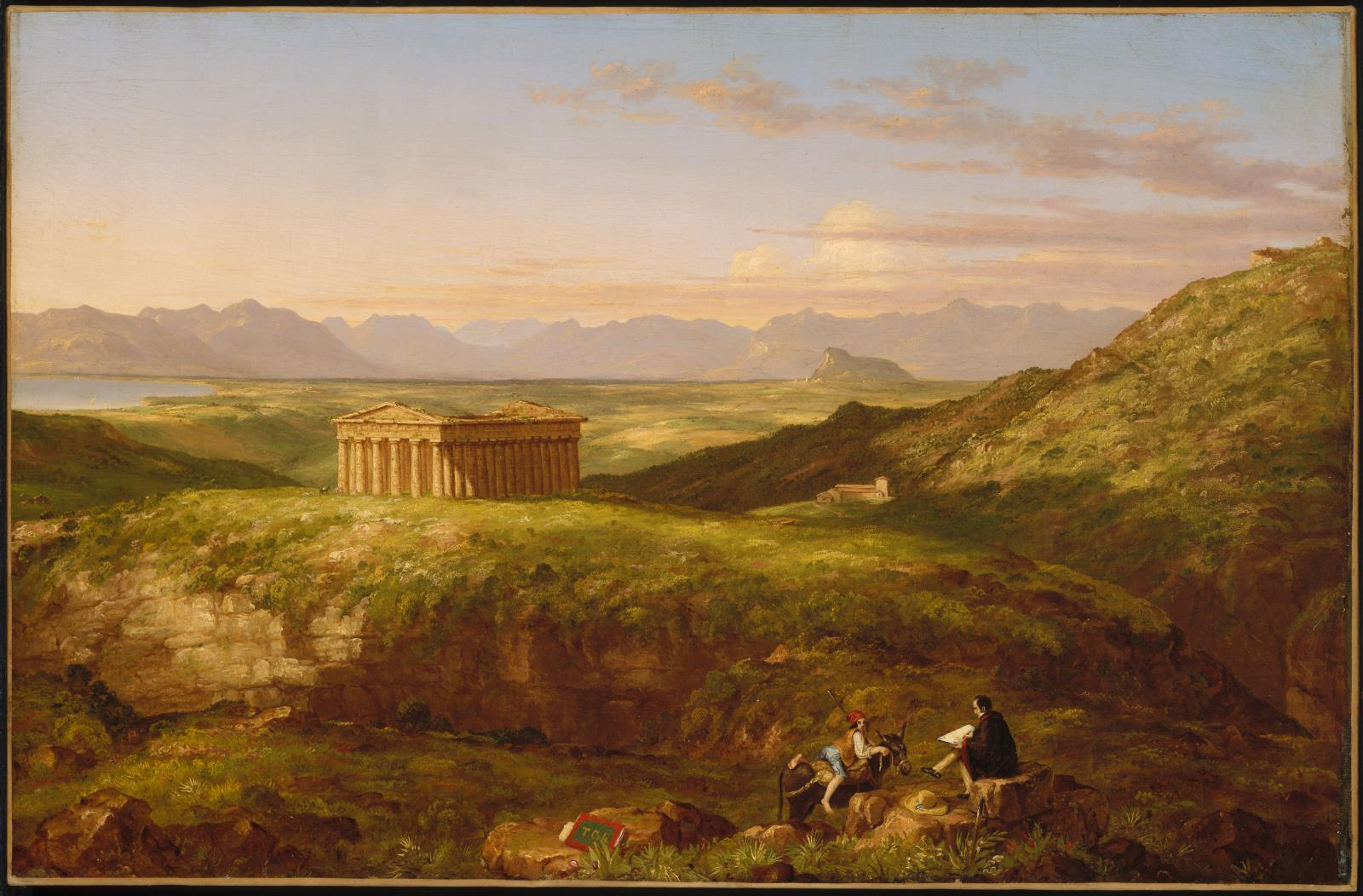
Segesta Temple in Thomas Cole's painting from 1843

On a hill just outside the site of the ancient city of Segesta lies an unusually well-preserved Doric temple. Some think it to have been built in the 420s BC by an Athenian architect, despite the city not having any Greek population. The prevailing view is that it was built by the indigenous Elymians. The temple has six by fourteen columns on a base measuring 21 by 56 metres, on a platform three steps high. Several elements suggest that the temple was never finished. The columns have not been fluted as they normally would have been in a Doric temple, and there are still bosses present in the blocks of the base (used for lifting the blocks into place but then normally removed). The temple also lacks a cella, any ornamentation, altar or deity dedication, and was never roofed over. The temple was never completed due to the war between Segesta and Selinunte. It managed to escape destruction by the Carthaginians in the late 5th century BC.
