= Acestes =

Ancient Roman mythological figure from the Aeneid

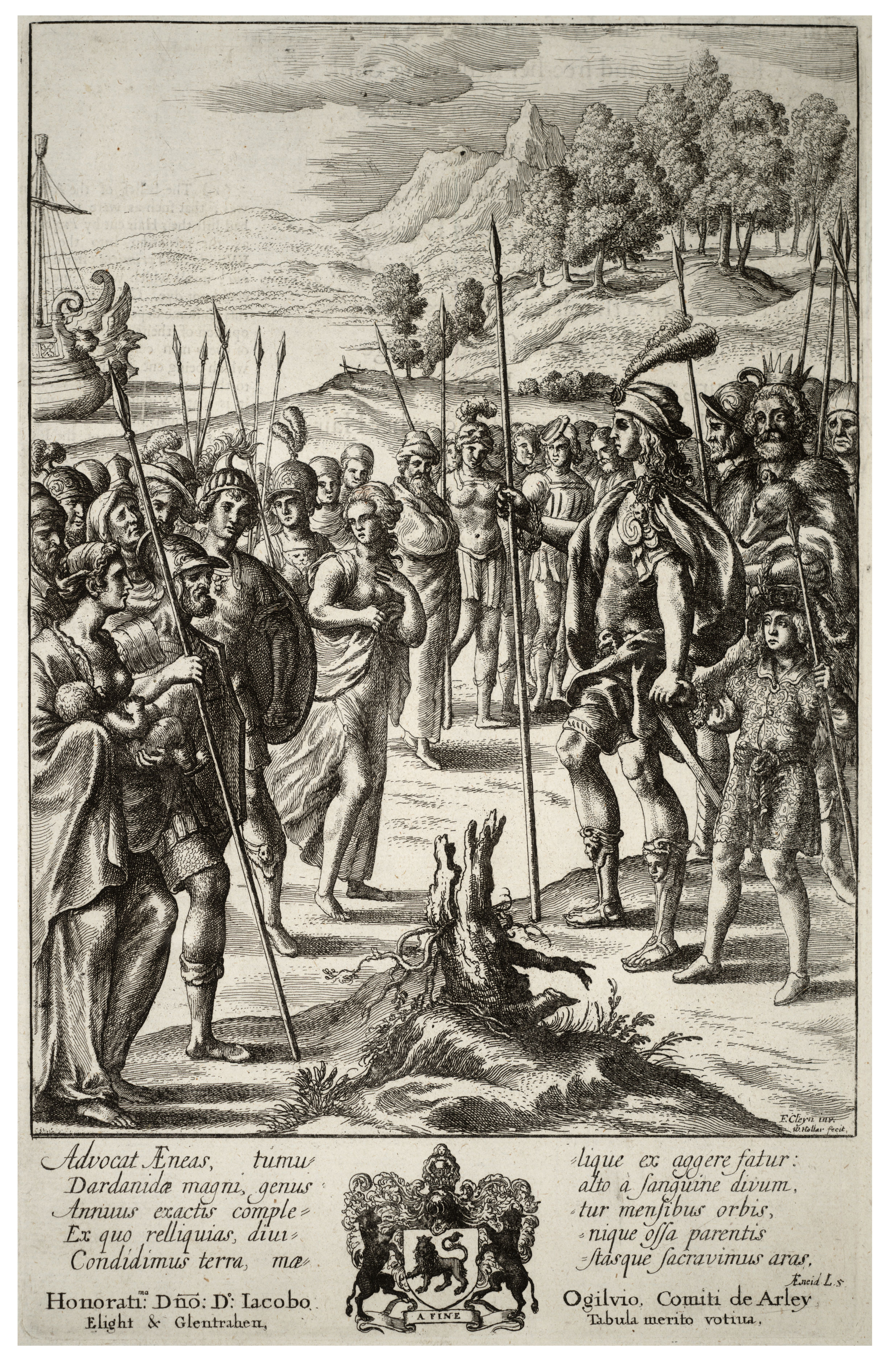
Aeneas and Acestes by Wenceslaus Hollar (1607–1677)

In Roman mythology, Acestes or Egestes (Ancient Greek: Ἀκέστης) was the son of the Sicilian river-god Crinisus by a Dardanian or Trojan woman named Egesta or Segesta.

According to Servius, this woman Egesta or Segesta was sent by her father, Hippotes or Ipsostratus, to Sicily, that she might not be devoured by the monsters which infested the territory of Troy and which had been sent into the land, because the Trojans had refused to reward Poseidon and Apollo for having built the walls of their city. When Egesta arrived in Sicily, the river-god Crinisus in the form of a bear or a dog sired with her a son named Acestes, who was afterwards regarded as the hero who had founded the town of Segesta.

The funeral games of Aeneas's father Anchises were held there. Those of Aeneas's folk who wished to voyage no further were allowed to remain behind with Acestes and together with Acestes's people they founded the city of Acesta, that is Segesta.

The Aeneid cites him as giving wine as a farewell gift to Aeneas as he is leaving Sicily.

== Mythological tradition of Dionysius ==
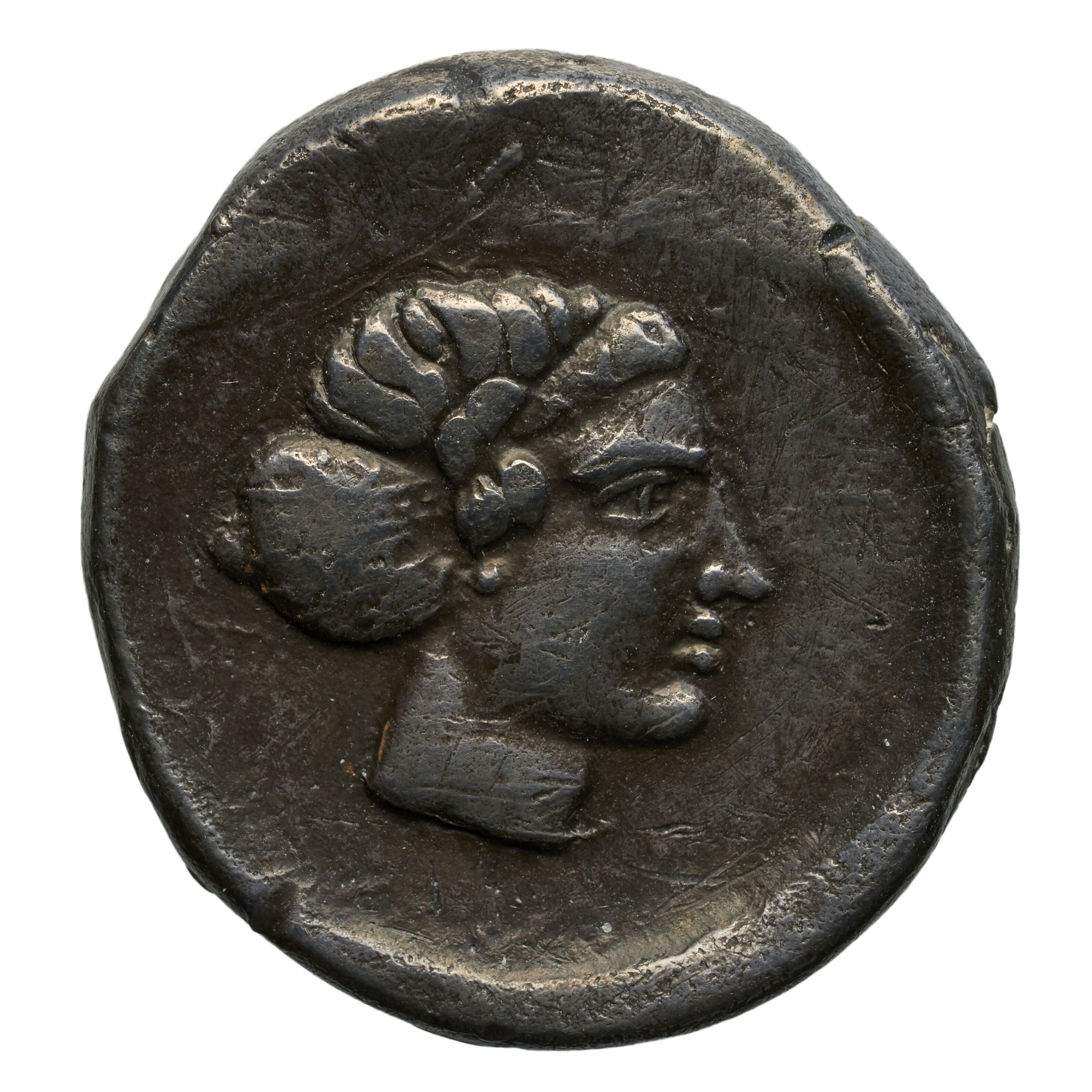
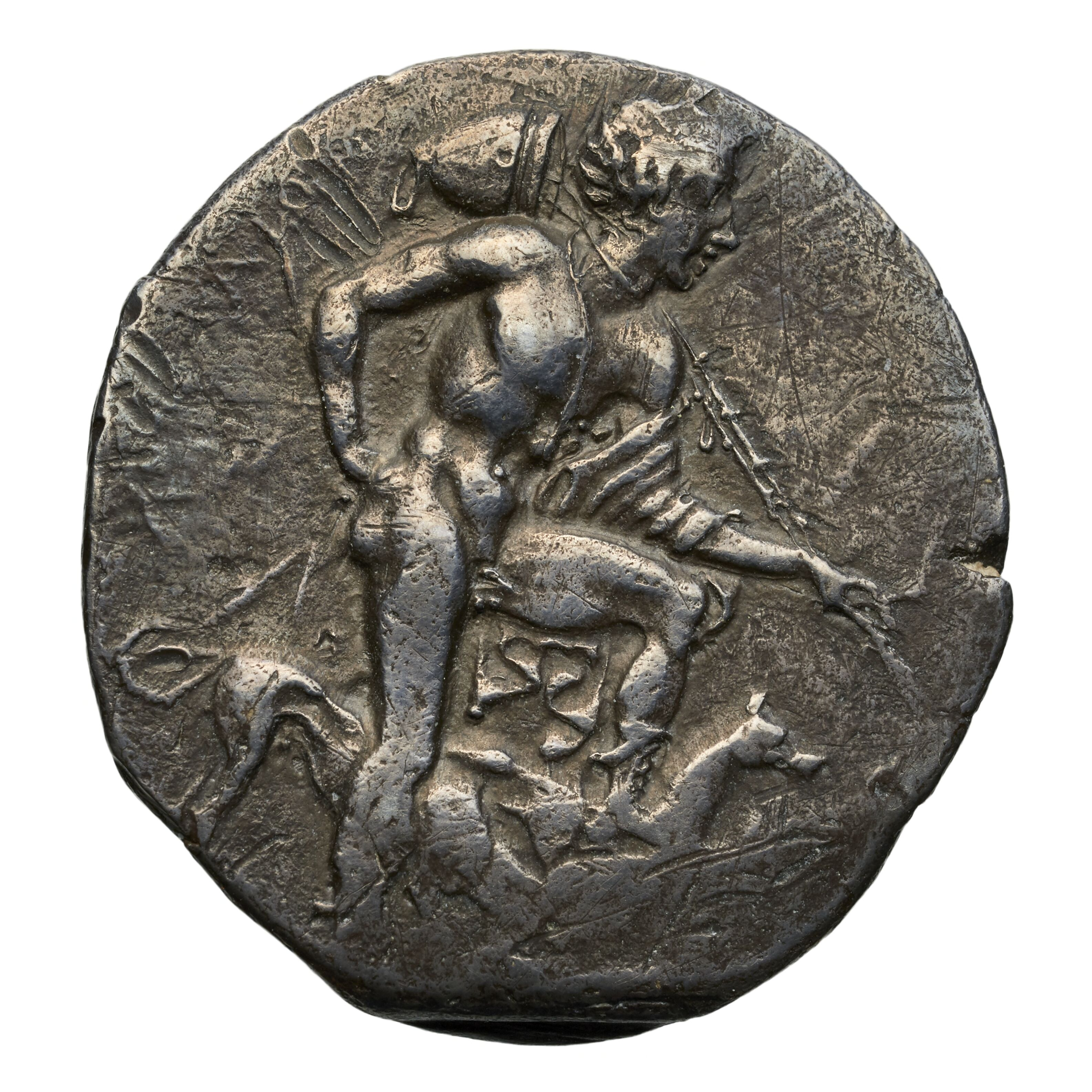
Tetradrachm of Segesta (ca. 400 BCE) depicting the city's namesake nymph on the obverse, with the nude hunter and hounds on the reverse identified as her son Egestes in mythic genealogy, on the basis of inscriptions such as ΕΓΕΣΤΑIΩN (Egestaiōn) found on some examples

The tradition of Acestes in Dionysius of Halicarnassus, who calls him Aegestus (Αἴγεστος), is different, for according to him, the grandfather of Aegestus quarreled with Laomedon, who slew him and gave his daughters to some merchants to convey them to a distant land. A noble Trojan however embarked with them, and married one of them in Sicily, where she subsequently gave birth to a son, Aegestus. During the war against Troy, Aegestus obtained permission from Priam to return and help fight against the Achaeans. When the city was close to falling, he fled back to Sicily with Elymus, taking three ships that Achilles had previously lost during his raiding along the Trojan coast. Aeneas's arrival to Sicily was hospitably received by him and Elymus, and he built for them the towns of Aegesta and Elyme. The account of Dionysius seems to be nothing but a rationalistic interpretation of the genuine legend.

== Arrow of Acestes ==
In the Aeneid, Acestes participates in a trial of skill in which he shoots his arrow which then bursts into flame as a sign from Jupiter of Acestes's deserved honor.
