= Eryx (city) =

Ancient city of Sicily

Coordinates: 38.0375°N 12.5875°E

Eryx (Ancient Greek: Ἔρυξ, Éryx; Punic: 𐤀𐤓𐤊, ʾrk) was an ancient city and a mountain of Magna Graecia in the west of Sicily, about 10 km from Drepana (modern Trapani), and 3 km from the sea-coast. It was located at the site of modern Erice.

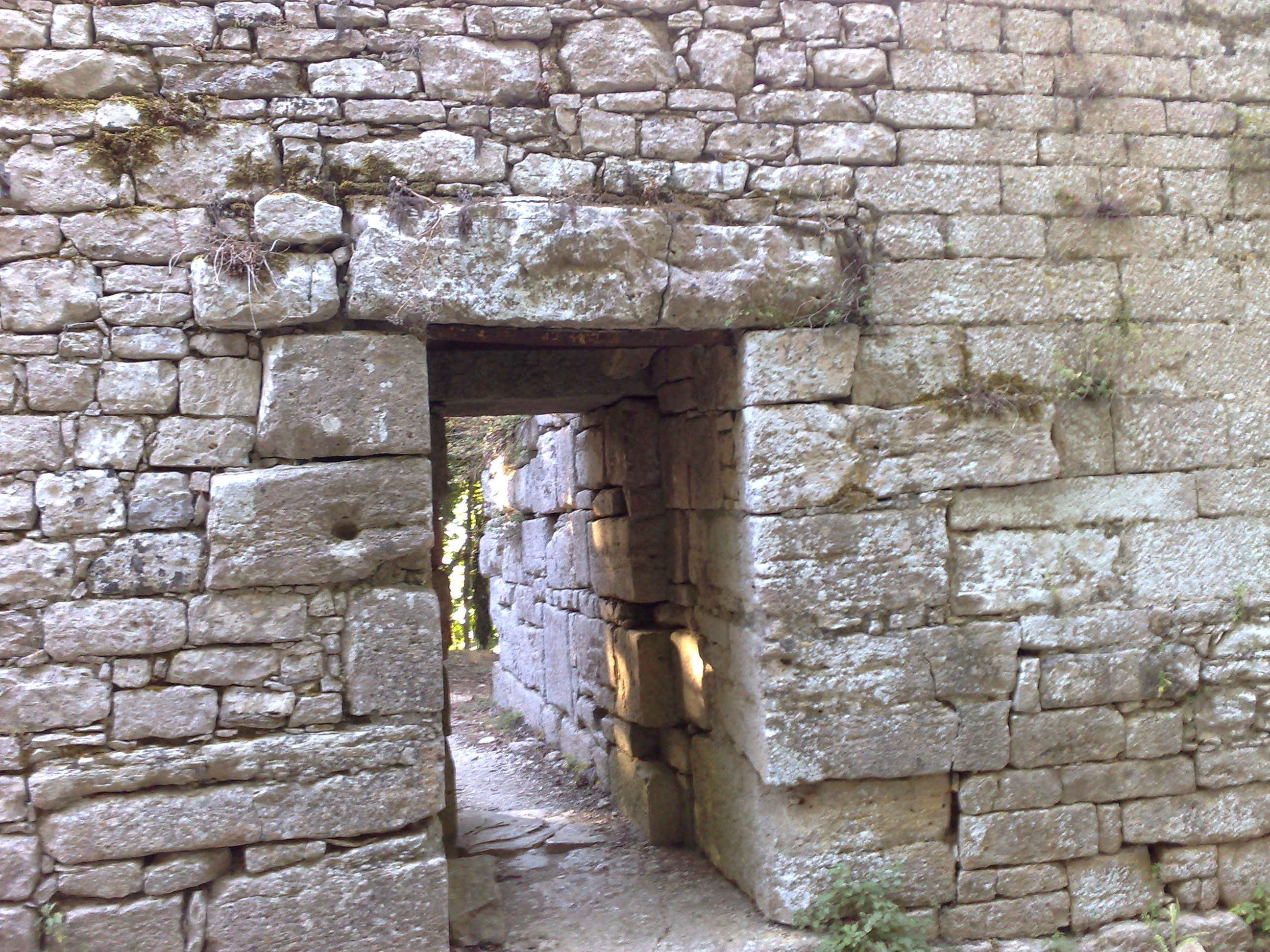
Cyclopean masonry

== Mount Eryx ==
The mountain, now called Monte Erice, is a wholly isolated peak, rising in the midst of a low undulating tract, which causes its elevation to appear much more considerable than it really is, so that it was regarded in ancient as well as modern times as the most lofty summit in the whole island next to Aetna, though its real elevation does not exceed 2184 English feet. Hence we find Eryx alluded to by Virgil and other Latin poets as a mountain of the first order of magnitude, and associated with Athos, Aetna, etc. On its summit stood a celebrated temple of Venus or Aphrodite, founded, according to the current legend, by Aeneas, whence the goddess derived the surname of Venus Erycina, by which she is often mentioned by Latin writers.

== Legends ==
Another legend, followed by Diodorus, ascribed the foundation both of the temple and city to an eponymous hero named Eryx, who was said to have received Hercules on his visit to this part of Sicily, and contended with that hero in a wrestling match, but was vanquished by him. This Eryx was a son of Aphrodite and Butes, a king of the country, and is hence repeatedly alluded to by Virgil as a brother of Aeneas, though that poet does not refer to him the foundation of the city. The legends which connected it with Aeneas and a Trojan chief named Elymus evidently pointed to what we learn from Thucydides as an historical fact, that Eryx as well as Segesta was a city of the Elymi, a Sicilian tribe, which is represented by almost all ancient writers as of Trojan descent.

Yet another version was presented by Apollonius of Rhodes in his epic Argonautica. In this case, Butes was an Argonaut from Athens, who fell overboard in a rapture while listening to the Sirens. He was saved from drowning when Cypris (Aphrodite) took pity on him. She carried him to Eryx, where she ruled, and she settled him at Cape Lilybaeum.

== History ==
=== Native settlement ===
It does not appear to have ever received a Greek colony but became gradually Hellenized, like most other cities of Sicily, to a great extent though Thucydides (460–395) still speaks of the Elymi, including the people of Eryx and Segesta, as barbarians. Nothing is known of its history previous to that period, but it seems probable that it followed for the most part the lead of the more powerful city of Segesta and, after the failure of the Athenian expedition, became a dependent ally of the Carthaginians.

Cyclopean masonry or Phoenician walls, and the parts later modified or built by the Elymians, once hugged the border of Erice.

=== Punic colony ===
In 406 BC, a sea-fight took place between a Carthaginian and a Syracusan fleet off the neighborhood of Eryx, in which the latter was victorious. On occasion of the great expedition of Dionysius I of Syracuse to the west of Sicily in 397 BC, Eryx was one of the cities which joined the Syracusan despot just before the siege of Motya, but it was speedily recovered by Himilco in the following year. It again fell into the hands of Dionysius shortly before his death, but must have been once more recovered by the Carthaginians and probably continued subject to their rule until the expedition of Pyrrhus (278 BC). On that occasion it was occupied by a strong garrison, which, combined with its natural strength of position, enabled it to oppose a vigorous resistance to the king of Epirus. It was, however, taken by assault, Pyrrhus himself leading the attack, and taking the opportunity to display his personal prowess as a worthy descendant of Heracles.

In the First Punic War (264–241 BC) we find Eryx again in the hands of the Carthaginians, and in 260 BC their general Hamilcar destroyed the city, removing the inhabitants to the neighboring promontory of Drepanum, where he founded the town of that name. The old site, however, seems not to have been wholly deserted, for a few years later we are told that the Roman consul L. Junius made himself master by surprise both of the temple and the city. The former seems to have been well fortified, and, from its position on the summit of the mountain, constituted a military post of great strength. Hence probably it was that Hamilcar Barca, suddenly abandoning the singular position he had so long held on the mountain of Ercte, transferred his forces to Eryx, as being a still more impregnable stronghold. But though he surprised and made himself master of the town of Eryx, which was situated about halfway up the mountain, he was unable to reduce the temple and fortress on the summit, the Roman garrison of which was able to defy all his efforts. Meanwhile, Hamilcar maintained his position in the city, the remaining inhabitants of which he transferred to Drepanum; and though besieged or blockaded in his turn by a Roman army at the foot of the mountain, he preserved his communications with the sea, and was only compelled to abandon possession of Eryx and Drepanum when the great naval victory of G. Lutatius Catulus over the Carthaginians forced that people to sue for peace, 241 BC.

=== Later history ===
From this time the town of Eryx sinks into insignificance, and it may even be doubted whether it was ever restored. Cicero (106–43 BC) alludes to the temple, but never notices the town; and Strabo speaks of it as in his day almost uninhabited. Pliny, indeed, enumerates the Erycini among the municipal communities of Sicily; but the circumstance mentioned by Tacitus, that it was the Segestans who applied to Tiberius for the restoration of the temple, would seem to indicate that the sanctuary was at that time dependent, in a municipal sense, on Segesta. No trace of the subsequent existence of the town of Eryx is found; the remaining inhabitants appear to have settled on the summit of the hill, where the modern town of Erice has grown up on the site of the temple. No remains of the ancient city are extant; but it appears to have occupied the site now marked by the convent of Santa Anna, about halfway down the mountain.

== Anagogia and Katagogia ==
Anagogia (ἀναγώγια) was a festival celebrated at Eryx in honour of Aphrodite. The inhabitants of the place believed that, at a certain period of the year, the goddess went over into Africa, and that all the pigeons of the town and its neighbourhood likewise departed to accompany her.

Nine days afterwards, at the so-called katagogia (καταγώγια, meaning return), one pigeon having returned and entered the temple, the rest followed. This was the signal for general rejoicing and feasting. The whole district was said at this time to smell of butter, which the inhabitants believed to be a sign that Aphrodite had returned.

== Temple ==
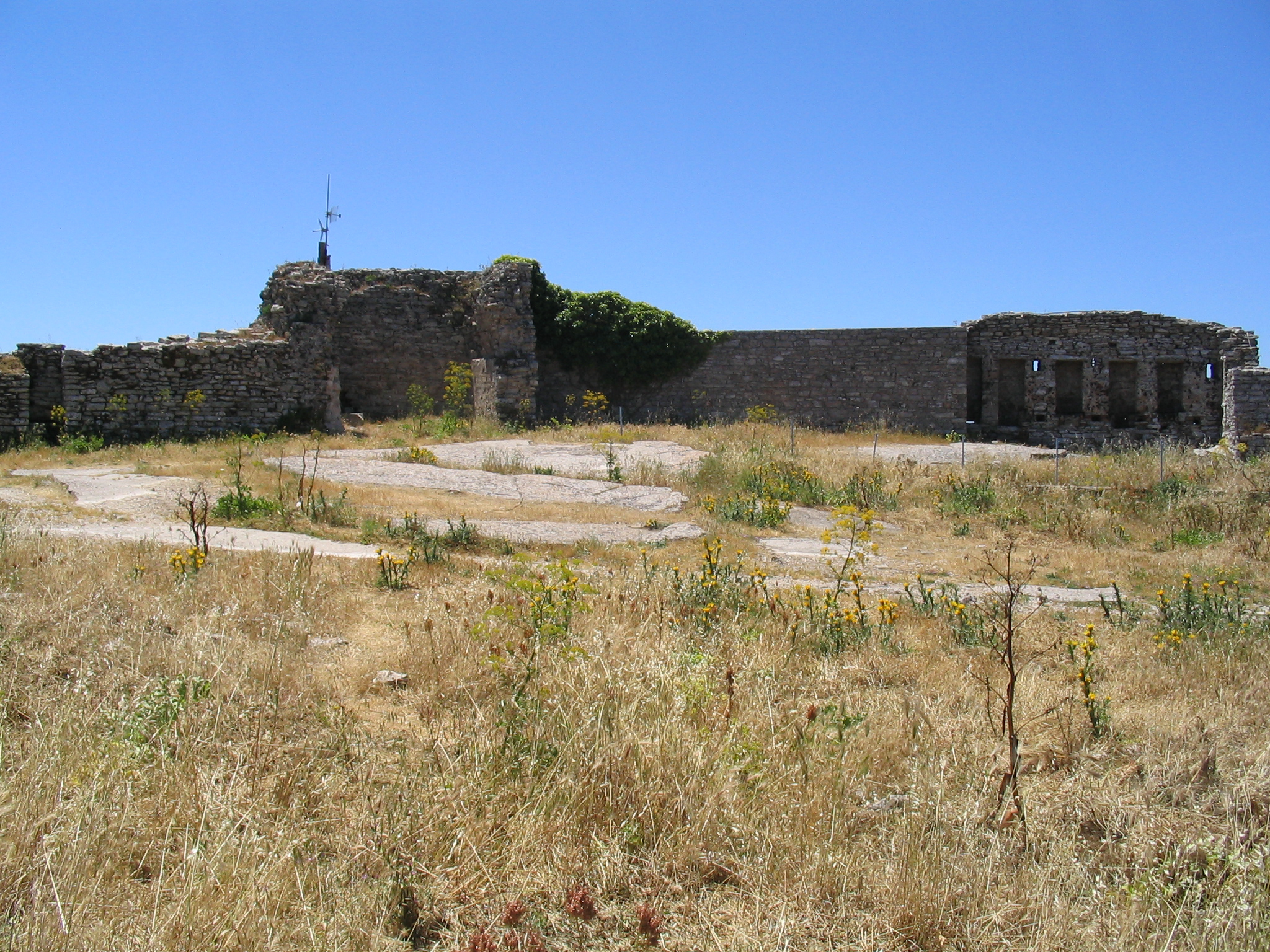
Temple of Venus Erycina

The temple, as already mentioned, was generally connected by popular legend with the Trojan settlements in this part of Sicily; if any value can be attached to these traditions, they would point to its being an ancient seat of Pelasgic worship, rather than of Phoenician origin, as supposed by many writers. Even those authors who represent it as founded before the time of Aeneas relate that it was visited by that hero, who adorned it with splendid offerings. It is certain that the sanctuary had the good fortune to be regarded with equal reverence by the Phoenicians, Carthaginians, Greeks, and Romans. As early as the time of the Athenian expedition to Sicily (415 BC), we learn from Thucydides that it was rich in vessels and other offerings of gold and silver, of which the Segestans made use to delude the Athenian envoys into a belief of their wealth. The Carthaginians appear to have identified the Venus Erycina with the Phoenician goddess Astarte, and hence showed her much reverence; while the Romans paid extraordinary honors both to the goddess and her temple, on account of their supposed connection with Aeneas. They were, indeed, unable to prevent their Gaulish mercenaries from plundering the temple at the time of its capture by Junius; but this appears to have been the only occasion on which it suffered, and its losses were quickly repaired, for Diodorus speaks of it as in a flourishing and wealthy condition. The Roman magistrates appointed to the government of Sicily never failed to pay a visit of honor to this celebrated sanctuary; a body of troops was appointed as a guard of honor to watch over it, and seventeen of the principal cities in Sicily were commanded to pay a yearly sum of gold for its adornment. Notwithstanding this, the decay of the city, and declining condition of this part of Sicily generally, appears to have caused the temple also to be neglected: hence in 25 the Segestans applied to Tiberius for its restoration, which that emperor, according to Tacitus, readily promised to undertake, but did not carry into effect, leaving it to Claudius to execute at a later period. This is the latest mention of it that occurs in history; and the period of its final decay or destruction is unknown.

By the 12th century, the site of the temple was occupied by a castle, converted into a prison; a small portion of the substructions, built of very large and massive stones is all that remains of the ancient edifice; but some fine granite columns, still existing in other parts of the town, have doubtless belonged originally to the temple. It has been already mentioned that the temple itself was surrounded by fortifications, so as to constitute a strong fortress or citadel, quite distinct from the city below: a coin struck by C. Considius Nonianus (in the 1st century BC) represents the temple itself, with this fortified peribolus, enclosing a considerable portion of the mountain on which it stands; but little dependence can be placed on the accuracy of the delineation. There was also a temple at Rome dedicated to Venus Erycina, which stood just outside the Colline Gate; but the representation on the coin just cited is evidently that of the original Sicilian temple. The coins of the city of Eryx have types allusive to the worship of Venus, while others present a close analogy to those of Agrigentum (modern Agrigento), indicating a connection between the two cities, of which we find no explanation in history.
