= Adragna family =

Italian noble house

Adragna Italian: Casa di Adragna
- Sicilian noble family
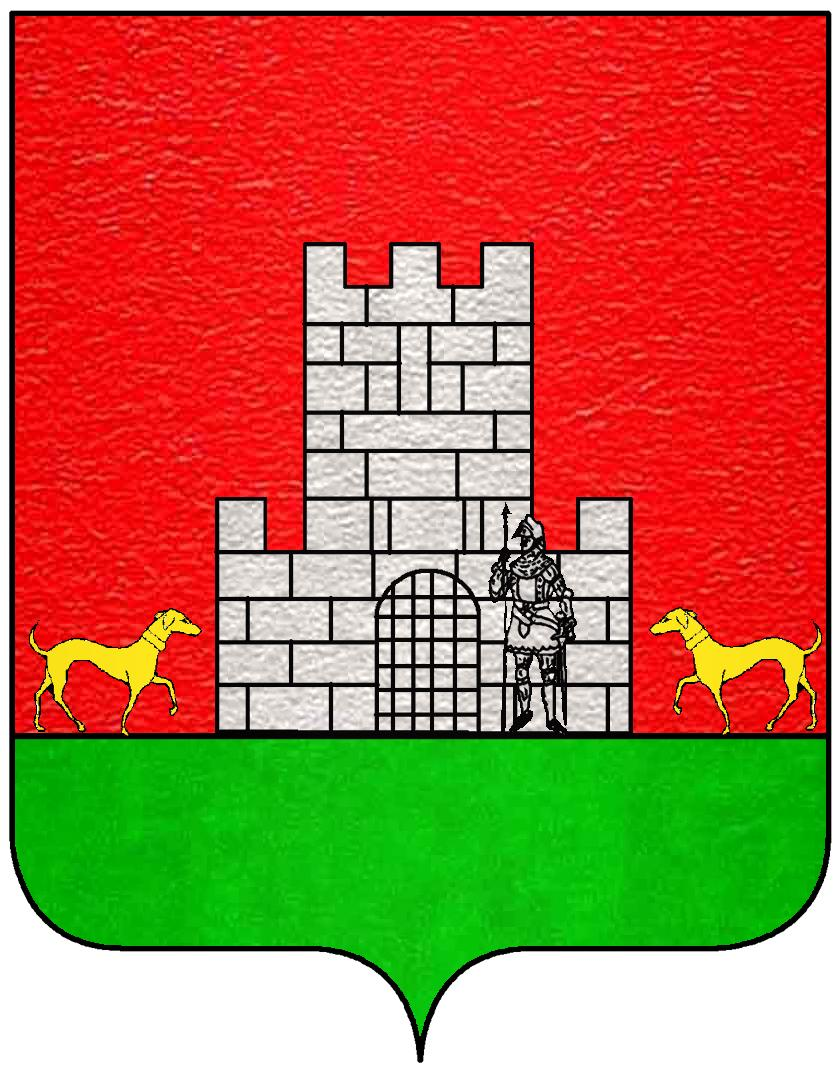
- Motto: "Do not keep silent" (Latin: Non Tacebo)
- Parent house: Pepoli
- Country: Italy; France Former countries: Kingdom of Italy; Kingdom of Sicily; Kingdom of France; Kingdom of the Two Sicilies
- Founded: 1100; 926 years ago
- Current head: Francesco Adragna (it) Gilles Adragna (fr)
- Titles: Baron of Altavilla Salina; Count of Apulia; Duke of d'Adragna; Count of Bourbon-Siciles
- Styles: "Grace"; Vostra Signoria; Don

The Adragna family is an Italian noble house. The family ruled the territory of Altavilla in Sicily, Italy.

== History ==
The family can trace its ancestry to the Norman conquest of Sicily and is descended from the ancient nobility of Bologna. Related to the Pepoli family of Bologna, the family's noble ancestry dates back over 800 years.

The family is found in Salemi, Mazzara, Erice, Monté San Giuliano, Alcamo, and today in Trapani. Nobile Giuseppe Adragna was among the first jurors of Salemi in the years 1567–68; 1573–74. In Mazzara, Pietro Adragna held the rank of captain in charge of Justice on 7 October 1665. In recognition of the family's feudal rights, In 1763 Francesco Adragna invested himself in the Barony of Altavilla Salina, by lease granted to him by Domenico Corvino, Prince of Mezzojuso inherited in his Vault by Baroness Paola Sabia Ventimiglia. Today, the Sicilian Heraldry Commission lists the family in the Golden Book of Italian Nobility, now preserved in the Italian historical archives in Rome. Similarly to other Italian Norman families, the House of Adragna has historic links with the Knights Hospitaller (the present day Order of Malta) through participation in the Crusading movement in the Holy Land.

Gioacchino Napoleone Pepoli, a cousin of the Adragna family, was a senator of the Kingdom of Italy, Mayor of Bologna, and Italian envoy to Russia. Moreover, he was also a grand-nephew of Napoleon Bonaparte through his mother, Princess Louisa Julie Caroline Murat the daughter of Prince Joachim Murat - Napoleon's brother-in-law.

Two younger branches of the family emigrated to France (Adragna d') and the United States (Beccadelli of Bologna) at the end of the 20th century. The title of Duca d'Adragna (Duke of Adragna) became extinct in 1920 after the death of Pietro "Paolo" Beccadelli of Bologna, Senator, Last Prince De Camporeale, 11th Duke of Adragna, without male issue and from marriage of his daughter Anna Maria, Princess of Camporeale with the de La Tour family. The title of Duke of Adragna and a coat of arms resulting from the history of the ancestors Hauteville (Altavilla) / Beccadelli de Bologna / Adragna has been taken over by the French branch in descent from Piétro Adragna (d') to Erice (1665), common ancestor of Baron d'Altavilla and current Count of Puglia. By acquisition, the hereditary eldest of the French branch also recovers the courtesy title of Count of Bourbon-Siciles. The arms of the Duke of Adragna and Count of Bourbon-Sicily are deposited in the armorial of Royal House of France.

== Notable buildings ==
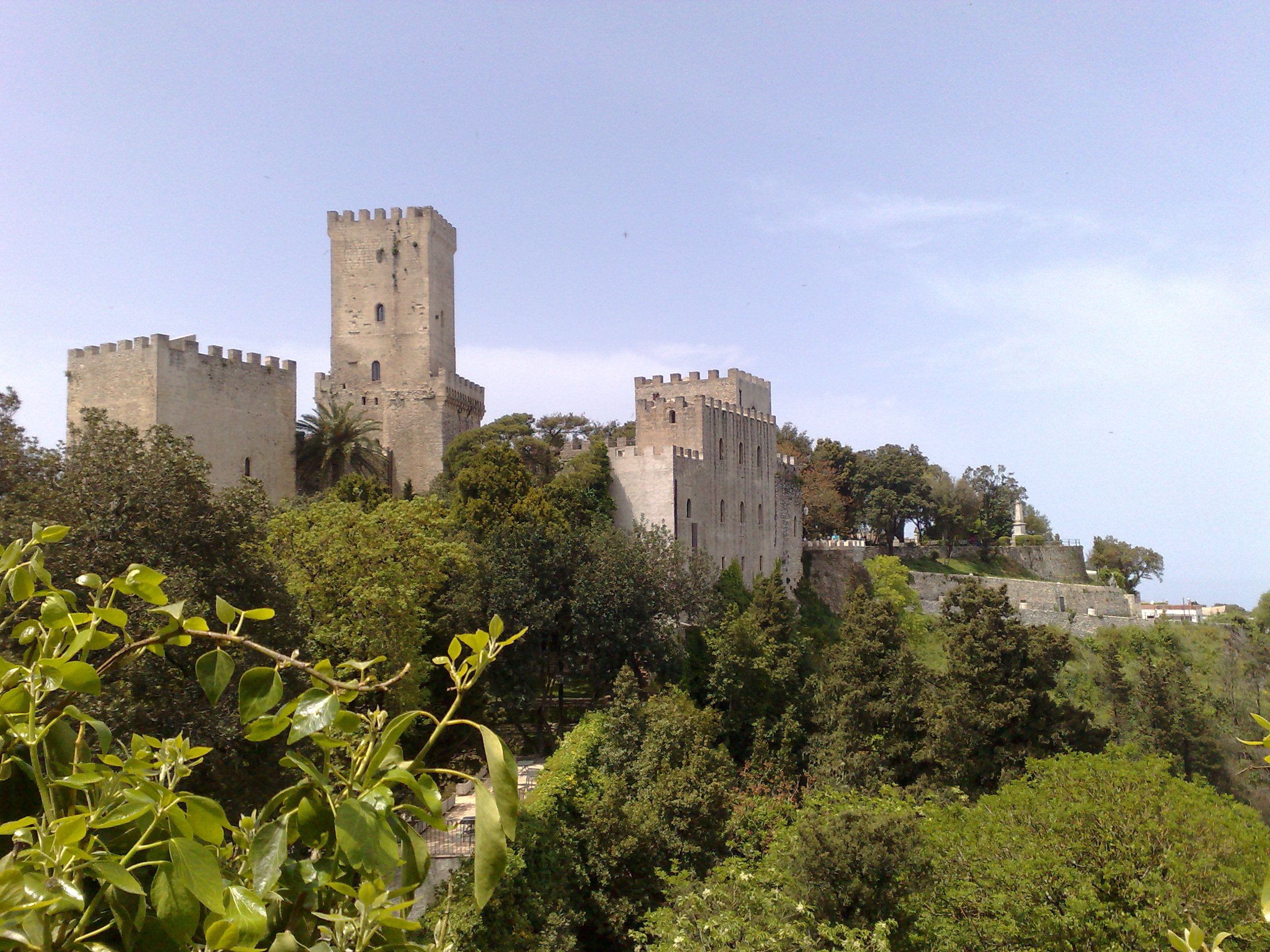
Castello del Balio (Torri Pepoli), part of a complex of castles in Erice

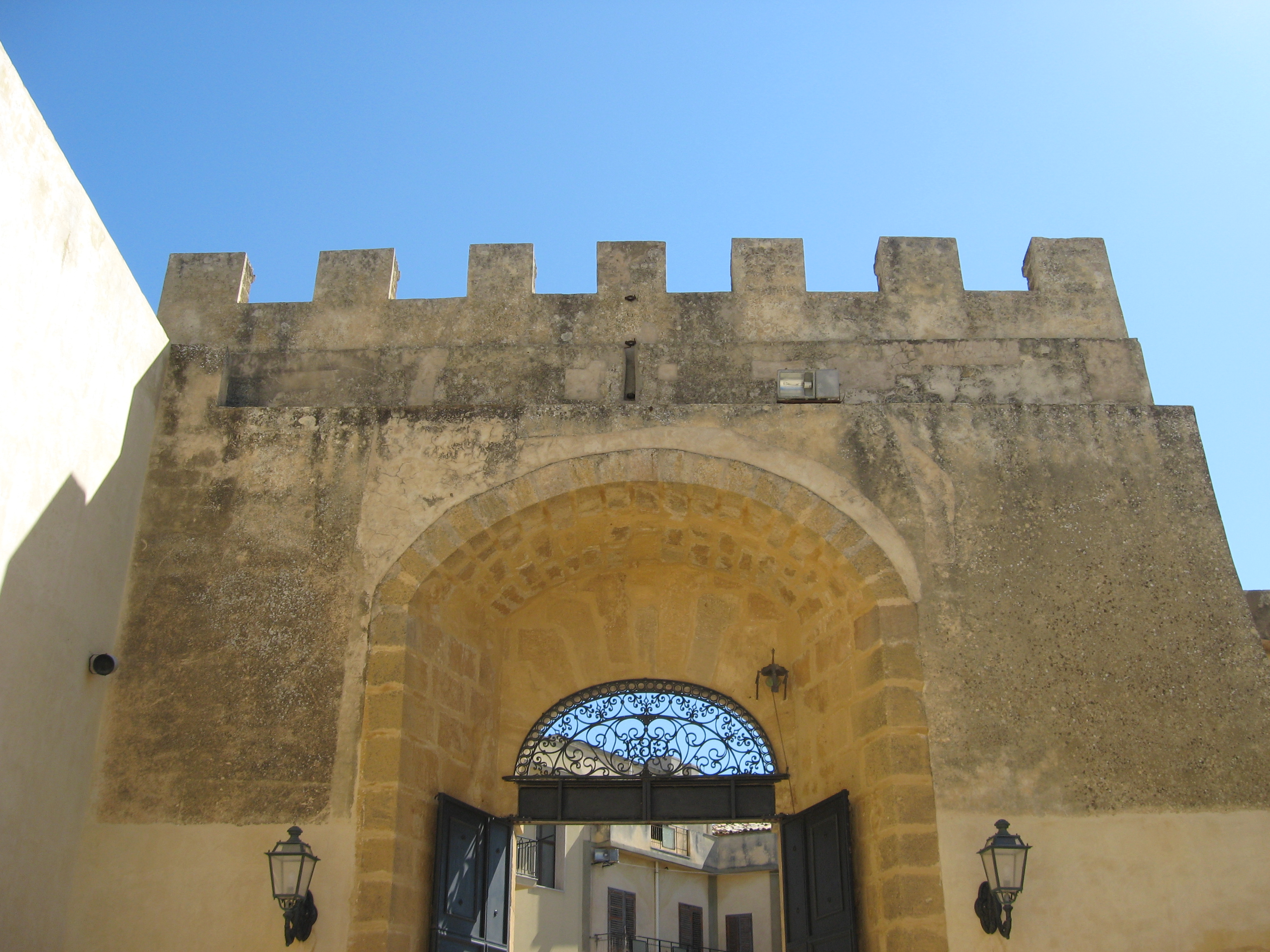
Gate of the Castello Grifeo

Castello Grifeo in Partanna, Trapani, a medieval castle dating from c.1300, was owned by the family from 1890 until the property was donated to the Cultural Heritage Department of Trapani in 1991.

The last King of Italy, Umberto II of Italy visited the Castle in 1941 while Crown prince. Through relation to the Pepoli family, the Norman Castle in Erice, which includes the Torri Pepoli, is partially owned by the Adragna family. In Valderice, the Villa Betania, was built by Baron Girolamo Adragna in the second half of the 19th century.

Notable buildings and structures associated with the family include:

- Villa Adragna, Valderice
- The complex of castles/towers including Venus Castle, Castello del Balio - also known as Torri Pepoli, and the Torretta Pepoli in Erice

== In literature, media and popular culture ==
The character Baron Adragna appears in Vito Bruschini's fictional novel The Prince (published in Italian as The Father – Il Padrino dei Padrini è). The book depicts the rise of the Italian Fascist Party in Sicily, following the story of Ferdinando Licata, a Sicilian nobleman known as the prince. Baron Adragna appears as a conservative nobleman opposed to popular rule.

== Notable members ==
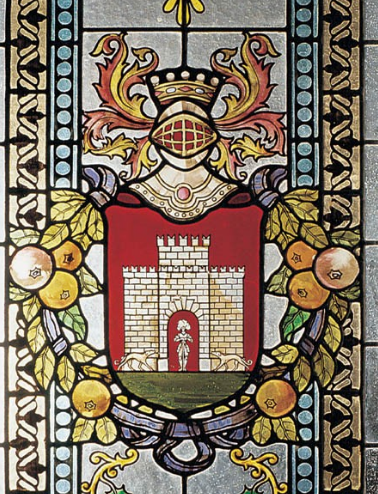
Adragna family coat of arms, Palazzo Adragna

- Chiesa di Santa Maria della Grazia (Alcamo)
- Count Roger of Hauteville, Knight Hospitaller of the First Crusade. birth of the kingdom of sicily and the kingdom of Africa
- Roger II of Hauteville (d' Altavilla), king of Sicily,1130
- Giuseppe Adragna IV, duke of Adragna Juror of Salemi, 1567–68 and 1573–
- Girolamo Beccadelli di Bologne I, duke of Adragna
- Giuliano Adragna, Notary of Trapani c.1486
- Pietro Adragna, nobile, captain of Erice, 1665.
- Francesco Adragna I, Barone della salina di Altavilla1723
- Stefano Adragna, Italian Renaissance patron – commissioned sculptors Bartolomeo Berrettaro and Giuliano Mancino, c.1517, for the Church of Santa Maria della Grazia, Church of the Annunciation (Alcamo) and the Cappella Adragna.
- Giuseppe Beccadelli di Bologna, VI Prince of Camporeale, III Duca d'Adragna
- Antonio Maria Adragna (1818–1890), 104th Minister General of the Order of Friars Minor
- Pietro "Paolo" Beccadelli di Bologna, Senator, Last Prince De Camporeale, 11th Duke of Adragna, 1920.
- Gilles Michel Adragna 12th Duca d'Adragna, Conte di Bourbon-Siciles. (1966-..)
- Benedetto Adragna, member of the Regional Assembly of Sicily,1996
- Francesco Adragna V, Barone della salina di Altavilla 2003.
- Benedetto Adragna, Italian Senator and Quaestor of the Senate (2008–2013)

== See also ==
- Baron of Altavilla Salina
- Italian nobility
- Barone della salina di Altavilla
