= Altavilla (disambiguation) =

Altavilla is a village in the canton of Fribourg, Switzerland.

Altavilla may also refer to:

== Italy ==
- Altavilla Irpina, municipality of the Province of Avellino
- Altavilla Milicia, municipality of the Province of Palermo
- Altavilla Monferrato, municipality of the Province of Alessandria
- Altavilla Silentina, municipality of the Province of Salerno
- Altavilla Vicentina, municipality of the Province of Vicenza

== United States ==
- Alta Villa, Arkansas

== People ==
- Dan Altavilla, American baseball pitcher

== See also ==
- Hauteville family (It.: Casa d'Altavilla), baronial Norman family settled also in Italy
- Hauteville (disambiguation)
