= Giacomo Tranchida =

Italian politician

Mayor of Trapani
- Incumbent
- Assumed office 13 June 2018
- Preceded by: Vito Damiano
- Preceded by: Ignazio Sanges

Mayor of Erice
- In office 29 May 2007 – 12 June 2017
- Succeeded by: Daniela Toscano

Mayor of Valderice
- In office 30 June 1994 – 10 June 2003
- Preceded by: Ferdinando Pioppo
- Succeeded by: Lucia Blunda

Personal details
- Born: 2 February 1963 (age 63) Valderice, Sicily, Italy
- Party: PDS (1991–1998); DS (1998–2007); PD (since 2007)

Giacomo Tranchida (born 2 February 1963 in Valderice) is an Italian politician.

He joined the Democratic Party of the Left in 1991 and was elected mayor of Valderice in 1994 and re-elected for a second term in 1998. As a member of the Democratic Party, he was then mayor of Erice from 2007 to 2017.

Tranchida was elected mayor of Trapani at the 2018 Italian local elections. He took office on 13 June 2018.

== Biography ==
The son of a farming family, Tranchida was born in Valderice in 1963. He has been an employee of Confesercenti since 1992 .

He ran in the October 2017 Sicilian regional elections on the Democratic Party (Italy) ticket but was not elected, receiving 10,578 votes in the Trapani provincial constituency.

In May 2018, he resigned from the Erice City Council and ran for mayor of Trapani, backed by a coalition of seven center-left civic lists in the local elections, where he won in the first round with 70.68% of the vote, defeating the independent candidate Vito Galluffo, who was backed by Forza Italia (2013) and two other civic slates, and took office on June 13.

In May 2023, he ran again for mayor of the provincial capital, backed by nine center-left civic slates and one civic slate from the League, and was re-elected in the first round with 42.5% of the vote.

In 2024, Il Sole 24 Ore annual Governance Poll (a survey that measures the public’s willingness to re-elect incumbent mayors and regional presidents) ranked him last in popularity among the mayors of the 107 provincial capitals; the editors explain how the office of mayor in southern Italy must contend with the financial and administrative challenges of local politics. In 2025, the survey showed a slight improvement: Tranchida no longer ranked as the least popular mayor, though he remained near the bottom of the list.

== See also ==
- 2018 Italian local elections
- List of mayors of Trapani

Political offices
Preceded by Vito Damiano	Mayor of Trapani since 2018	Succeeded by
