= The Fighting at Mount Eryx (First Punic War) =

A prolonged fighting and standoff on Mount Eryx from 244-241 BC

Fighting at Mount Eryx
- Part of First Punic War
Date	244–241 BC
Location	Mount Eryx (modern Erice, Sicily), western Sicily
Result	Carthaginian withdrawal following the Battle of the Aegates Islands

Belligerents
Carthage	Roman Republic

Commanders and leaders
Hamilcar Barca	Various Roman commanders

The Fighting at Mount Eryx was a prolonged military campaign fought from 244 to 241 BC during the First Punic War between Carthage and the Roman Republic. Hamilcar Barca conducted a sustained guerrilla warfare campaign from fortified positions on Mount Eryx during the final years of the war. Polybius describes the fighting around Mount Eryx as a series of small engagements in difficult and rugged terrain, rather than a single pitched battle. He adds that Hamilcar kept the Romans in continual alarm through constant skirmishes and harassment, using the rough and mountainous ground to limit Roman mobility.

== Background ==
After the Battle of Drepanum, the war had reached a stalemate on land in Sicily. In 247 BC, Hamilcar Barca was given command of Carthaginian forces in Sicily. He spent 247 to 244 BC operating from Mount Hercte. In 244 BC, after raiding the Italian coast, Hamilcar marched west and occupied the city of Eryx, a strategic advantage that allowed him to threaten the Roman supply lines.

== Positions on Mount Eryx ==
The standoff at Mount Eryx was unusual in ancient warfare because three different forces simultaneously occupied different parts of the mountain.

- The summit: A Roman garrison occupied the summit of the mountain, including the Temple of Venus. The Romans had captured the summit shortly before Hamilcar occupied Eryx.
- The mid-slope position: Hamilcar Barca and his Carthaginian army occupied the city of Eryx, which was about halfway up the mountain.
- The base: The main Roman army held the base of the mountain and also the terrain leading up to Drepanum.

Hamilcar was positioned between the Roman forces occupying the summit above him and the base below him, yet he maintained his position for several years. He maintained his position through frequent night attacks against the Roman forces.

== Hamilcar's objective ==
Rather than seeking a decisive battle, Hamilcar's strategy at Eryx was to prolong the war and wear down Roman resources. By holding his mid-slope position on the mountain, he forced the Romans to keep a large force there instead of using those troops elsewhere in Sicily. Eryx’s proximity to Drepanum and Lilybaeum also made it strategically important, since the Carthaginian resistance on the mountain helped shield those remaining strongholds from a Roman attack. As long as Hamilcar held his position on Mount Eryx, the Romans were unable to eliminate the remaining Carthaginian resistance in western Sicily, and the campaign remained deadlocked.

== Aftermath ==
Hamilcar's forces were never defeated at Mount Eryx. They only withdrew in 241 BC after Carthage's defeat at the Battle of the Aegates Islands, which cut off the supply route to Eryx. As part of the peace treaty, Hamilcar's troops were allowed to leave Sicily with their weapons and freedom preserved.
