= Baron of Altavilla Salina =

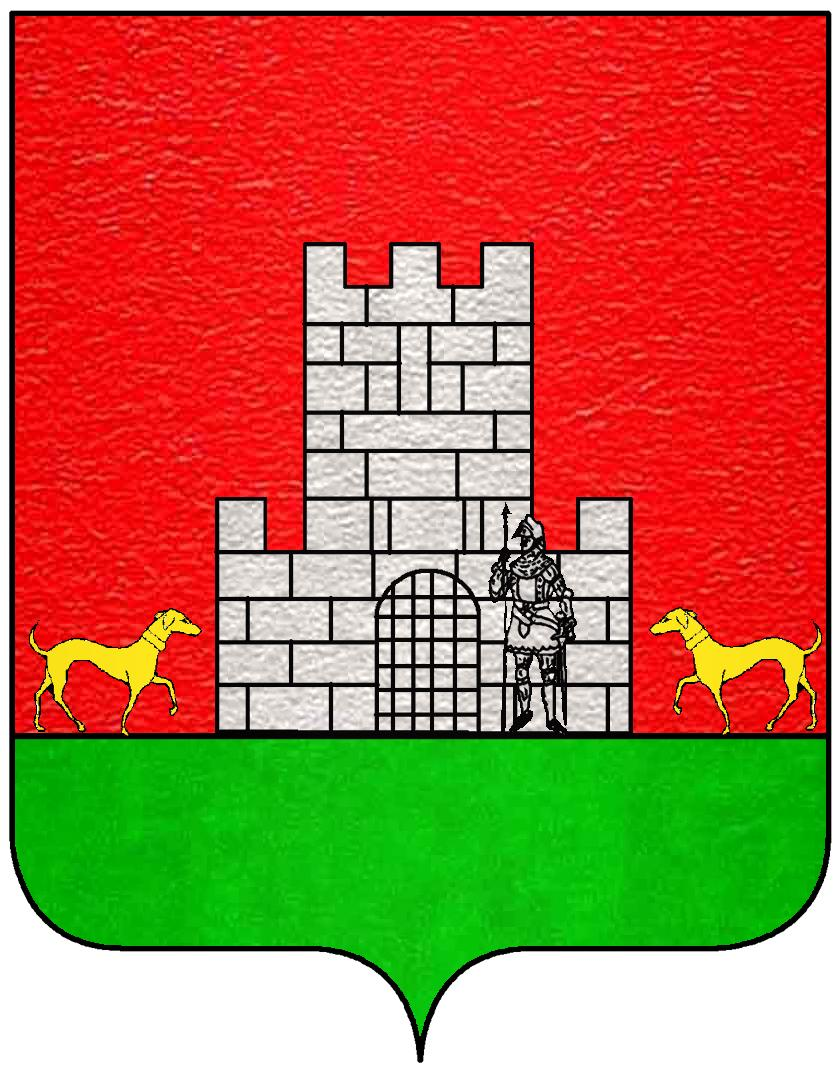
- Red, to the castle battlements and turrets of a piece of silver
- Creation date: 23 April 1763
- Created by: Ferdinand I of the Two Sicilies
- Peerage: Sicilian nobility
- Present holder: Francesco Adragna
- Remainder to: Male line
- Subsidiary titles: All descendants of the male line are titled Nobile dei Baroni della salina di Altavilla
- Motto: Latin: Non Tacebo

Baron of Altavilla Salina (Barone della salina di Altavilla) is a title of Sicilian nobility held by the Adragna family.

== History ==
The family is of Norman ancestry, holding feudal titles and the rank of seigneur since the High Middle Ages, (c. 1150). Francesco Adragna, a Sicilian nobleman and landowner, was granted the title by King Ferdinand I of the Two Sicilies in recognition of the family's feudal rights.

The Adragna family owned the salt lands of Altavilla, one of the islands of the Lagoon of Marsala, having inherited them in perpetuity from the Prince of Mezzojuso in 1763. The family remains engaged in wine production in Trapani and maintains ownership of the Tenute Adragna vineyards and olive groves in the region.

The family is registered with the current title on the list of noble families, and title holders of Sicily. The family name, arms, and title are also transcribed in the Golden Book of Italian Nobility, now preserved in the Italian historical archives in Rome.

== Coat of arms ==
The heraldic blazon for the coat of arms of the family is: Red, to the castle battlements and turrets of a piece of silver, instead of the countryside to the natural, the door guarded by an armed warrior of all silver pieces, placed between two dogs on natural, passing, driving from one side right and the other from the left side of the shield.

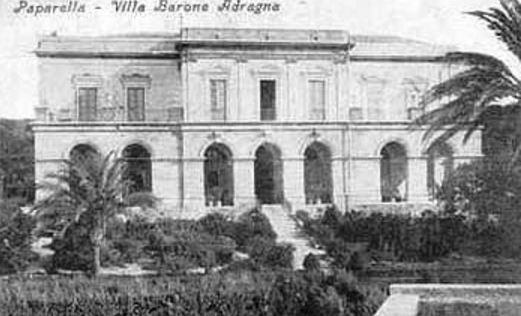
Villa Adragna, Valderice, Trapani

== See also ==
- Adragna family
