= Vito Damiano =

Italian politician

Mayor of Trapani
- In office 24 May 2012 – 3 July 2017
- Preceded by: Girolamo Fazio
- Succeeded by: Giacomo Tranchida

Personal details
- Born: 23 November 1952 (age 73) Trapani, Sicily, Italy
- Party: Centre-right independent
- Profession: carabiniere

Vito Damiano (born 23 November 1952 in Trapani) is an Italian politician.

He was appointed generale di brigata of the Carabinieri in 2007 and served as Mayor of Trapani from 2012 to 2017.

== Biography ==
Born and raised in Trapani, in the Casalicchio (San Pietro) neighborhood, after graduating from the Liceo Classico di Trapani, he won the entrance exam for the Military Academy of Modena in 1971. Subsequently, as a second lieutenant in the Carabinieri, he completed a four-year legal studies program at the Officers’ School in Rome, and later earned a master’s degree in internal and external security sciences.Promoted to colonel in 2000, he served as provincial commander of the Carabinieri in Catania.

A Brigadier General in the Carabinieri since 2007, he serves with the AISE counterintelligence services. In 2009, his name was mentioned in a parliamentary question posed by Francesco Cossiga regarding the Telecom dossier in the investigation involving the intelligence services and Telecom’s head of security, Giuliano Tavaroli. He left active service in November 2011.

As the The People of Freedom candidate in the 2012 municipal elections, he was elected mayor of Trapani in the runoff on May 21, 2012, defeating his rival candidate—also from the center-right—Giuseppe Maurici, who had finished first in the first round with 10,681 votes, by a margin of 12,377 votes.

In October 2015, a motion of no confidence against him was put to a vote; it was rejected with 15 votes in favor (20 were needed) and 11 against (4 abstentions). In December 2015, he filed a lawsuit for aggravated Defamation, alleging that individuals on Facebook had posted offensive comments about him.

In 2017, he announced that, since he was not a politician, he would not be running for re-election in the local elections in June.

== See also ==
- 2012 Italian local elections
- List of mayors of Trapani

Political offices
Preceded by Girolamo Fazio	Mayor of Trapani; 2012–2017	Succeeded by Giacomo Tranchida
