= List of mayors of Trapani =

Mayor of Trapani
- Sindaco di Trapani
- Incumbent; Giacomo Tranchida since 13 June 2018
- Appointer: Popular election
- Term length: 5 years, renewable once
- Formation: 1860
- Website: Official website

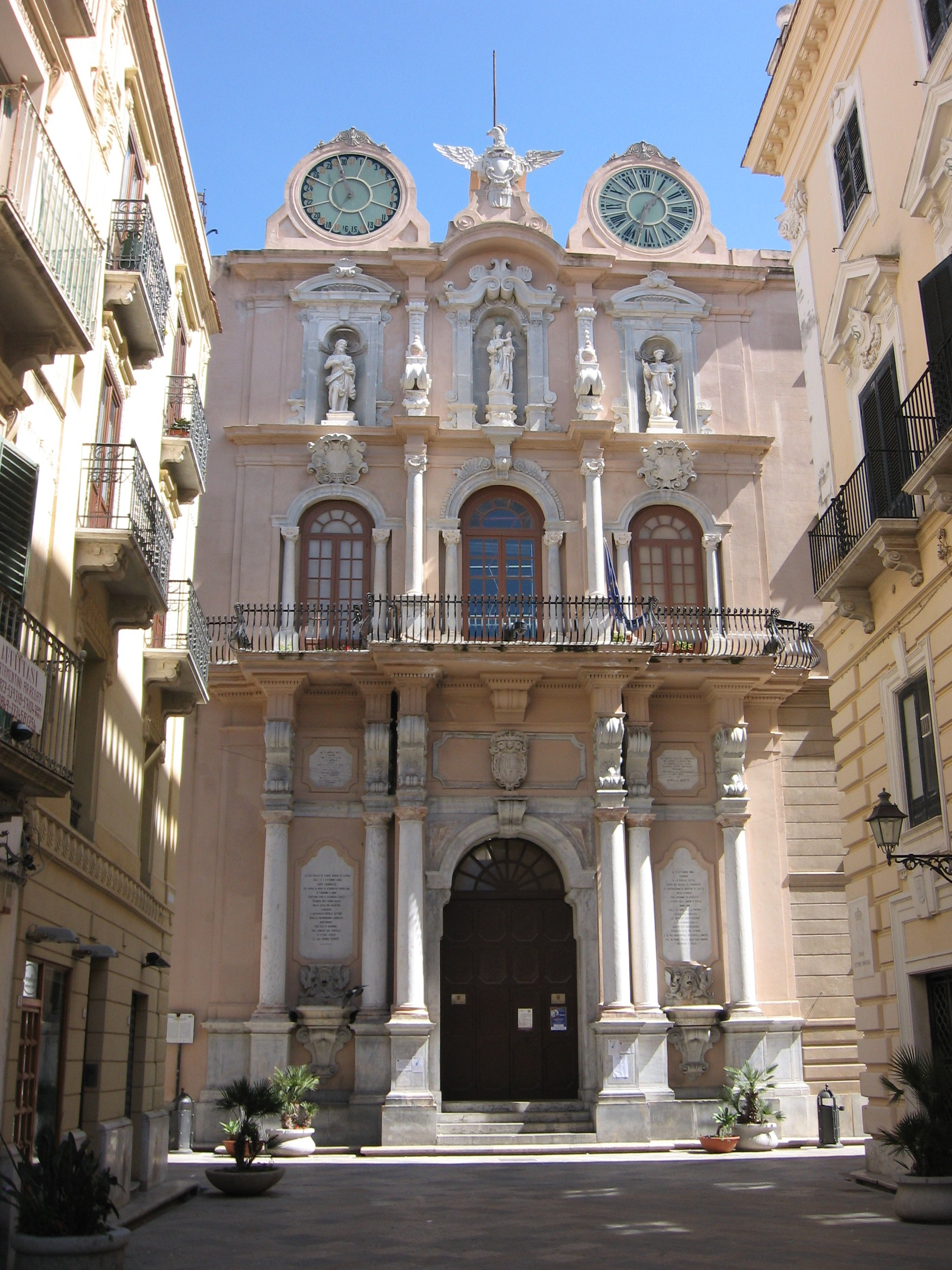
Palazzo Cavarretta is Trapani's City Hall

The mayor of Trapani is an elected politician who, along with the Trapani's city council, is accountable for the strategic government of Trapani in Sicily, Italy.

The current mayor is Giacomo Tranchida, a member of the Democratic Party, who took office on 13 June 2018.

== Overview ==
According to the Italian Constitution, the mayor of Trapani is member of the city council.

The mayor is elected by the population of Trapani, who also elects the members of the city council, controlling the mayor's policy guidelines and is able to enforce his resignation by a motion of no confidence. The mayor is entitled to appoint and release the members of his government.

Since 1994 the mayor is elected directly by Trapani's electorate: in all mayoral elections in Italy in cities with a population higher than 15,000 the voters express a direct choice for the mayor or an indirect choice voting for the party of the candidate's coalition. If no candidate receives at least 50% of votes, the top two candidates go to a second round after two weeks. The election of the City Council is based on a direct choice for the candidate with a preference vote: the candidate with the majority of the preferences is elected. The number of the seats for each party is determined proportionally.

== Italian Republic (since 1946) ==
=== City Council election (1946–1994) ===
From 1946 to 1994, the mayor of Trapani was elected by the City Council.

Mayor		Term start	Term end	Party	Coalition	Election
1	Francesco Manzo	5 May 1946	26 February 1947	PdA	PdA • DC • PSIUP • PCI • PRI	1946
2	Luciano Sesta	26 February 1947	5 September 1947	PDL	DC • PDL	1946
3	Gustavo Ricevuto	5 September 1947	25 May 1949	PDL	DC • PDL • PSIUP • PRI	1946
-	Special Prefectural Commissioner tenure (25 May 1949 – 19 July 1952)					
4	Gaspare Di Maggio	19 July 1952	14 November 1952	Ind	DC • PNM • MSI	1952
(1)	Francesco Manzo	14 November 1952	6 February 1953	PSDI	PSDI • PRI	1952
5	Nicola Agliastro	6 February 1953	5 August 1953	Ind	PNM • MSI • PRI	1952
(2)	Luciano Sesta	5 August 1953	12 March 1955	Ind	DC • PNM • MSI	1952
6	Corrado De Rosa	12 March 1955	27 March 1956	DC	DC • PNM	1952
7	Domenico Laudicina	27 March 1956	5 July 1956	DC	DC • MSI	1952
7	Domenico Laudicina	5 July 1956	12 June 1957	DC	DC	1956
8	Aldo Bassi	12 June 1957	16 December 1957	DC	DC	1956
8	Aldo Bassi	16 December 1957	27 December 1960	DC	DC • MSI • PLI	1956
8	Aldo Bassi	27 December 1960	20 June 1962	DC	DC	1960
8	Aldo Bassi	20 June 1962	13 December 1962	DC	DC • PSI • PSDI • USCS	1960
9	Mario Serraino	13 December 1962	27 June 1963	DC	DC • PSI • PSDI • USCS	1960
10	Francesco Calamia	27 June 1963	1 February 1965	DC	DC • PSI • PSDI • USCS	1960
10	Francesco Calamia	1 February 1965	30 September 1965	DC	DC • PSDI • PRI	1964
11	Antonio Calcara	30 September 1965	31 March 1967	DC	DC • PSDI • PSI	1964
11	Antonio Calcara	31 March 1967	12 April 1968	DC	DC • PSDI • PSI • PRI	1964
12	Saverio Catania	12 April 1968	17 February 1970	DC	DC • PSDI • PSI	1964
13	Vito Renda	17 February 1970	23 July 1970	DC	DC	1964
(12)	Saverio Catania	23 July 1970	29 April 1971	DC	DC • PSDI • PRI	1970
(12)	Saverio Catania	29 April 1971	28 November 1971	DC	DC	1970
(13)	Vito Renda	28 November 1971	22 June 1973	DC	DC • PSI • PRI	1970
(10)	Francesco Calamia	22 June 1973	4 July 1974	DC	DC • PSDI • PSI	1970
14	Natale Tartamella	4 July 1974	10 November 1974	DC	DC • PSDI • PSI	1970
14	Natale Tartamella	10 November 1974	21 July 1975	DC	DC • PSDI • PSI • PRI	1970
15	Cesare Colbertaldo	21 July 1975	29 November 1976	DC	DC • PSDI • PRI	1975
16	Leonardo Grimaudo	29 November 1976	6 December 1977	DC	DC • PSDI • PRI • PSI	1975
17	Lorenzo Vento	6 December 1977	9 March 1978	DC	DC • PSDI • PSI	1975
(14)	Natale Tartamella	9 March 1978	20 October 1978	DC	DC • PSDI • PSI • PRI	1975
(14)	Natale Tartamella	20 October 1978	5 January 1980	DC	DC • PSDI • PRI	1975
(15)	Cesare Colbertaldo	5 January 1980	24 July 1980	DC	DC • PLI • DN	1975
18	Carlo Barbera	24 July 1980	26 September 1981	PSI	DC • PSDI • PSI	1980
19	Vincenzo Occhipinti	26 September 1981	15 May 1982	DC	DC • PSDI • PSI • PRI • PLI	1980
20	Erasmo Garuccio	15 May 1982	13 December 1982	DC	DC • PRI	1980
20	Erasmo Garuccio	13 December 1982	21 July 1985	DC	DC • PRI • PLI	1980
20	Erasmo Garuccio	21 July 1985	8 November 1986	DC	DC • PRI • PSI	1985
21	Vincenzo Augugliaro	8 November 1986	23 June 1990	DC	DC • PRI • PSI	1985
21	Vincenzo Augugliaro	23 June 1990	10 October 1991	DC	DC • PRI • PSI	1990
22	Michele Megale	10 October 1991	25 May 1993	DC	DC • PSI • PLI	1990
23	Mario Buscaino	25 May 1993	10 February 1994	Ind	DC • PSI • PRI	1990
-	Special Prefectural Commissioner tenure (10 February 1994 – 26 June 1994) (Note: Nominated by the Prefect after the Mayor and the members of the City Council resigned in order to hold a new election under the provision of the new local electoral law.)					

=== Direct election (since 1994) ===
Since 1994, under provisions of new local administration law, the mayor of Trapani is chosen by direct election.

	Mayor	Term start	Term end	Party	Coalition	Election
(23)	Mario Buscaino	27 June 1994	7 June 1998	PDS	PDS • LR • AD	1994
24	Antonio Laudicina	7 June 1998	23 April 2001 (Note: Resigned.)	CCD	FI • AN • CCD	1998
–	Alfonso Giordano	Special Prefectural Commissioner tenure (23 April 2001 – 24 November 2001)				
25	Girolamo Fazio	24 November 2001	12 May 2007	FI; PdL	FI • AN • CCD	2001
25	Girolamo Fazio	12 May 2007	24 May 2012	FI; PdL	FI • AN • UDC • MpA	2007
26	Vito Damiano	24 May 2012	3 July 2017	PdL	PdL	2012
–	Francesco Messineo	Special Prefectural Commissioner tenure (3 July 2017 – 13 June 2018)				
27	Giacomo Tranchida	13 June 2018	31 May 2023	PD	PD	2018
27	Giacomo Tranchida	31 May 2023	Incumbent	PD	PD	2023

== Sources ==
- Megale, Michele (2007). Sindaci – Podestà – Commissari (1861–1946). Trapani: C.S. Giulio Pastore.
- Megale, Michele (2008). Cinquant'anni di vita amministrativa a Trapani (1943–1993). Trapani: C.S. Giulio Pastore.
