= Monte Erice =

Mountain in Italy

- Mount Eryx
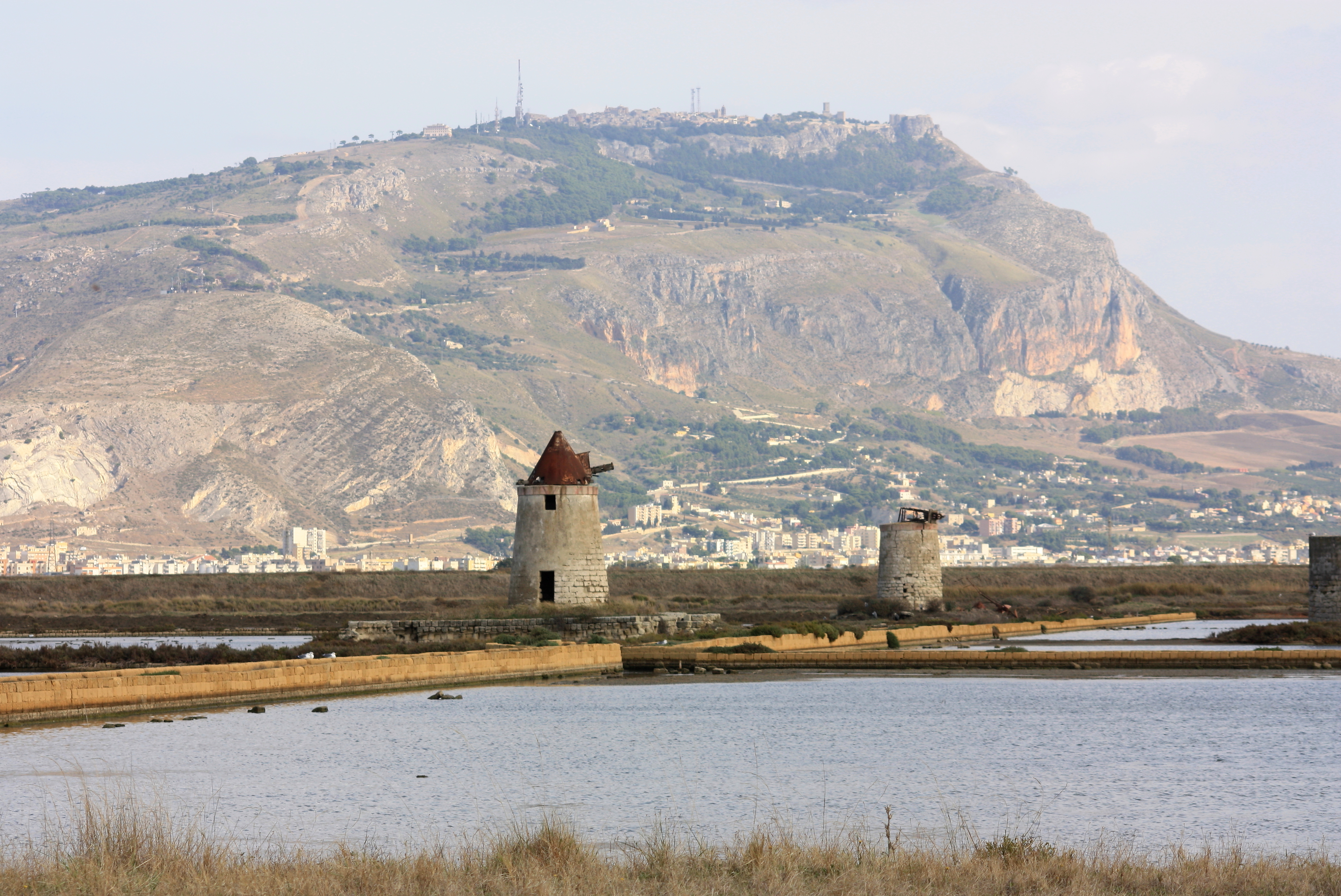
- Monte Erice seen from Trapani

Highest point
- Elevation: 840 m (2,760 ft)
- Coordinates: 38°02′07″N 12°35′32″E

Geography
- Location within Italy Location within Sicily
- Location: Trapani, Sicily, Italy

Monte Erice, or ancient Greek Mount Eryx, is a mountain of Sicily, in the province of Trapani.

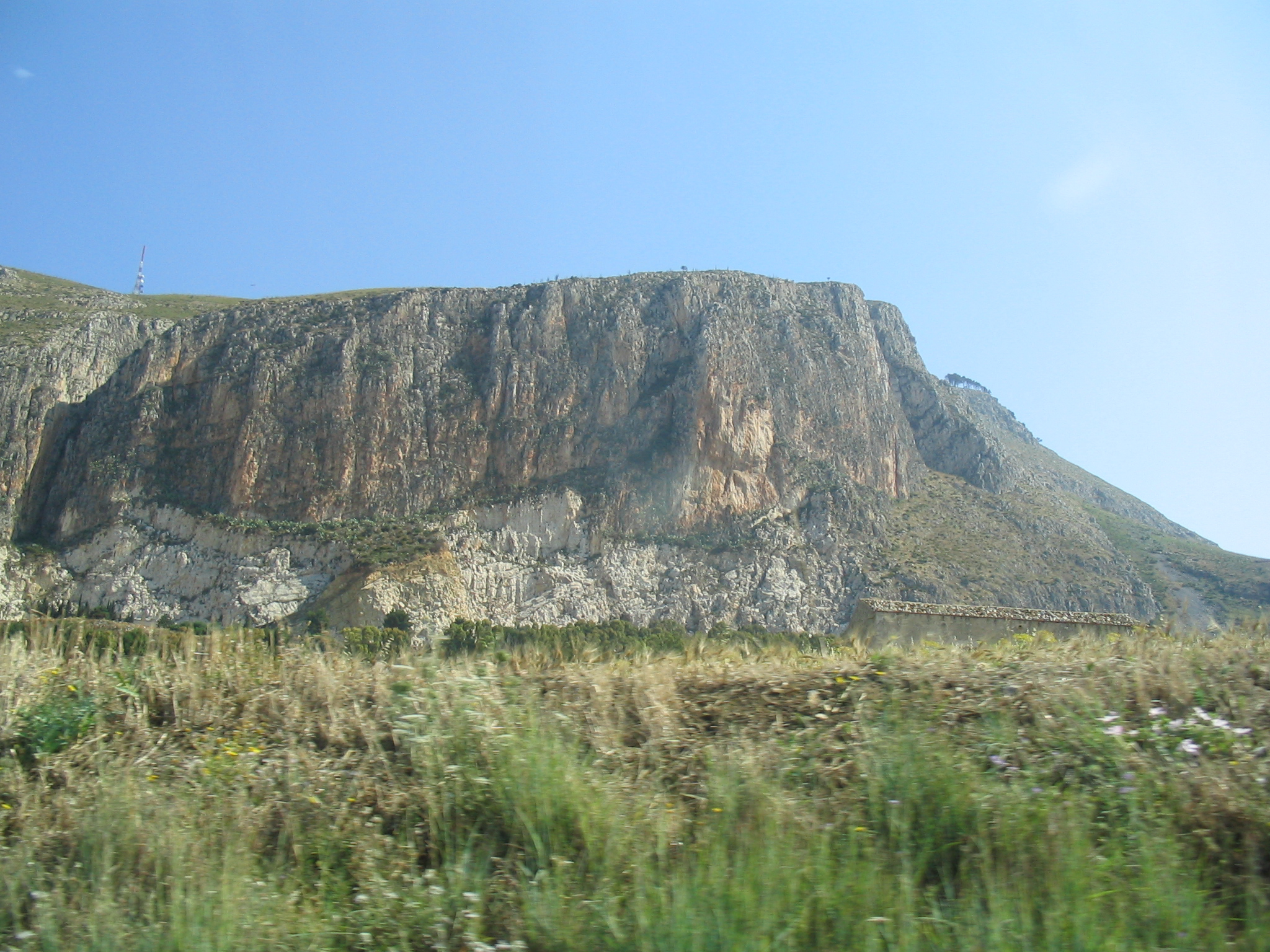
The southern part of the mountain

== Location ==
The mountain is to the east of Trapani and encompasses an area of 18.3 km^{2}. The Lenzi River has its source on the mountain.

The city of Erice is located on the summit, the frazione of Santa Casa, Erice and the suburbs of Trapani are located on the western slopes, and the comune of Valderice is on the eastern side of the mountain.

== Geography ==
The mountain is covered by vegetation: there is a forest of Aleppo pine around Martogna, oak in the state forest of Sant'Anna, as well as holm oak and downy oak in the Costa Spada area.

There are numerous hiking trails. The Sicilian Forestry Corps has established an agro-forestry museum at S. Matteo, 4 km from the summit of Erice.

== History ==
In ancient times the mountain was occupied by the Elymians and subsequently by the Carthaginians, the Greeks, and the Romans, who worshipped Aphrodite Erycina, or Venus Erycina, there. In 1117 it was renamed as Monte San Giuliano by the Normans, . The original name was restored in 1934. Until the 1950s the comune of Monte San Giuliano included the territory of the current commune of Erice, as well as Valderice, Custonaci, San Vito Lo Capo and Buseto Palizzolo.

Since 1954, the Monte Erice hillclimbing championship has taken place on its slopes every year.

== See also ==
- Erice
- Eryx (Sicily)
