= Hauteville =

Hauteville may refer to:

== Places in France ==
- Hauteville, a former commune in the Ain département, part of Hauteville-Lompnes
- Hauteville, Aisne, in the Aisne département
- Hauteville, Ardennes, in the Ardennes département
- Hauteville, Marne, in the Marne département
- Hauteville, Pas-de-Calais, in the Pas-de-Calais département
- Hauteville, Savoie, in the Savoie département
- Hauteville-la-Guichard, in the Manche département
- Hauteville-lès-Dijon, in the Côte-d'Or département
- Hauteville-Lompnes, in the Ain département
- Hauteville-sur-Fier, in the Haute-Savoie département
- Hauteville-sur-Mer, in the Manche département

== Other ==
- Hauteville, Switzerland, a municipality in the Canton of Fribourg, Switzerland
- Hauteville family, a baronial family of Normandy

== See also ==
- Hautteville-Bocage, in the Manche département
- Altavilla (disambiguation)
