= Altavilla Milicia =

- Comune
- Comune di Altavilla Milicia
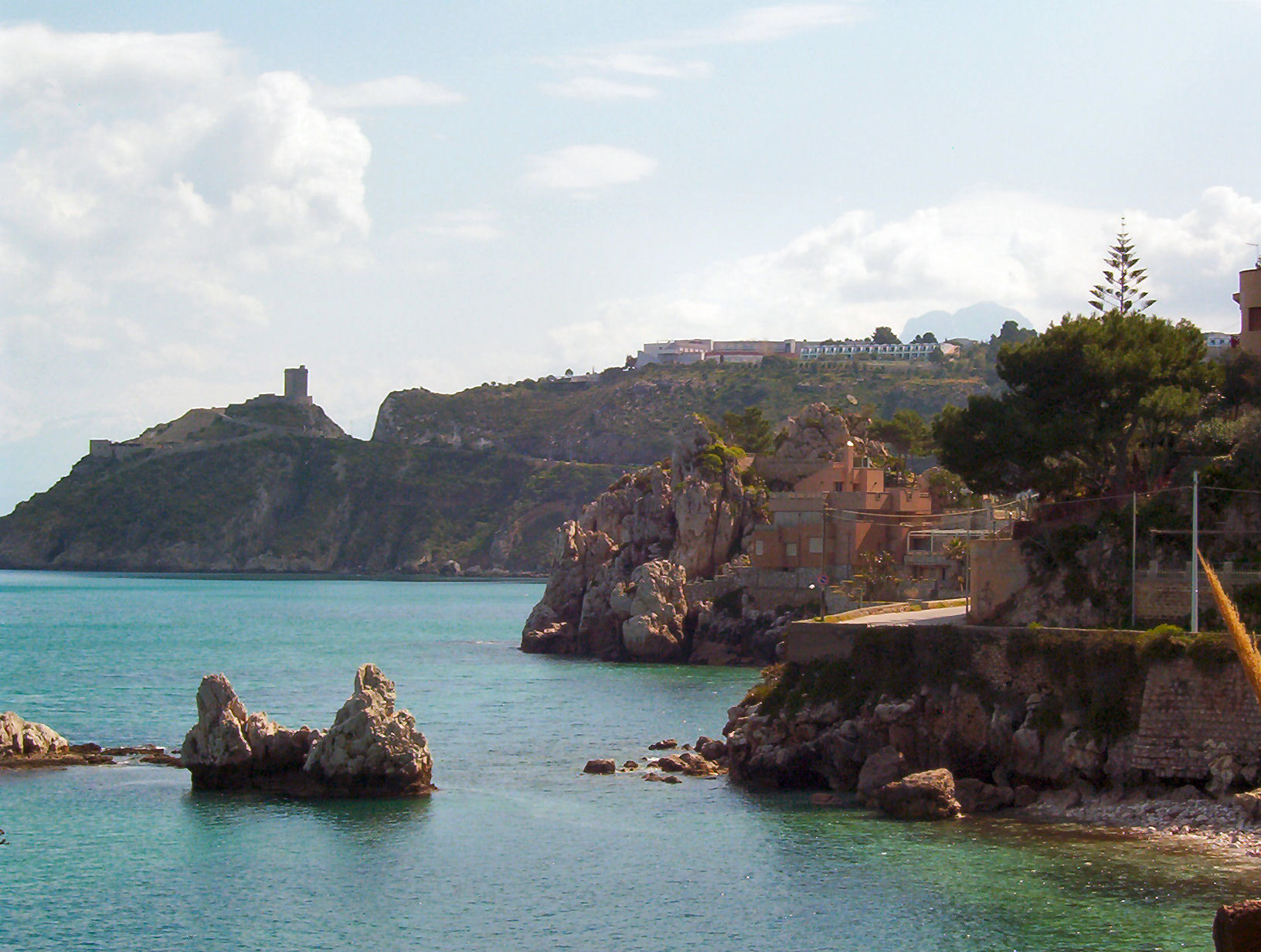
- The coast of Altavilla Milicia

- Location within Italy Location within Sicily
- Coordinates: 38°3′N 13°33′E
- Country: Italy
- Region: Sicily
- Metropolitan city: Palermo (PA)
- Frazioni: Torre Colonna

Government
  - Mayor: Giuseppe Virga

Area
  - Total: 23 km^{2} (8.9 sq mi)
- Elevation: 73 m (240 ft)

Population (30 November 2017)
  - Total: 8,452
  - Density: 370/km^{2} (950/sq mi)
- Demonym: Altavillesi
- Time zone: UTC+1 (CET)
  - Summer (DST): UTC+2 (CEST)
- Postal code: 90010
- Dialing code: 091
- Patron saint: Madonna della Milicia
- Saint day: September 6, 7 and 8
- Website: www.comune.altavillamilicia.pa.it

Altavilla Milicia is a comune (municipality) in the Metropolitan City of Palermo in the Italian region Sicily, located about 20 kilometres (12 mi) southeast of Palermo.

The Commune is named after the Hauteville family, Norman Settlers who conquered Sicily in the 11th century and later became the ruling dynasty of the island. The name Altavilla is an Italian translation of the French Hauteville. The feudal Barony and the Duchy of Altavilla later passed into the hands of the Adragna family.

One of the sights is the Sanctuary of the "Madonna della Milicia".

Altavilla Milicia borders the municipalities of Casteldaccia and Trabia.
