= Mazzara =

Mazzara is an Italian surname. Notable people with the surname include:

- Alessandro Mazzara (born 2004), Italian skateboarder
- Glen Mazzara (born 1967), American television producer and writer
- Maïa Mazzara (born 2003), French figure skater
- Sebastiano Mazzara (born 1975), Italian long-distance runner

== See also ==
- Mazara del Vallo, city in Sicily
