= Erice =

Erice Èryx (Greek)
- Comune
- Città di Erice
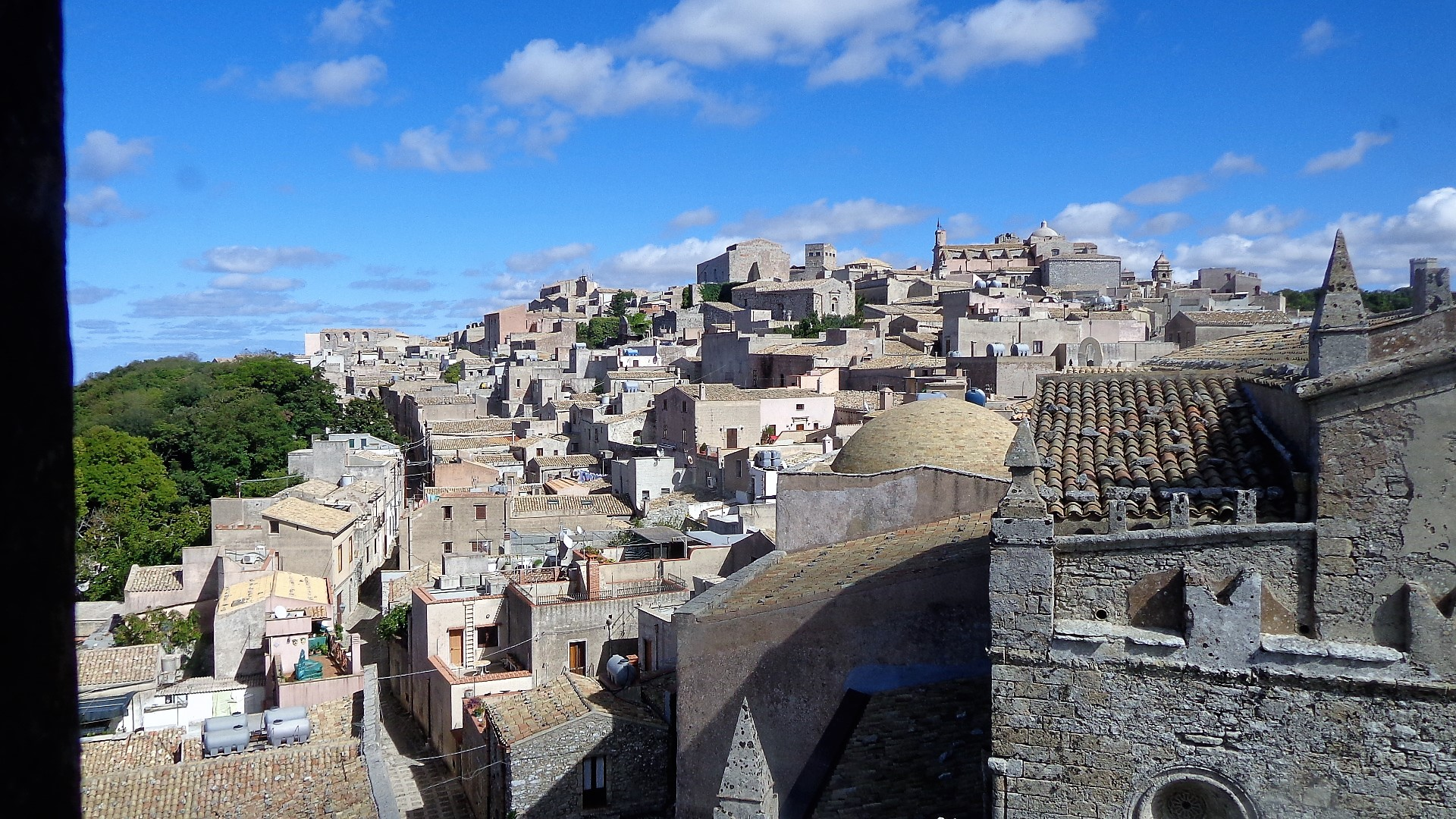
- View of Erice

- Location within Italy Location within Sicily
- Coordinates: 38°2′13″N 12°35′11″E
- Country: Italy
- Region: Sicily
- Province: Trapani (TP)
- Frazioni: Ballata, Casa Santa, Crocefissello, Napola, Pizzolungo, Rigaletta, San Cusumano, Torretta

Government
  - Mayor: Daniela Toscano

Area
  - Total: 47 km^{2} (18 sq mi)
- Elevation: 751 m (2,464 ft)

Population (31 March 2020)
  - Total: 27,464
  - Density: 580/km^{2} (1,500/sq mi)
- Demonym: Ericini
- Time zone: UTC+1 (CET)
  - Summer (DST): UTC+2 (CEST)
- Postal code: 91016
- Dialing code: 0923
- Patron saint: SS. Mary of Custonaci
- Website: Official website

Erice (Italian pronunciation: [ˈɛːɾitʃe]; Sicilian: Èrici [ˈɛːɾɪʃɪ]) is a historic town and comune in the province of Trapani, Sicily, southern Italy. It is a member of the I Borghi più belli d'Italia ("The most beautiful villages of Italy") association.

== Geography ==
The main town of Erice is located on top of Mount Erice, at around 750 metres (2,460 ft) above sea level, overlooking the city of Trapani, the low western coast towards Marsala, the dramatic Punta del Saraceno and Capo San Vito to the north-east, and the Aegadian Islands on Sicily's north-western coast. Casa Santa forms part of Erice at the base of Mount Erice, immediately adjacent to Trapani. A cable car joins the upper and lower parts of Erice.

The bordering municipalities are Buseto Palizzolo, Paceco, Trapani, Valderice and Custonaci. The hamlets (frazioni) are Ballata, Casa Santa, Crocefissello, Napola, Pizzolungo, Rigaletta, San Cusumano and Torretta.

== History ==
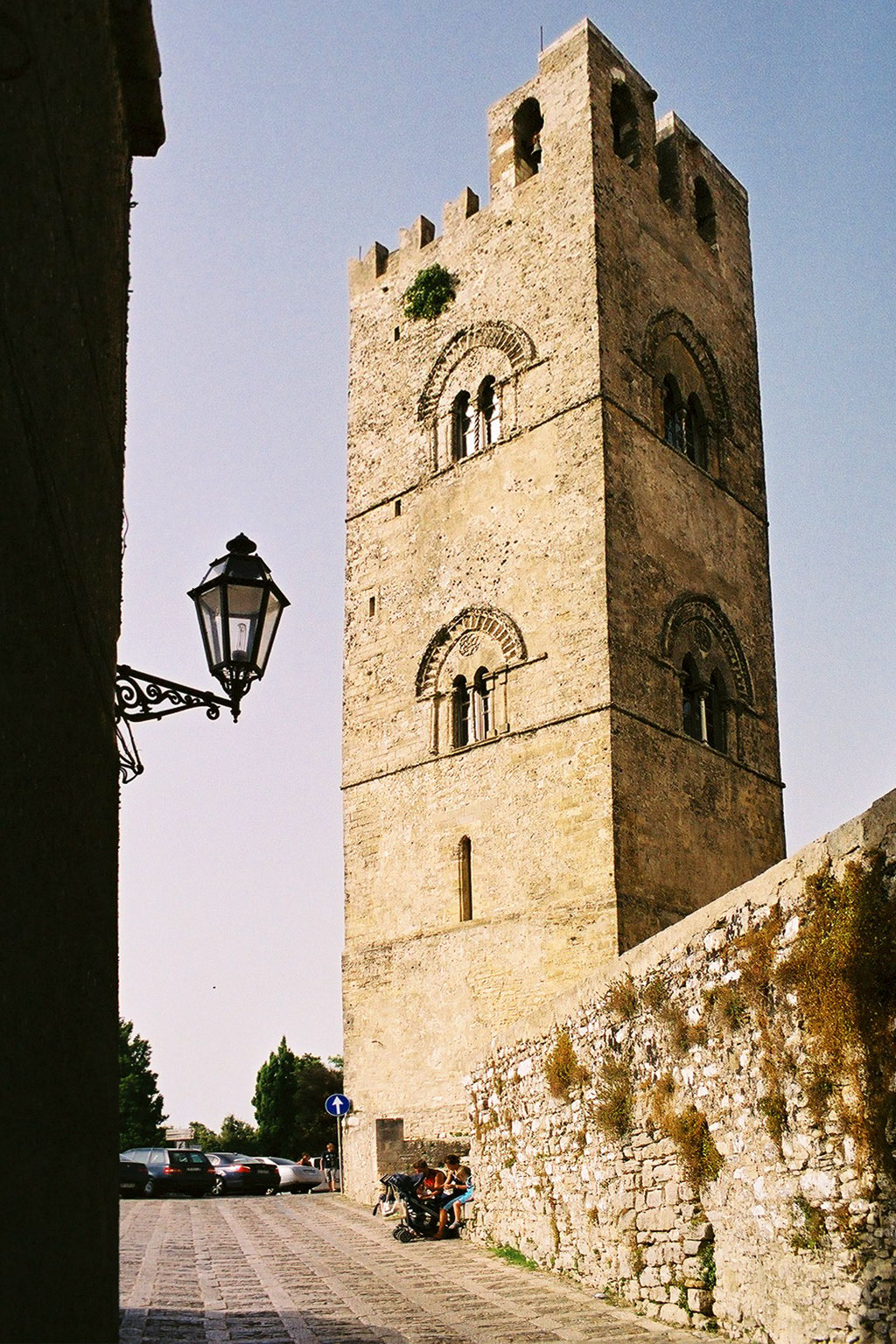
Tower of the Chiesa Madre (Cathedral)

The ancient Greek name of Erice was Eryx (Έρυξ in Greek), and its foundation was associated with the eponymous Greek hero Eryx. It was not a Greek colony, as the Phoenicians founded it, but was largely Hellenized. It was destroyed in the First Punic War by the Carthaginians, and from then on declined in importance.

Eryx was conquered by the Aghlabids in 831 and was renamed as Cebel Hamid (in Western sources Gebel Hamed, meaning Mountain of Hamid). It was ruled by the Arabs until the Norman conquest. In 1167 the Normans renamed it Monte San Giuliano, a name maintained until the 20th century.

=== 20th Century ===
In 1934 the town changed its name from Monte San Giuliano to Erice.

During the Second World War a Luftwaffe Operations Centre (associated with Zerstörergeschwader 26 and Jagdgeschwader 27 which operated out of the nearby Trapani–Milo Airport) was located on the slopes of Monte Erice from early 1943 until they were forced by Allied air raids to relocate. Following the Allied invasion of Sicily in 1943 troops of the 2nd Battalion of the 505th Infantry Regiment Seventh Army under the command of Major Mark Alexander began on 22 July 1943 to climb up the side of Monte Erice in order to secure the town and its commanding position overlooking the surrounding countryside. As they did so they came under artillery fire from Italian forces stationed on the ramparts with one soldier being killed and another wounded. Realizing that the safest position was directly under the walls of town the lead troops took shelter there. Rather than waiting on artillery support to arrive the decision was then made for F Company to attack. However before the troops had come close enough to engage them the Italian forces signaled their surrender.

== Main sights ==
In the northeastern portion of the city there are the remains of ancient Elymian and Phoenician walls (Cyclopean masonry) indicating different stages of settlement and occupation in antiquity.

There are two castles that remain in the city: Pepoli Castle, which dates from Saracen times, and the Castello di Venere ("Venus Castle"), dating from the Norman period, built on top of the ancient Temple of Venus, where Venus Ericina was worshipped. According to legend, the temple was founded by Aeneas. It was well known throughout the Mediterranean area in the ancient age, and an important cult was celebrated in it. In his book On the Nature of Animals, Aelian writes that animals chosen for sacrifice would voluntarily walk up to the altar to be killed.

A cable car (funivia) ran from 2005 to 2017, when it was closed due to a forest fire, from the outskirts of Trapani to the town of Erice. The cable car was rebuilt and reopened in June 2018.

== Culture ==
Erice hosts scientific meetings at the Ettore Majorana center, organised by the astrophysicist Antonino Zichichi. There is also an annual workshop on Molecular Gastronomy.

== Gallery ==
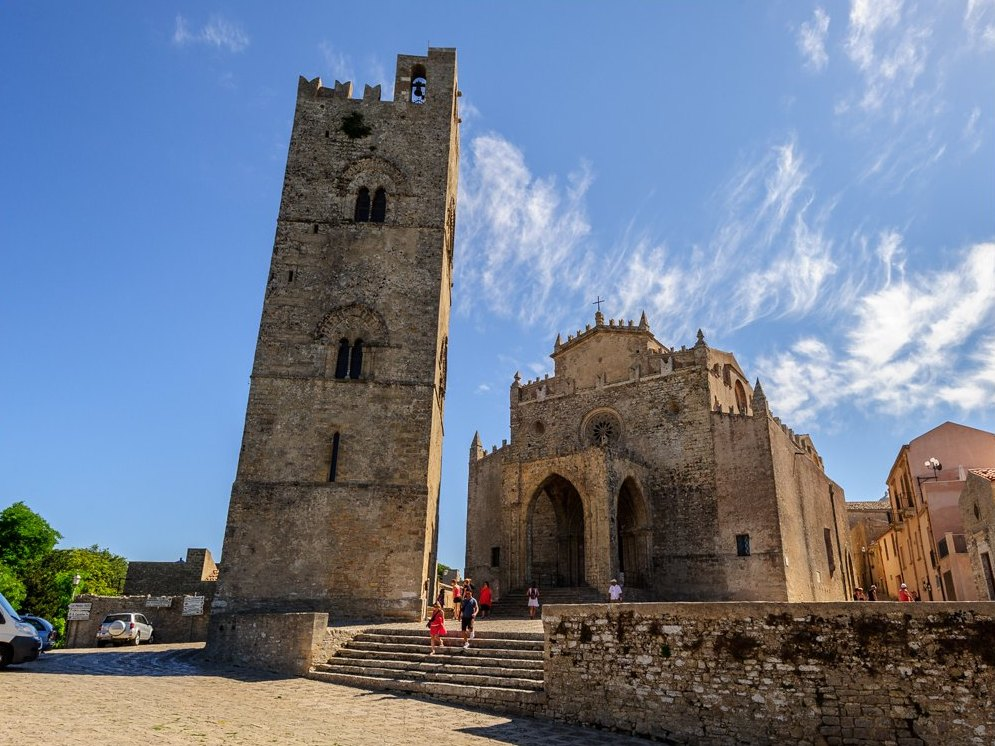
Erice Cathedral with its bell tower

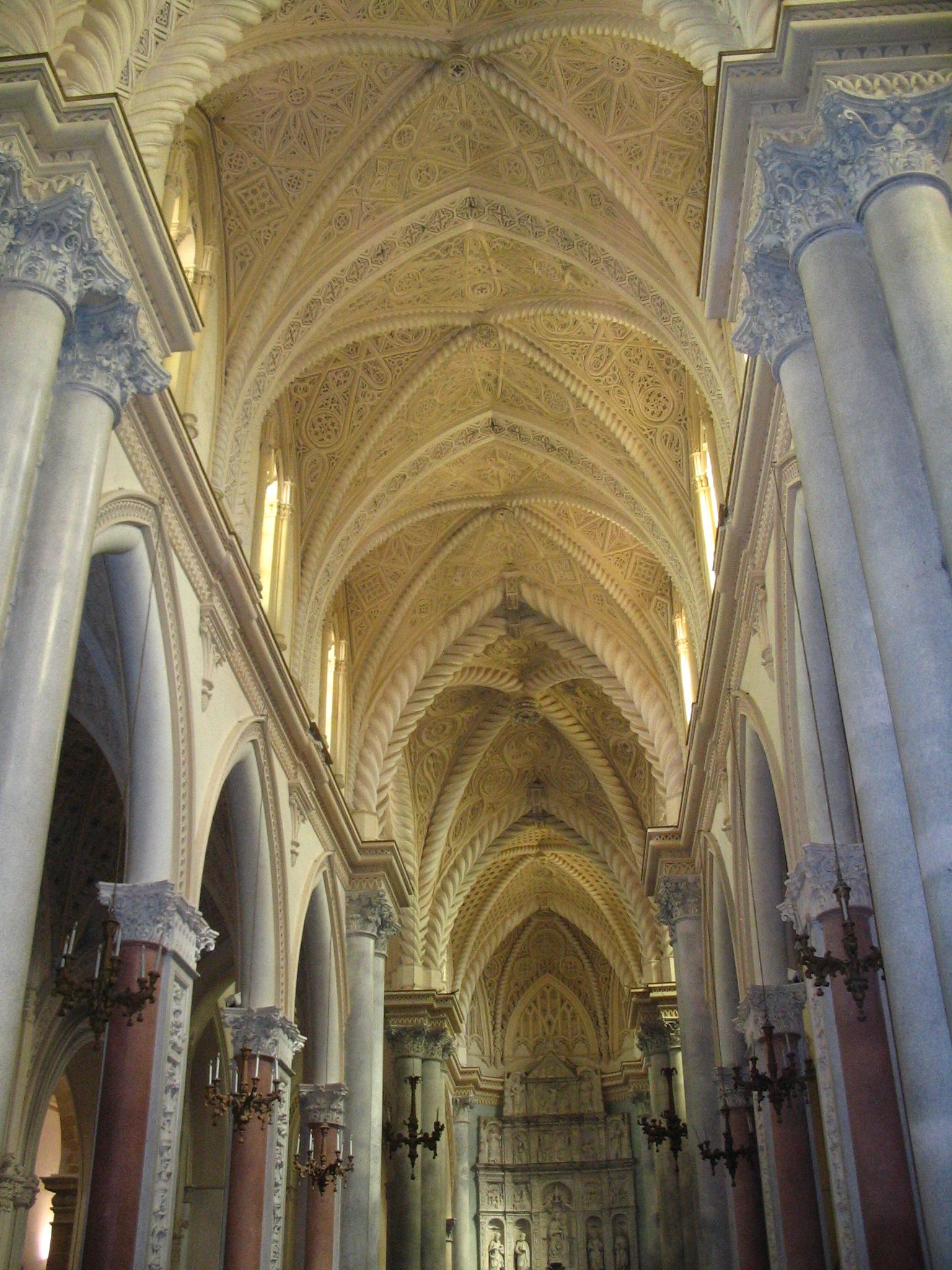
View inside the Cathedral

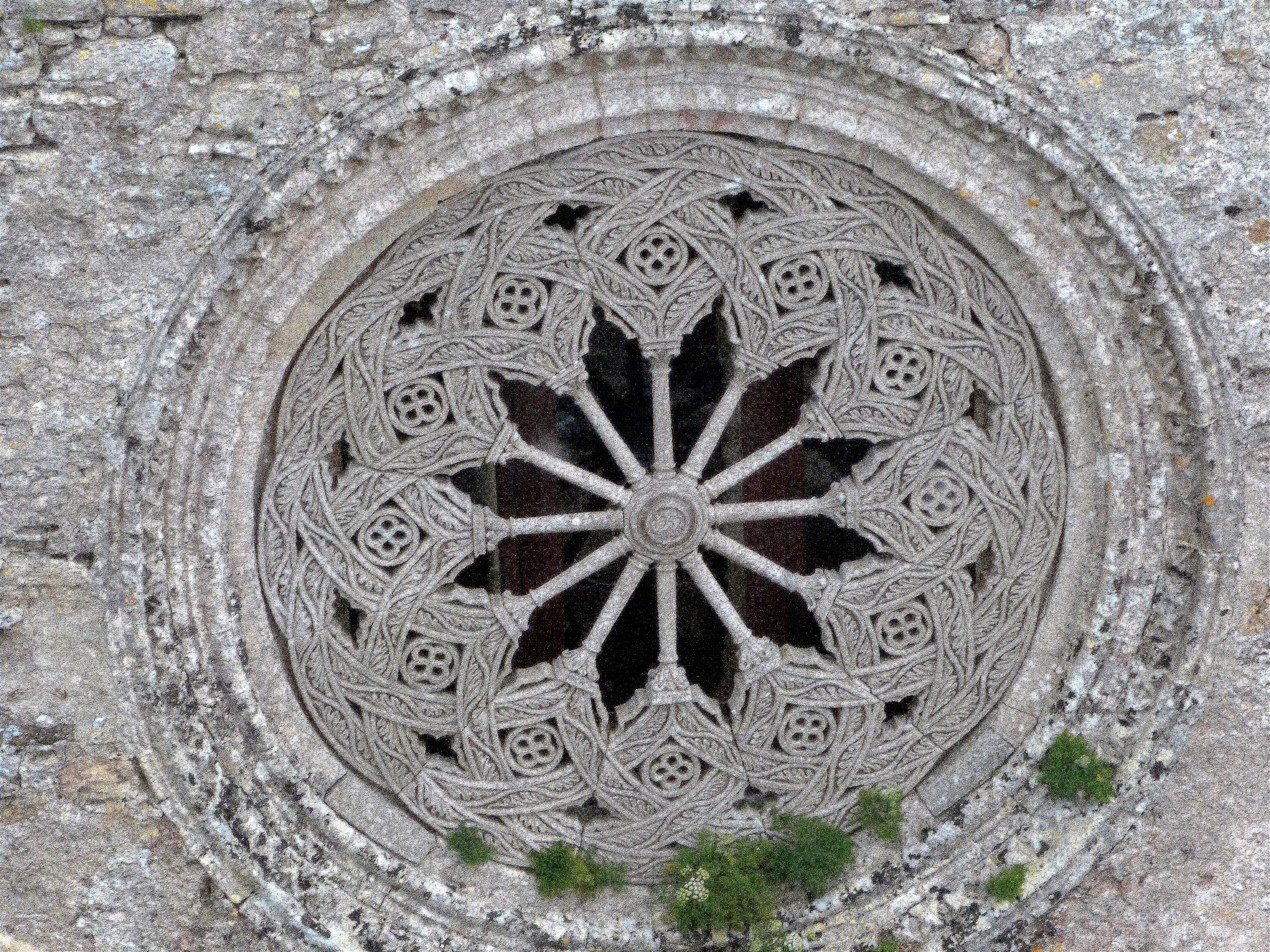
Rose window of the Cathedral

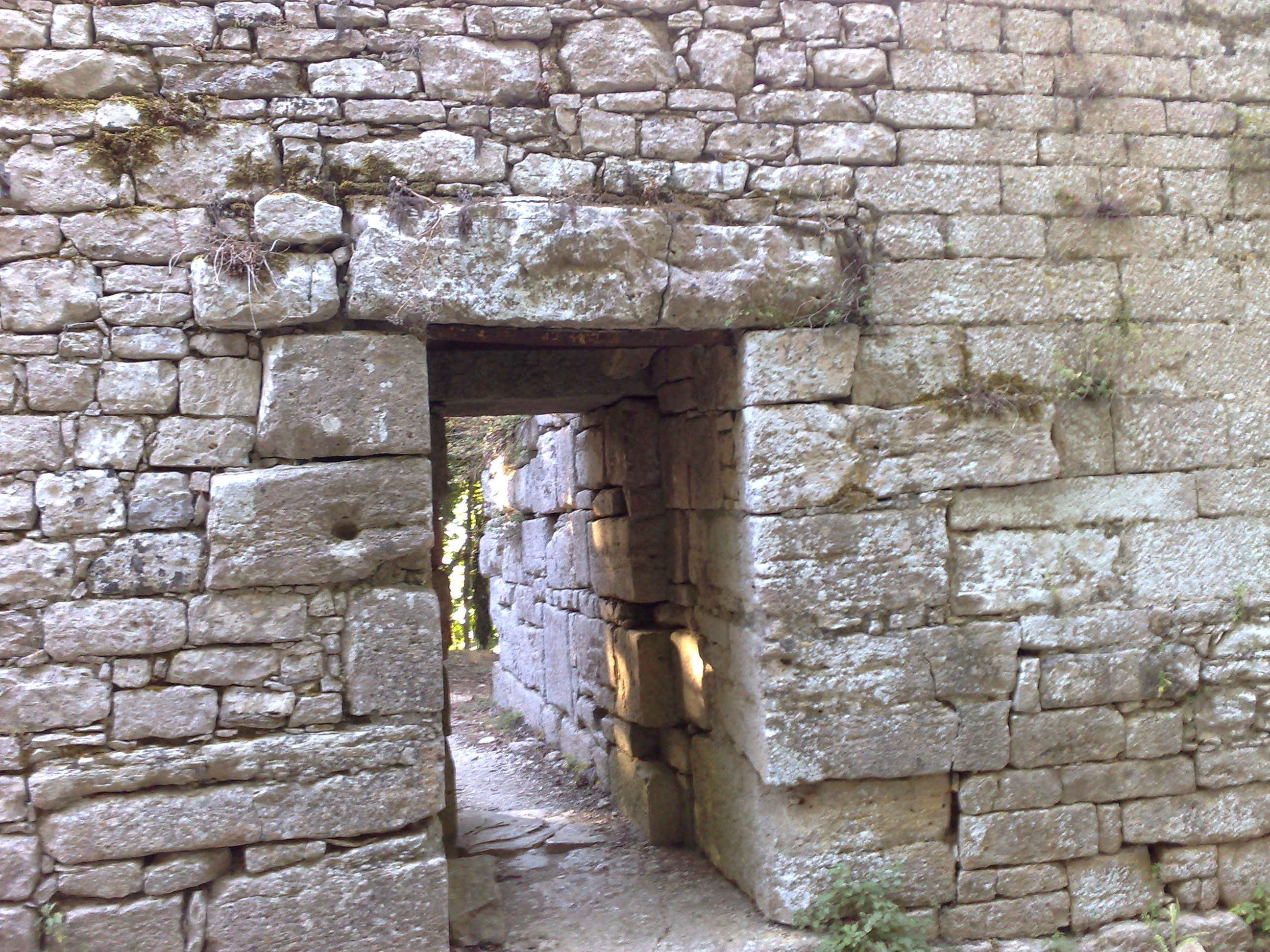
Cyclopean masonry

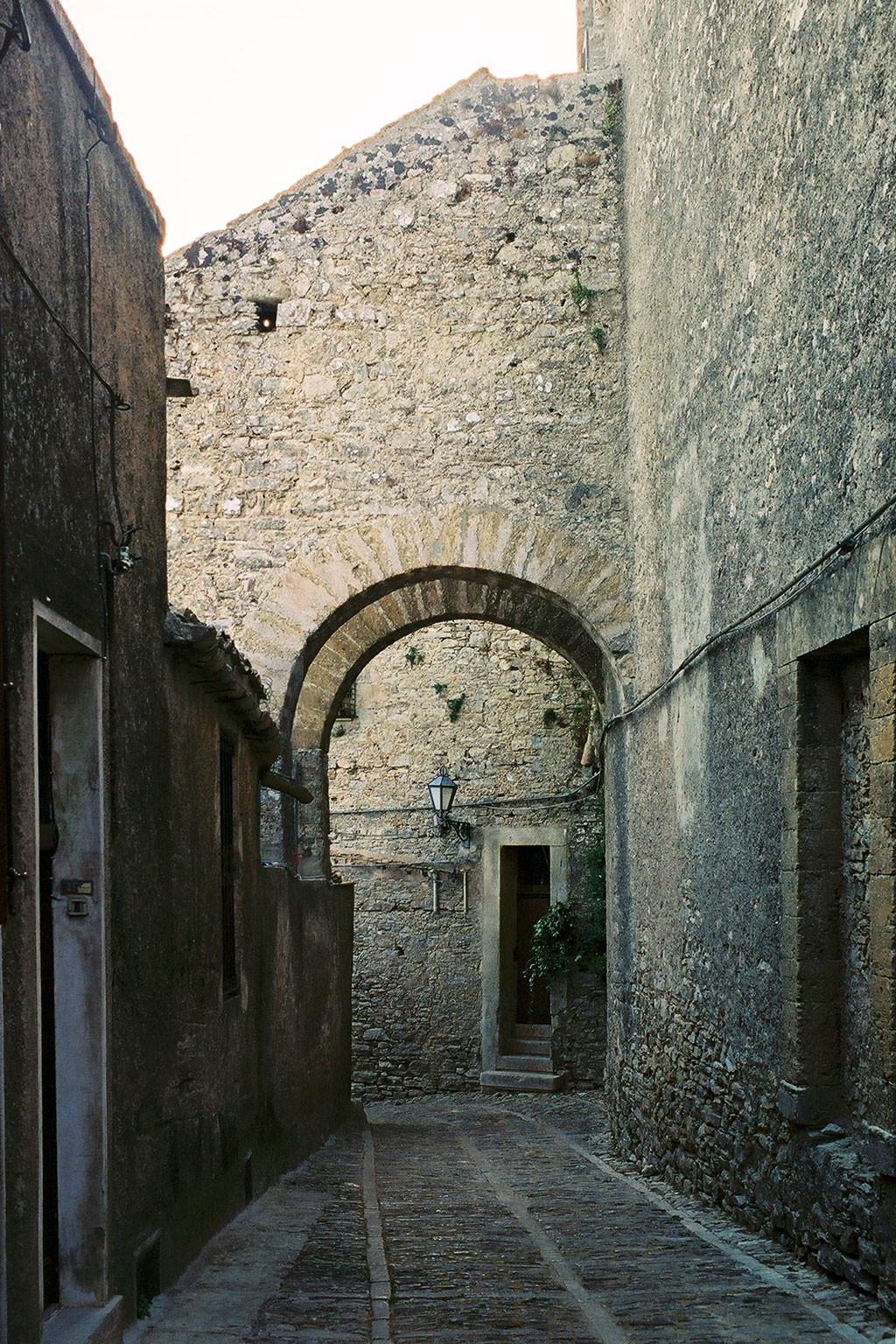
Via San Carlo

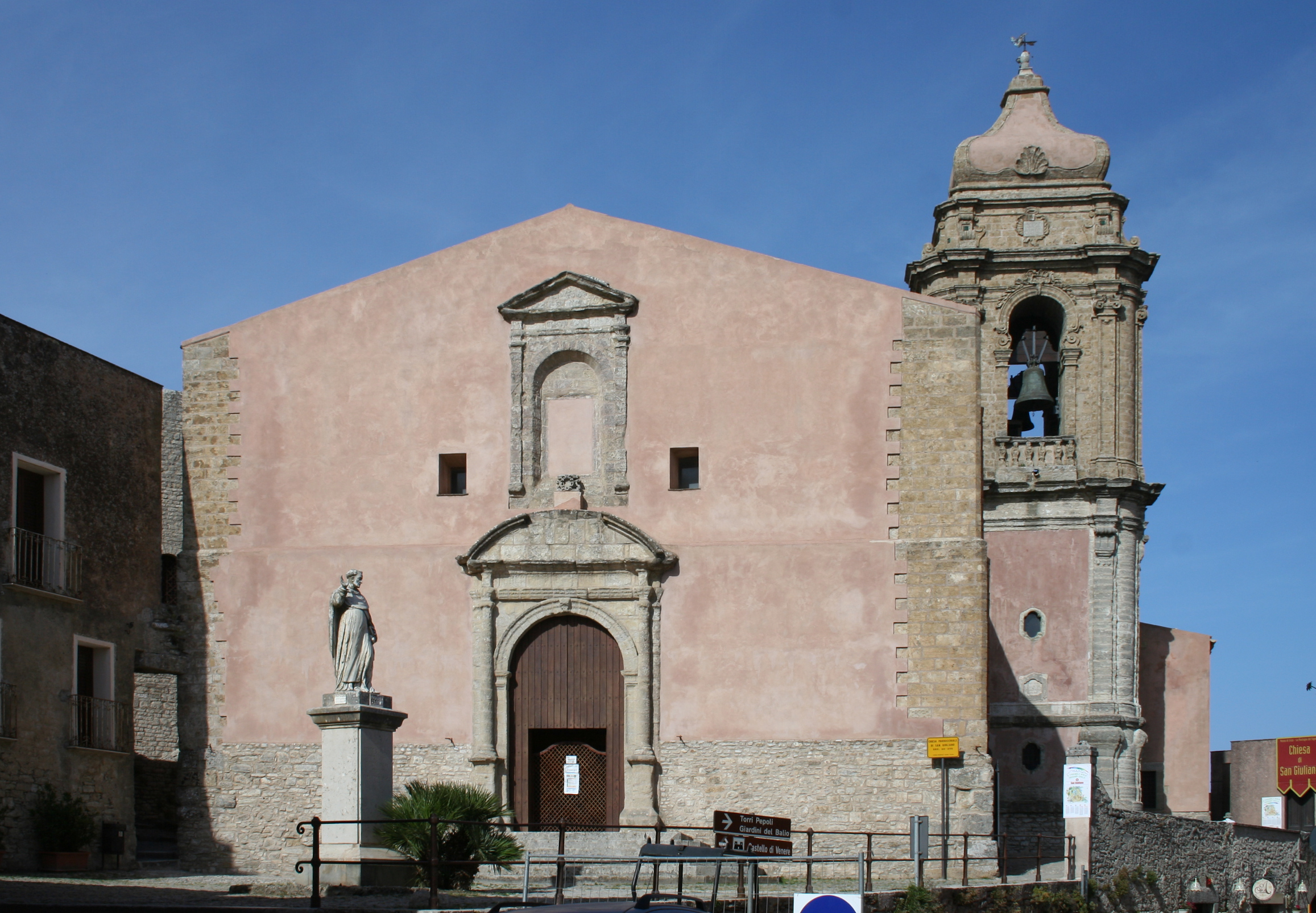
St Julian's Church

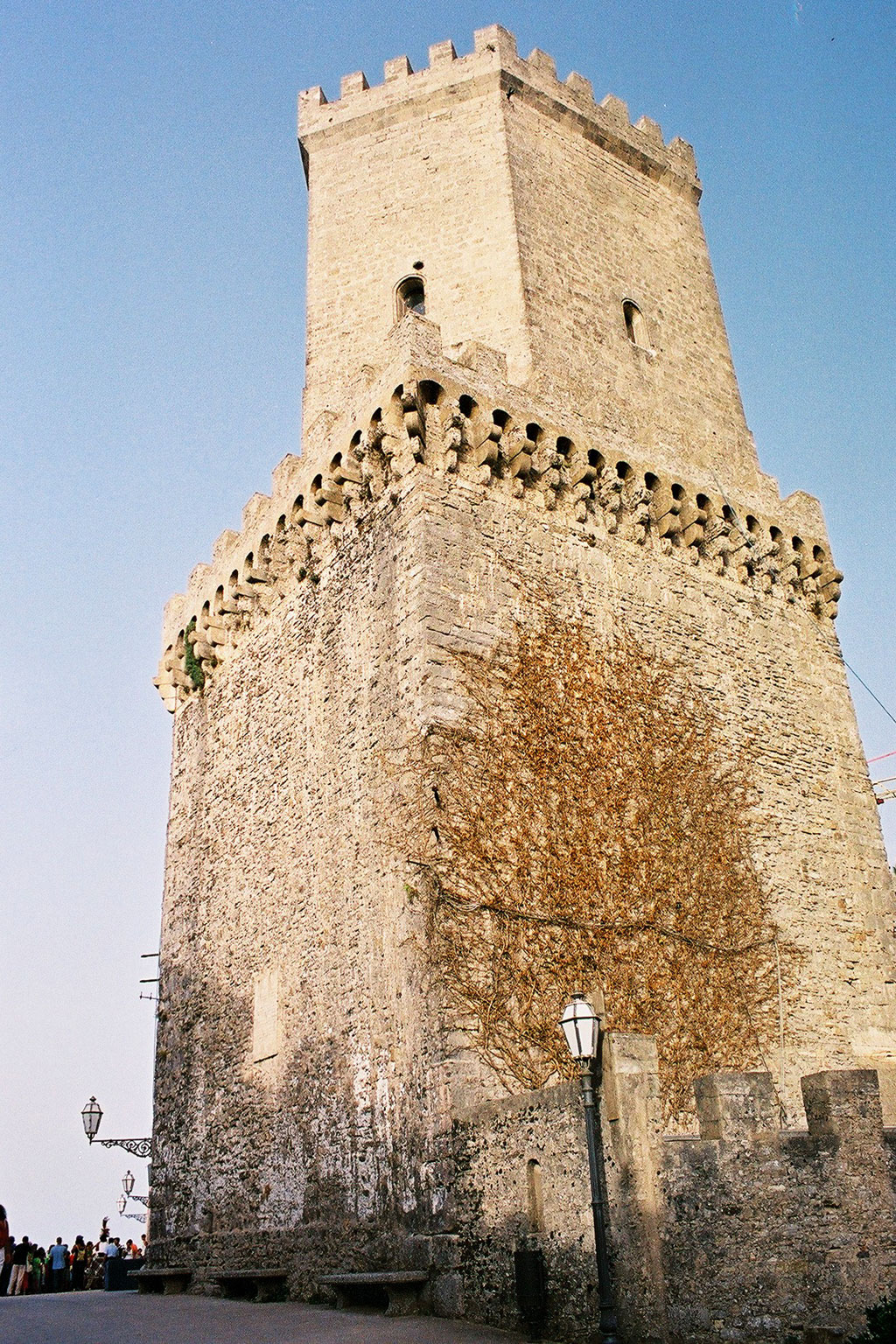
Castle of Balio

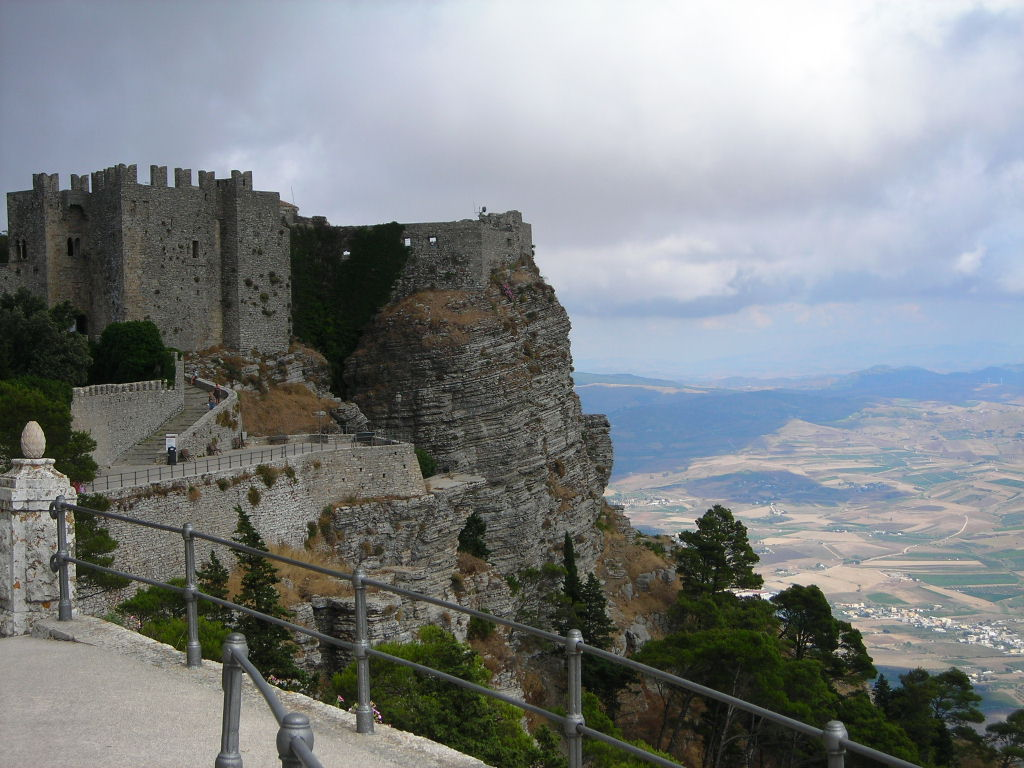
The stronghold and Castle of Venere

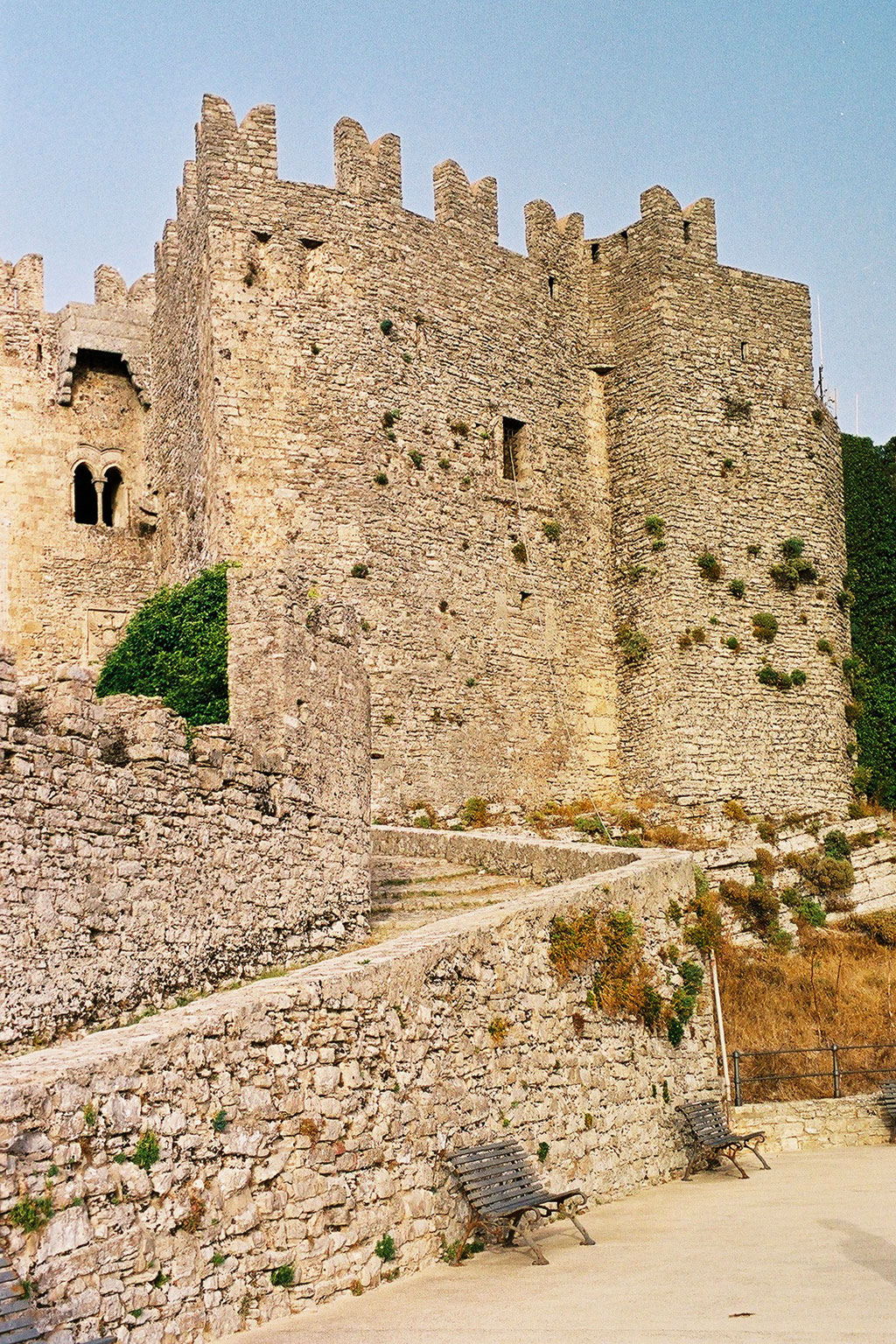
Castle of Venere

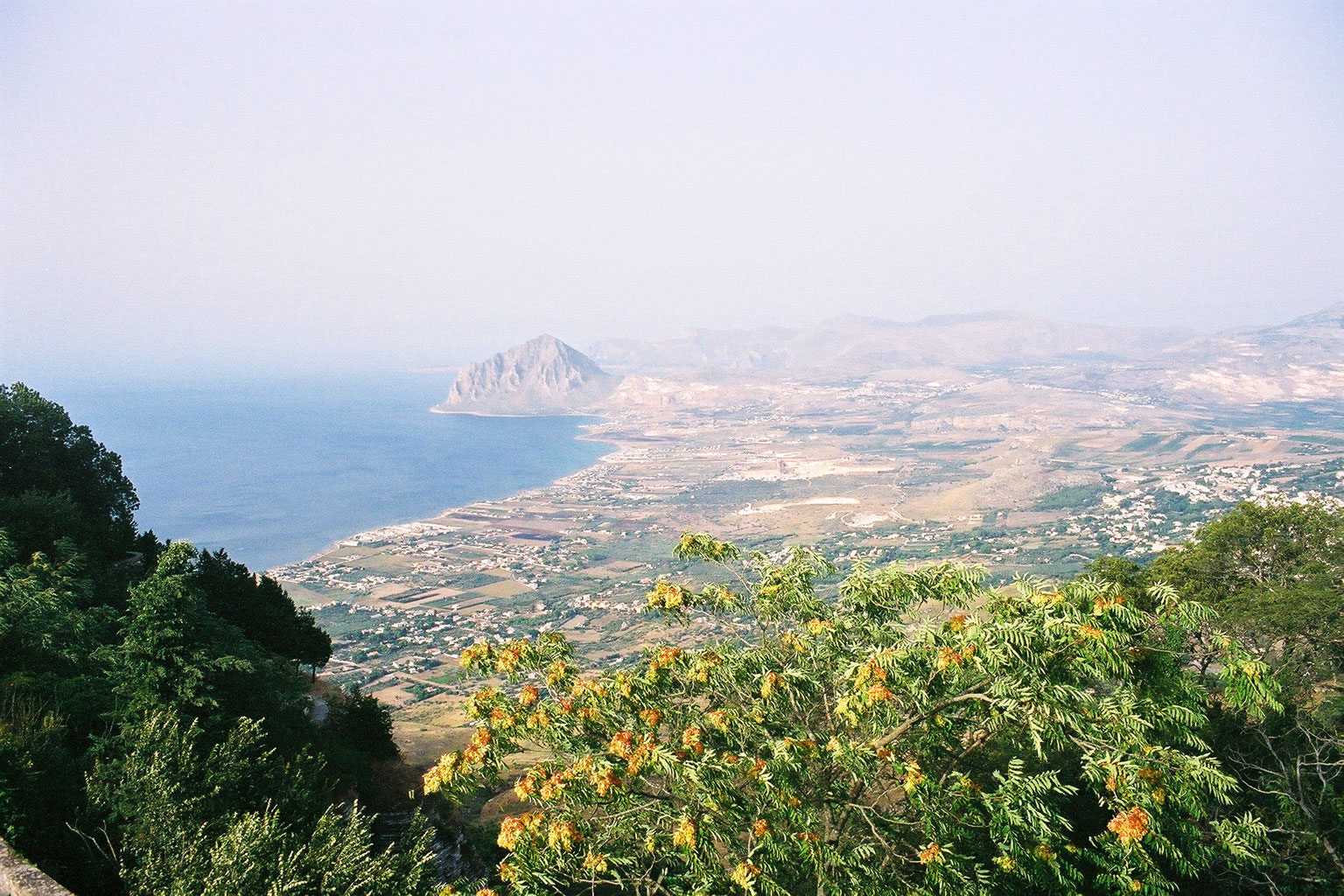
View of monte Cofano

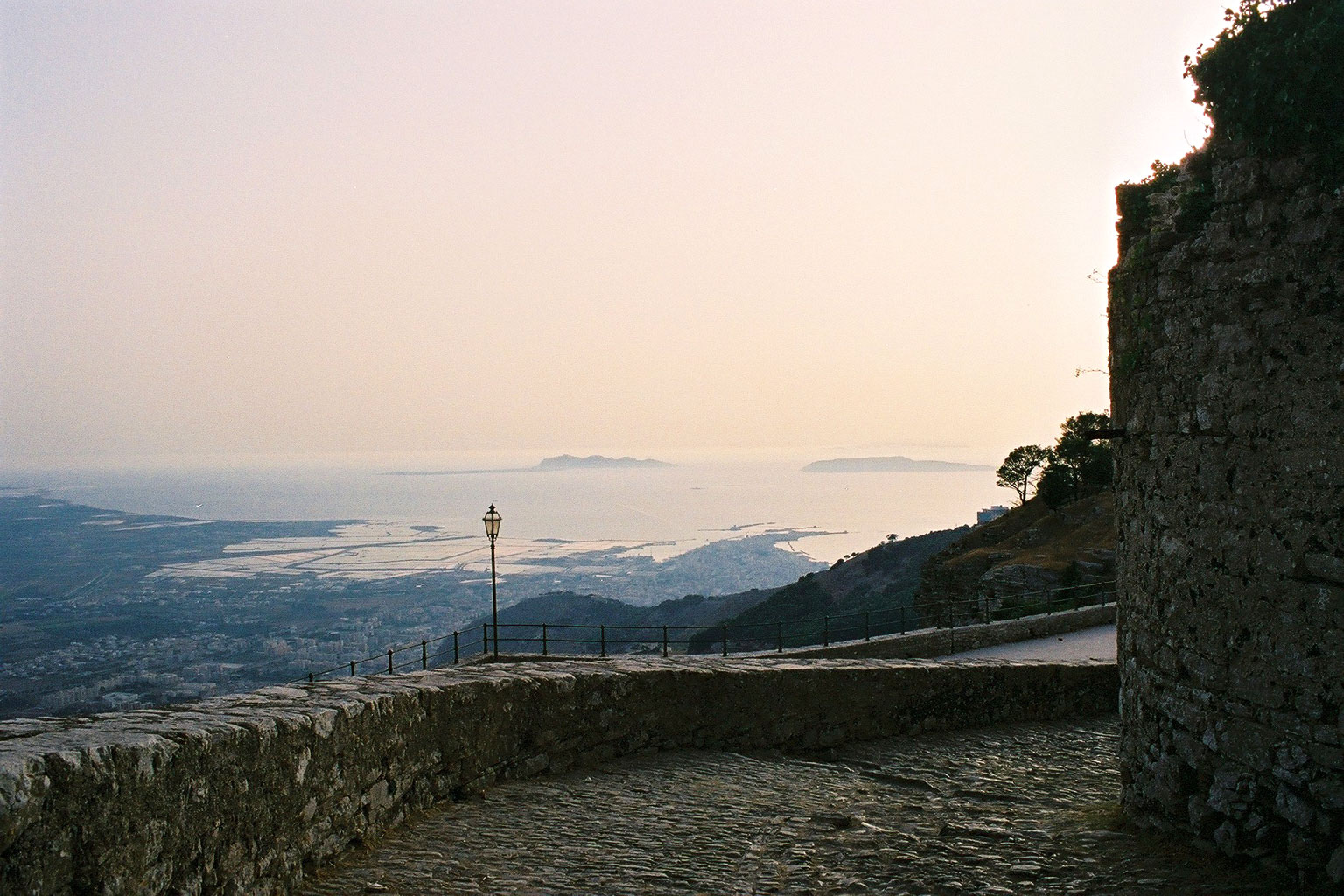
Trapani seen from the castle

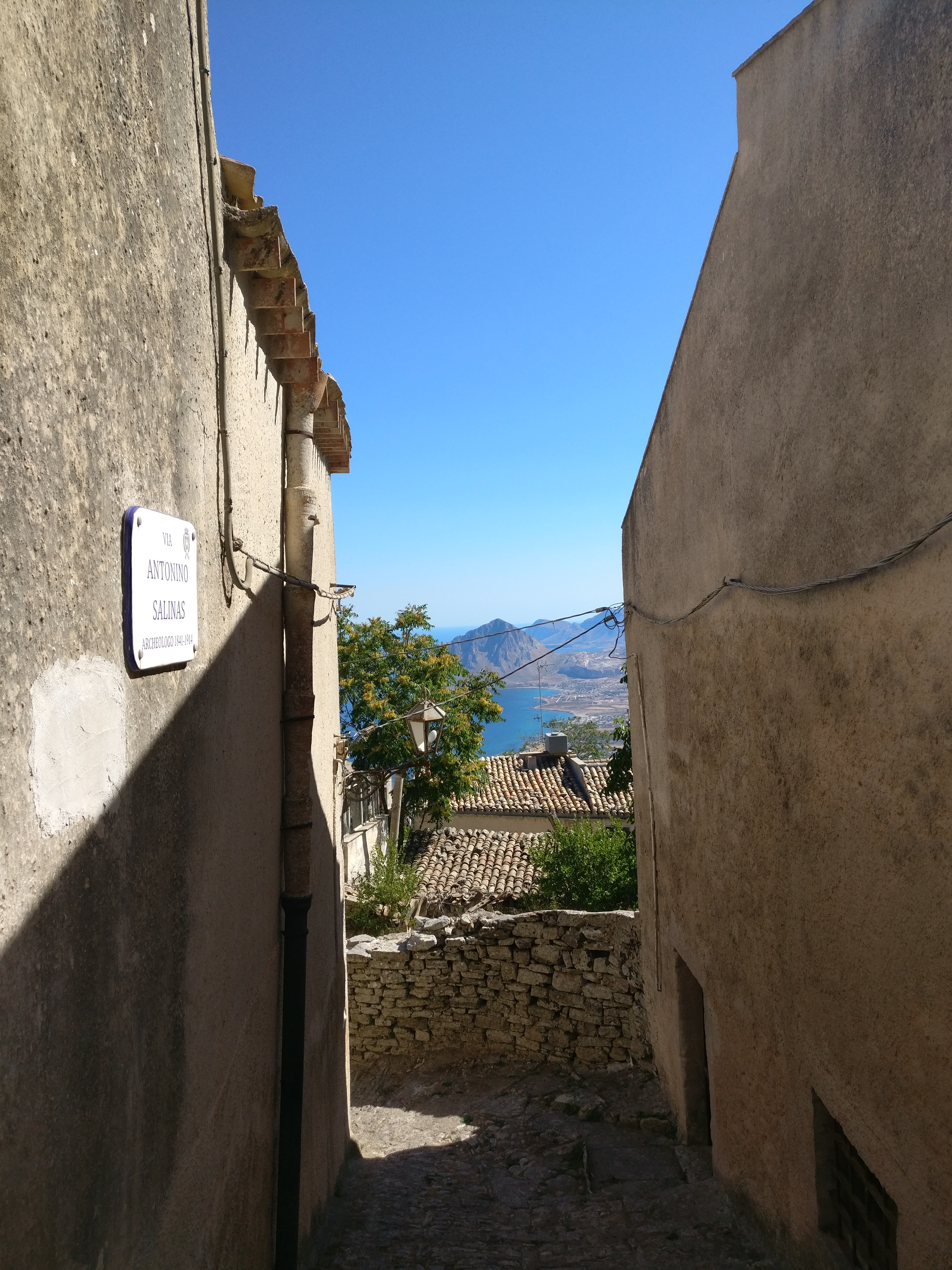
Monte Cofano seen from an alley in Erice

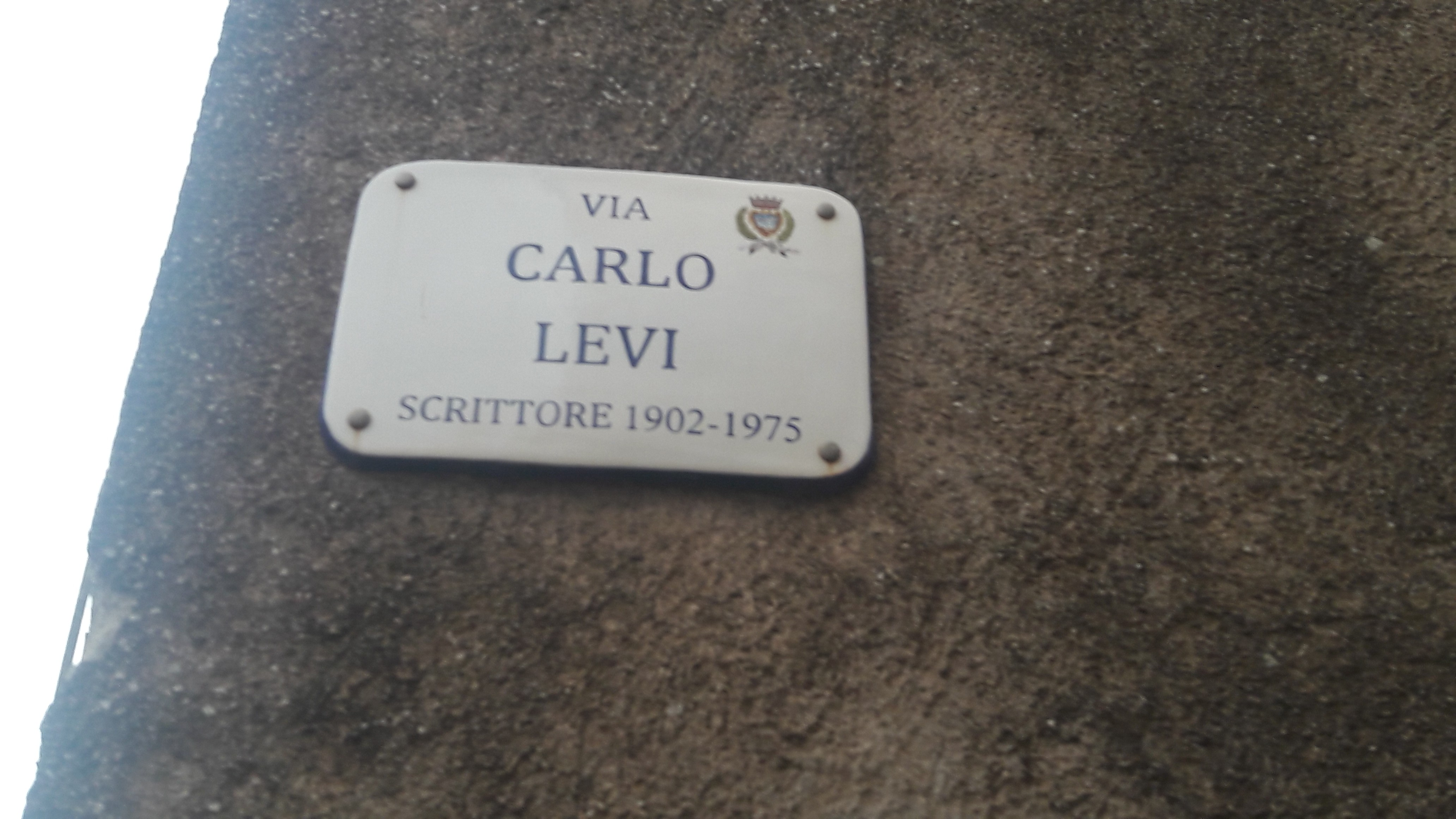
Via Carlo Levi 1902-1975
