= Buseto Palizzolo =

- Comune
- Comune di Buseto Palizzolo
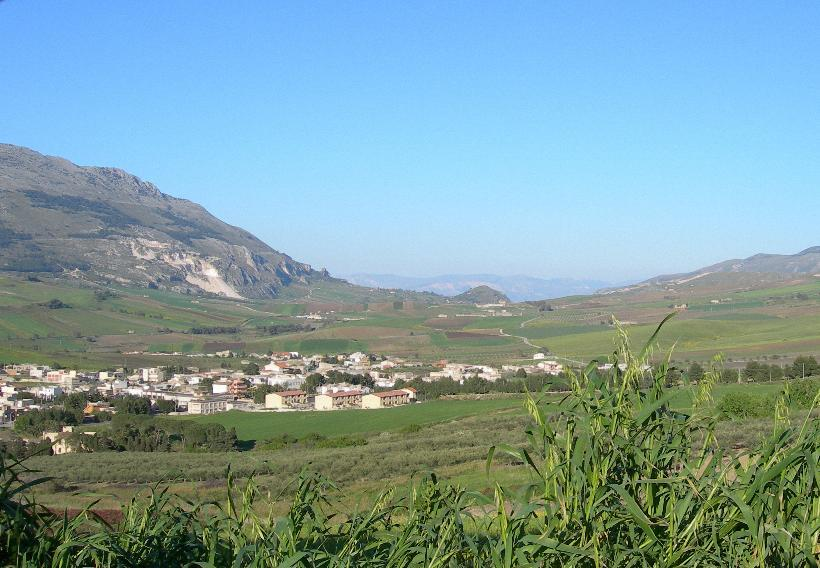

- Location within Italy Location within Sicily
- Coordinates: 38°1′N 12°44′E
- Country: Italy
- Region: Sicily
- Province: Trapani (TP)

Government
  - Mayor: oberto Maiorana

Area
  - Total: 72.81 km^{2} (28.11 sq mi)
- Elevation: 249 m (817 ft)

Population (28 February 2017)
  - Total: 2,944
  - Density: 40.43/km^{2} (104.7/sq mi)
- Demonym: Busetani
- Time zone: UTC+1 (CET)
  - Summer (DST): UTC+2 (CEST)
- Postal code: 91012
- Dialing code: 0923
- Patron saint: Maria SS. del Carmelo
- Saint day: July 16
- Website: Official website

Buseto Palizzolo (Sicilian: Palazzolu) is a town and comune in North-Western Sicily, Italy, administratively part of the province of Trapani.

== Geography ==
Buseto Palizzolo is located in the hills east of Trapani, the highest of which is Monte Luziano with a height of 500 metres above sea level. Buseto Palizzolo is composed of various areas and hamlets, without a main central settlement. The main settlements are Buseto Centro, Badia, Battaglia, Buseto Superiore, and Pianoneve. These settlements blur into one another, but the frazioni of Bruca, Fazio, and Città Povera are located at a distance of 11, 5, and 6 km respectively from the centre.

3 km southeast of Buseto Superiore is Bosco di Scorace, a vast wooded area which is among the largest in western Sicily.

== History ==
The comune of Buseto Palizzolo, like those of Valderice, Custonaci and San Vito Lo Capo, were created as a result of the division of the very large comune of Monte San Giuliano during the 1930s.
