= Altavilla =

Village in the canton of Fribourg, Switzerland

Coordinates: 46°55′58.08″N 7°9′9.64″E

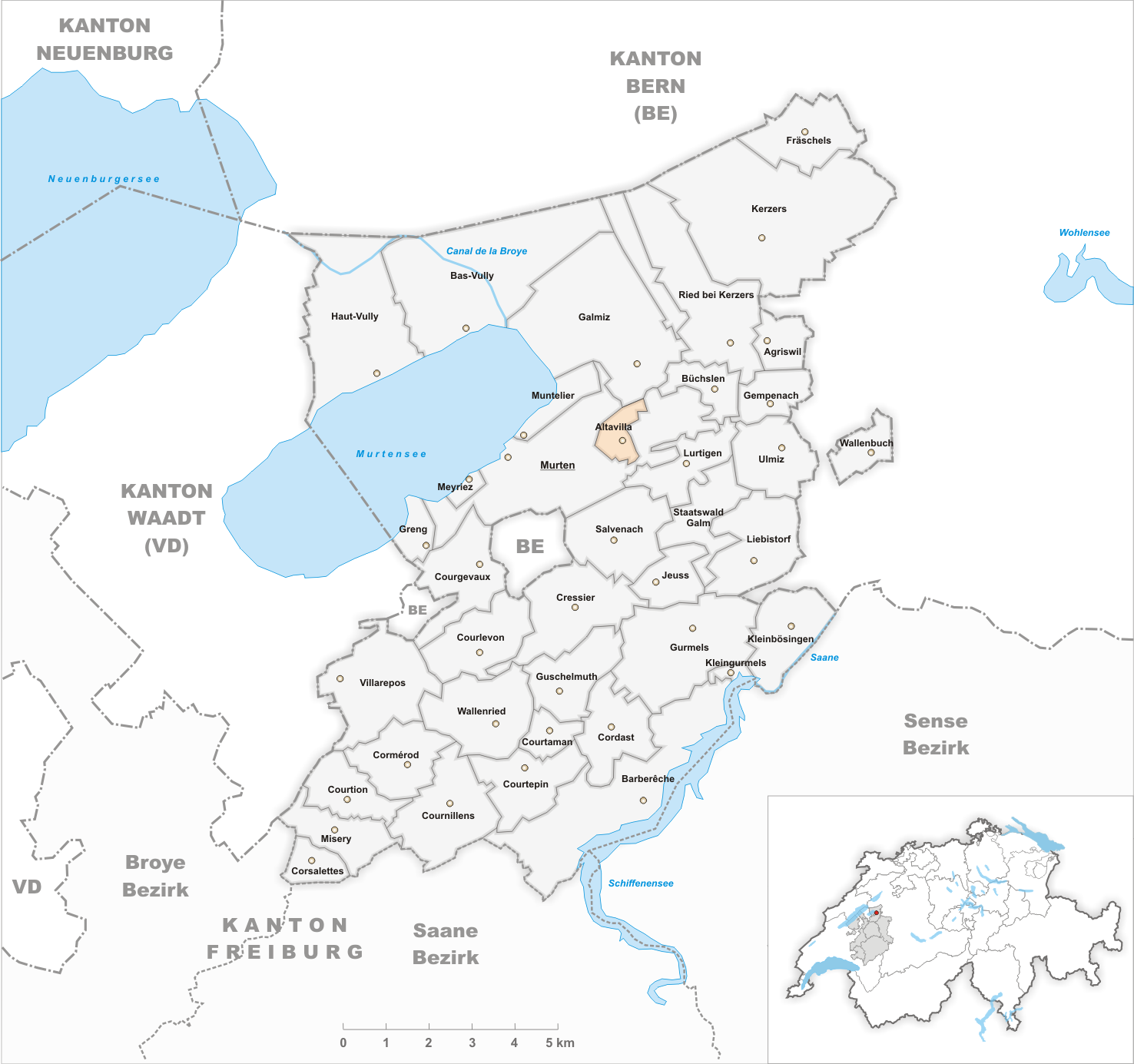
Map showing Altavilla in Switzerland

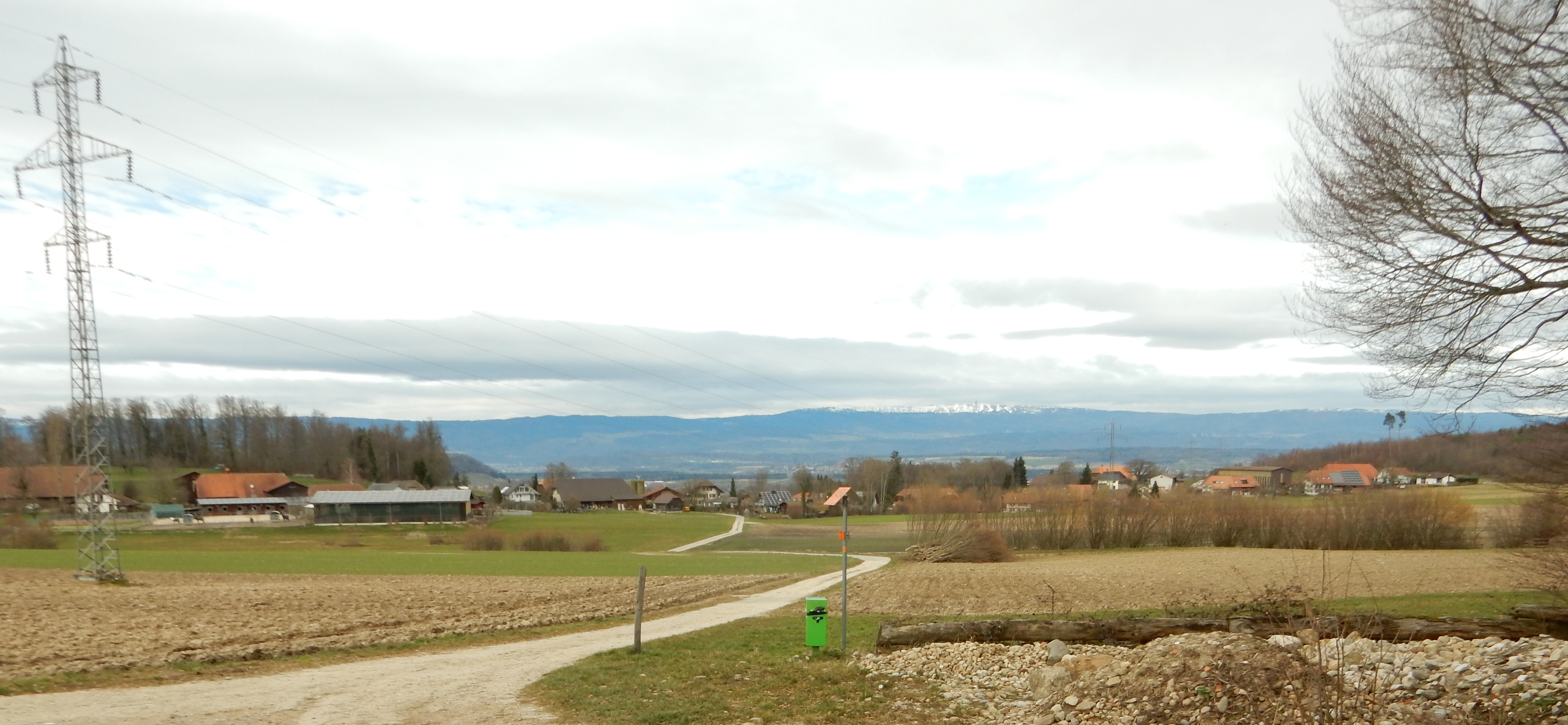
A part of Altavilla FR Switzerland

Altavilla is a village and former municipality in the district of See in the canton of Fribourg, Switzerland.

== History ==
It was first recorded in 1340 as Alta villa. It has also had the German name Altenfüllen and the French Hauteville.

The municipality had 180 inhabitants in 1850, which decreased to and 136 in 1900 and 89 in 1970. It then rose again, to 117 in 1990.

In 1991 the municipality was incorporated into the larger, neighboring municipality Murten.
