= Valderice =

- Comune
- Comune di Valderice
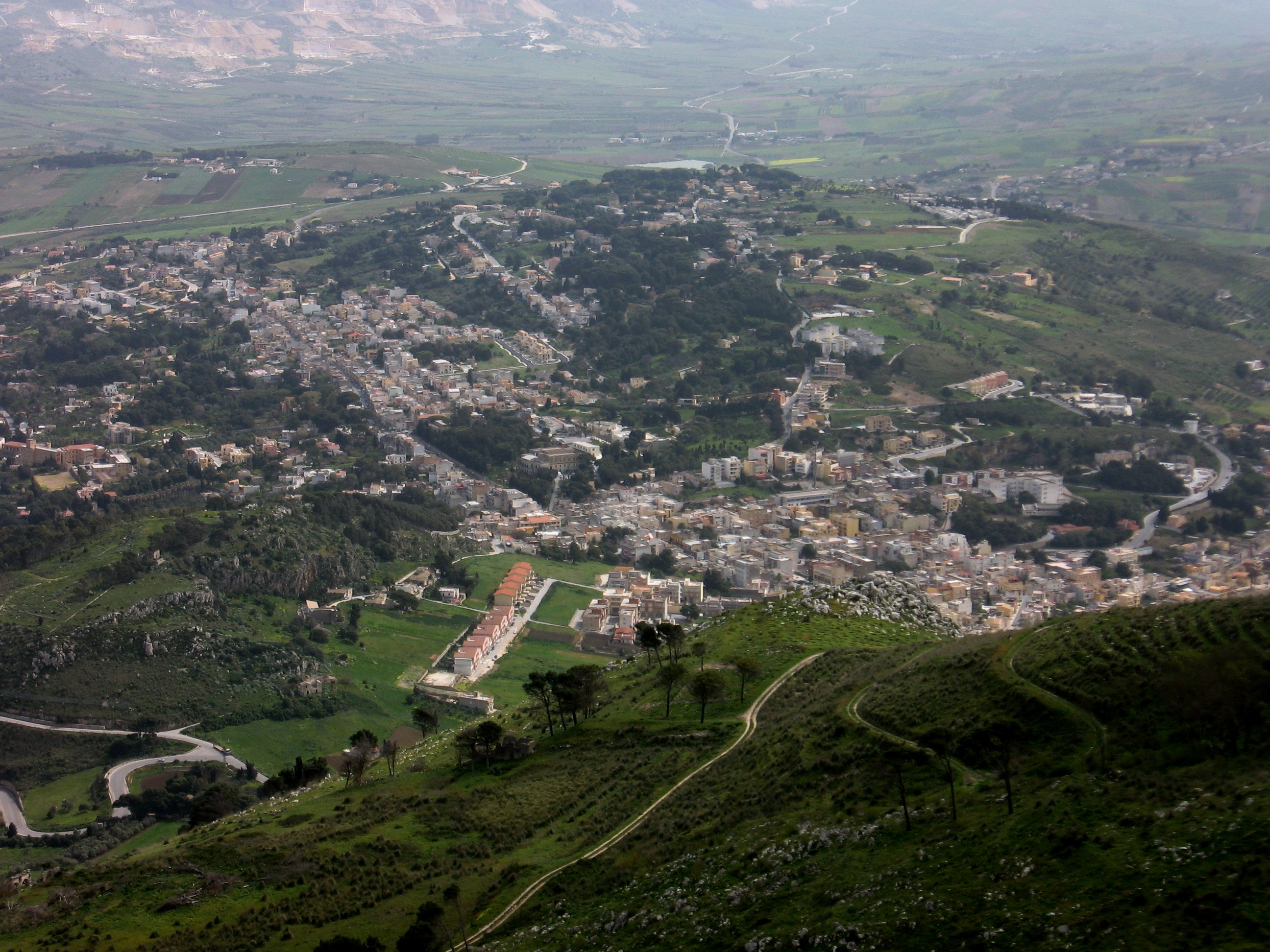

- Location within Italy Location within Sicily
- Coordinates: 38°3′N 12°37′E
- Country: Italy
- Region: Sicily
- Province: Trapani (TP)
- Frazioni: Bonagia, Sant'Andrea, Crocevie, Lentina, Casalbianco, Chiesanuova, Crocci, Lenzi

Government
  - Mayor: Francesco Stabile

Area
  - Total: 52.96 km^{2} (20.45 sq mi)
- Elevation: 240 m (790 ft)

Population (28 February 2017)
  - Total: 12,301
  - Density: 232.3/km^{2} (601.6/sq mi)
- Demonym: Valdericini
- Time zone: UTC+1 (CET)
  - Summer (DST): UTC+2 (CEST)
- Postal code: 91019
- Dialing code: 0923
- Website: Official website

Valderice (Sicilian: Valdèrici) is a town and comune in North-Western Sicily, Italy, administratively part of the province of Trapani. The city is located in the inland, close to the provincial capital city of Trapani, but includes also a seaside frazione, Bonagia, in its territory.

Previously called Paparella, the comune was created following the division of the comune of Monte San Giuliano, which had contained Erice, Custonaci and Buseto Palizzolo, as well as Valderice. It is the chief comune of the five Elimo-ericini communi and the most populous of them; it is the eighth most populous comune in the province.

Valderice contains several scenic areas: hills, wooded areas, beaches, sea-cliffs, and countryside. There are three beach resorts: Bonagia, Lido Valderice, and Rio Forgia beach.

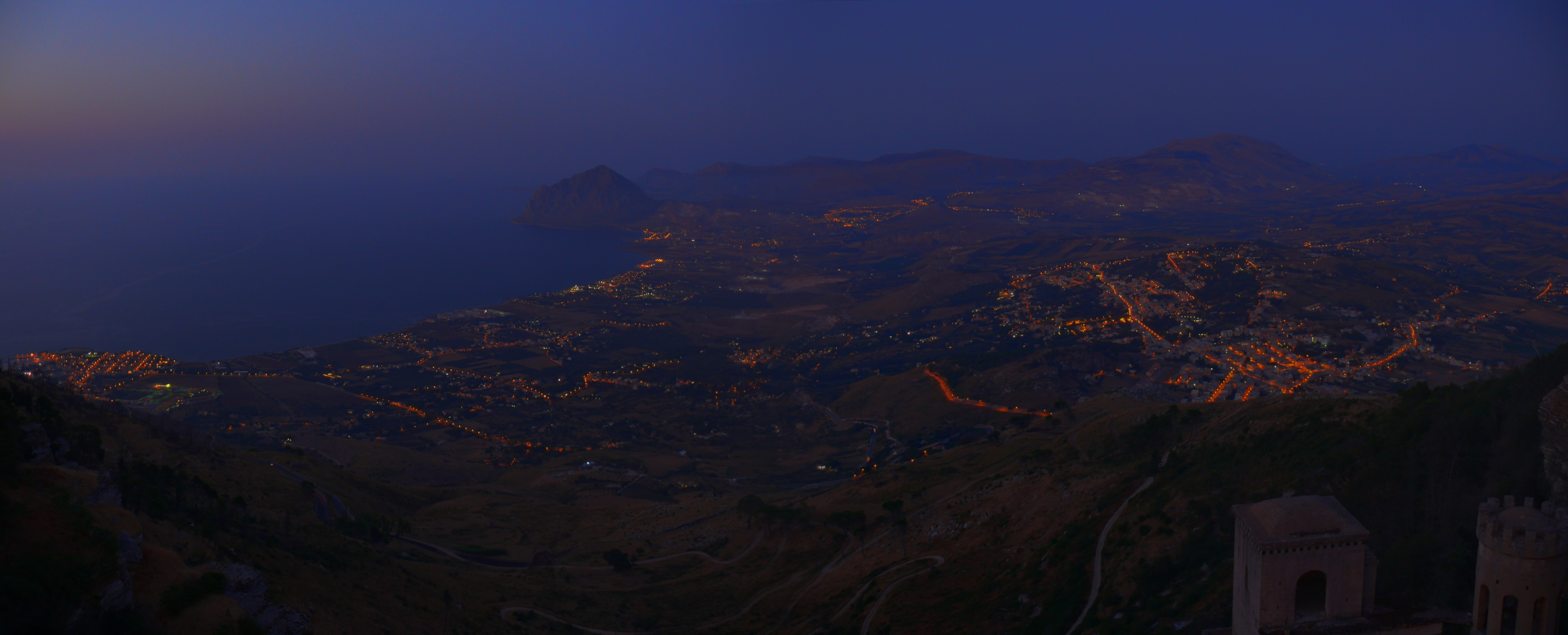
Valderice by Gabriel Valentini

== History ==
The history of Valderice is connected to that of Monte Erice, since the population moved from there to the fertile valleys of the mountain, establishing settlements like S. Marco, Ragosia, Misericordia, S. Andrea, Bonagia, Casalbianco, Crocci, Chiesanuova, Lenzi, Fico e Crocevie.

With the end of Fascism in 1943, the socialist Gaspare di Vita was elected mayor at Erice He did not resolve the controversy then raging about the position of Erice as the chief settlement of the area.

However, after the 1946 elections, a left wing administration was formed and the question of Erice's position was reopened and the various frazioni renewed their calls for autonomy. San Vito Lo Capo, Buseto Palizzolo, and Custonaci were the first to receive administrative autonomy. On 28 January 1955, San Marco, Peparella and the neighbouring frazioni were split off in order to form the comune of Paparella-San Marco, which was renamed Valderice on 25 January 1958.
