= Piazza Bagolino =

Square in Trapani, Italy

Coordinates: 37.981473°N 12.969136°E

- {{{other_names}}}
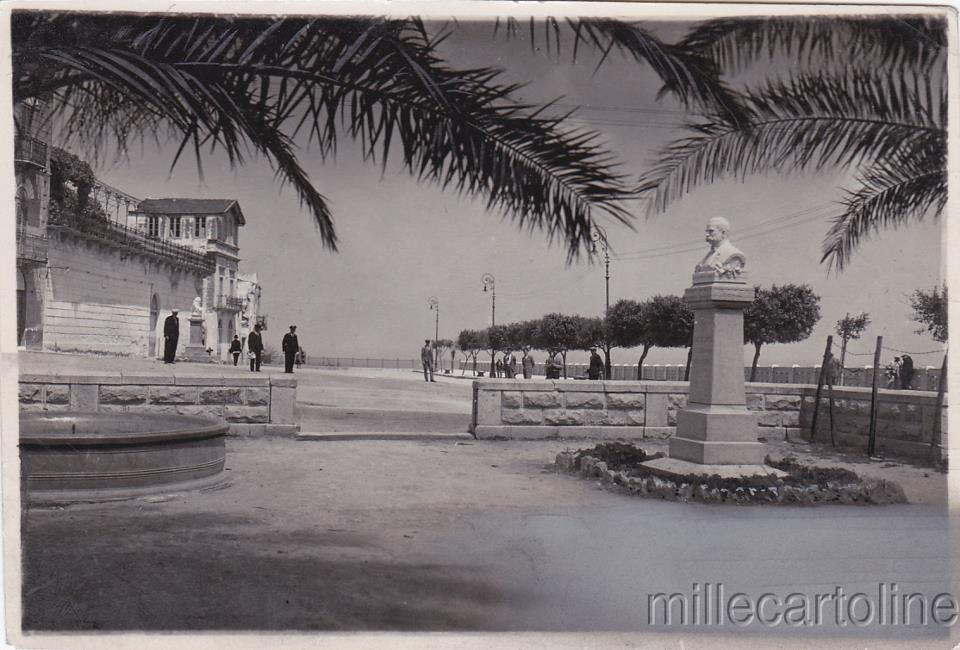
- Features: Parco suburbano San Francesco, Church of Saint Francis of Assisi,
- Design: Fra Cipolla from Nicosia
- Surface: asphalt
- Location: Alcamo, Italy
- Interactive map of Piazza Bagolino
- Coordinates

Piazza Bagolino is one of the main squares of Alcamo, in the province of Trapani. It is located near the town centre and it is one of the town attractions.

== History ==
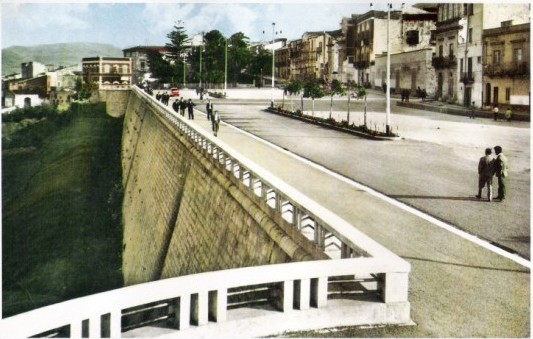
An old picture of the Bastiuni

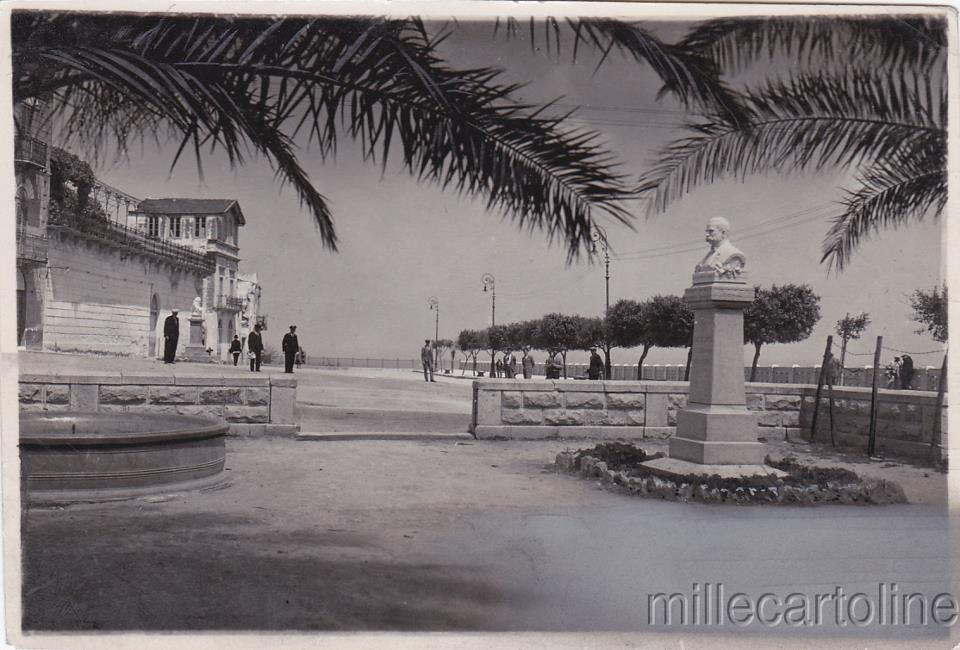
Piazza Bagolino seen from the public garden

At the beginning of the 17th century there was only a small flat area called Terra Nova or San Francesco, then by order of the governor of Alcamo, Don Pietro Balsamo, they began the works for the opening of Corso 6 Aprile. The part underlying the square was used for the extraction of Calcarenite, and there were many caves that were once employed as dwellings, and later, thanks to their favourable temperature, for the processing of calfskins.

As people used the area for a dumping ground, it was necessary a work of consolidation and settling in order to avoid landslides: it was made according to the project of the engineer Fra Cipolla from Nicosia in the early 19th century.

In 1930 they realized the walls of the bastion and restored and fenced the small garden, called Villa Margherita of Savoy at that time: they also planted several trees and flowers, placing a rounded pond. The next year there was a flood which provoked a landslide, but only in 1946 they consolidated the square, in order to protect the front houses too. During this phase they made the drainage and reinforcement works, realized the staircase leading to Parco suburbano San Francesco, and settled the square by planting some trees and make the flooring, together with minor works.

In 1950 they also added a travertine parapet, from which we can admire the beautiful landscape of Gulf of Castellammare and placed some benches, while on the west side (after Palazzo Mistretta-Galati) they placed the bust of the famous poet Sebastiano Bagolino realized by Giuseppe Bambina, a sculptor from Alcamo; another bust, representing the scientist Girolamo Caruso, was located at the entrance of the public garden.

Finally, in 2012, the square was restored again, in the present form, by the municipal administration led by Lord Mayor Giacomo Scala.

=== Description ===
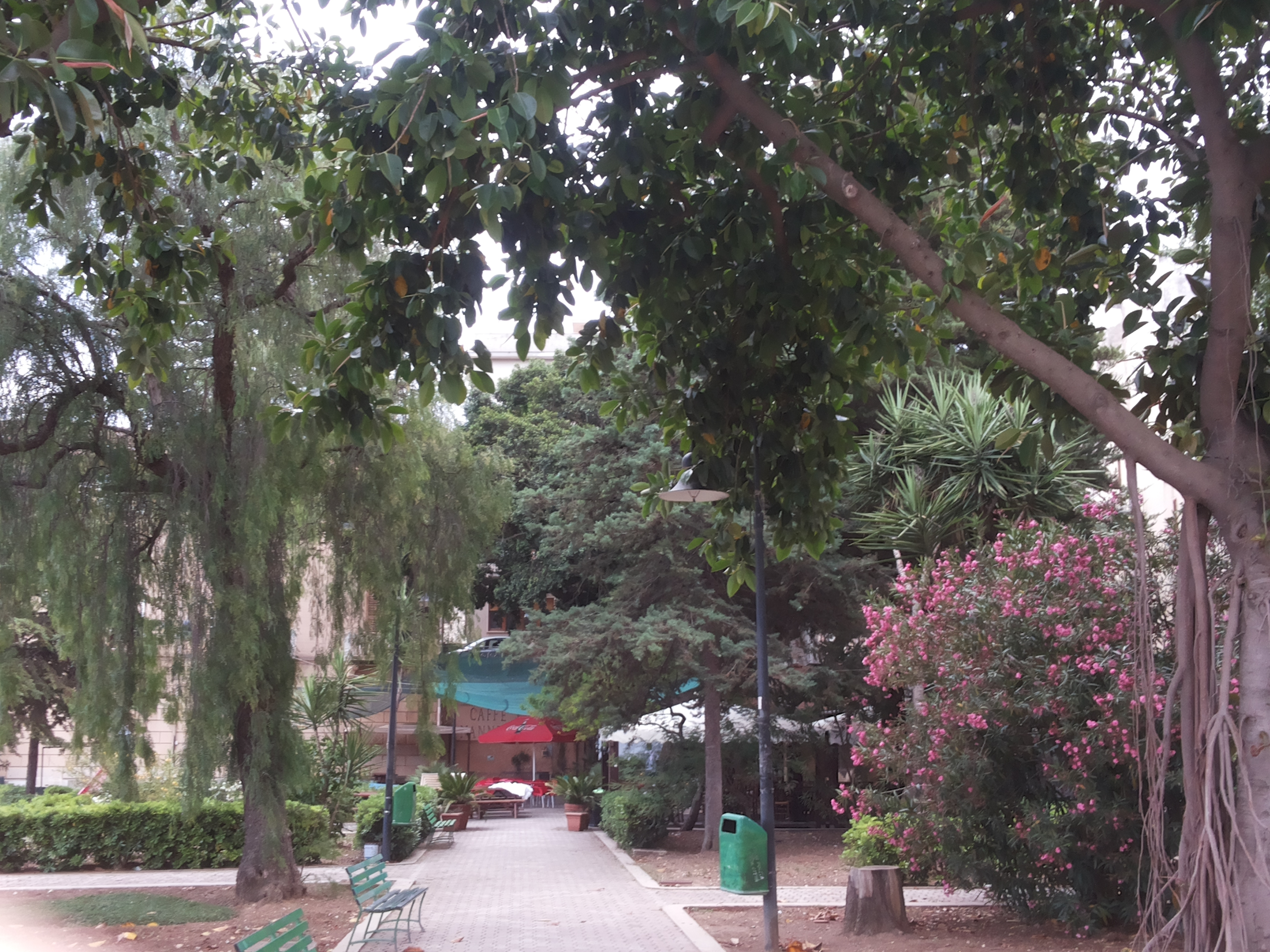
The garden inside Piazza Bagolino

Piazza Bagolino is located on the east side of the town; there is the widest car park: you can leave your car here, either in the square or in the underground car-park that was realized in 2012.

Together with Piazza Ciullo and Piazza della Repubblica, it is one of the largest squares in Alcamo leading into Corso 6 Aprile; here you can admire two magnificent bas-riliefs realized by Nicola Rubino, a sculptor from Alcamo, in 1961 and representing "The poet Cielo d'Alcamo at the court of Frederick II" and "Active life of Alcamo", portrayed through a rural scene with symbolic figures. The work was commissioned to the sculptor by the senator Ludovico Corrao, the Lord Mayor of that time.

On the left of Porta Palermo there is the garden entitled to Bagolino, with some imposing trees; opposite to it there is the entrance of Parco suburbano San Francesco, rich with different plants typical of the Mediterranean flora.

From Piazza Bagolino, also called Belvedere, you can enjoy one of the most picturesque landscapes of the sweet hills of Alcamo countryside, with the geometrical lines drawn by rows of vineyards, olive trees and characteristic baglios in the distance.

The place is not properly enlighted, but actually the strong point is its belvedere: on 21 June, during the feast of Madonna of Miracles (the Patroness of Alcamo), it is the best placet o look at fireworks.

From Piazza Bagolino you can enter Corso 6 Aprile and, in few minutes, reach the town centre on foot.

== Parco suburbano San Francesco ==
This park is a public garden located below the bastion of Piazza Bagolino. It has an area of about 12,000 square metres; it is a wonderful garden with very different types of plants and tree, typical of the Mediterranean macchia.

As soon as you enter it, on the right you can see the tree in memory of the two carabinieris killed on 27 January 1976 in the Alcamo Marina Massacre: Carmine Apuzzo and Salvatore Falcetta.

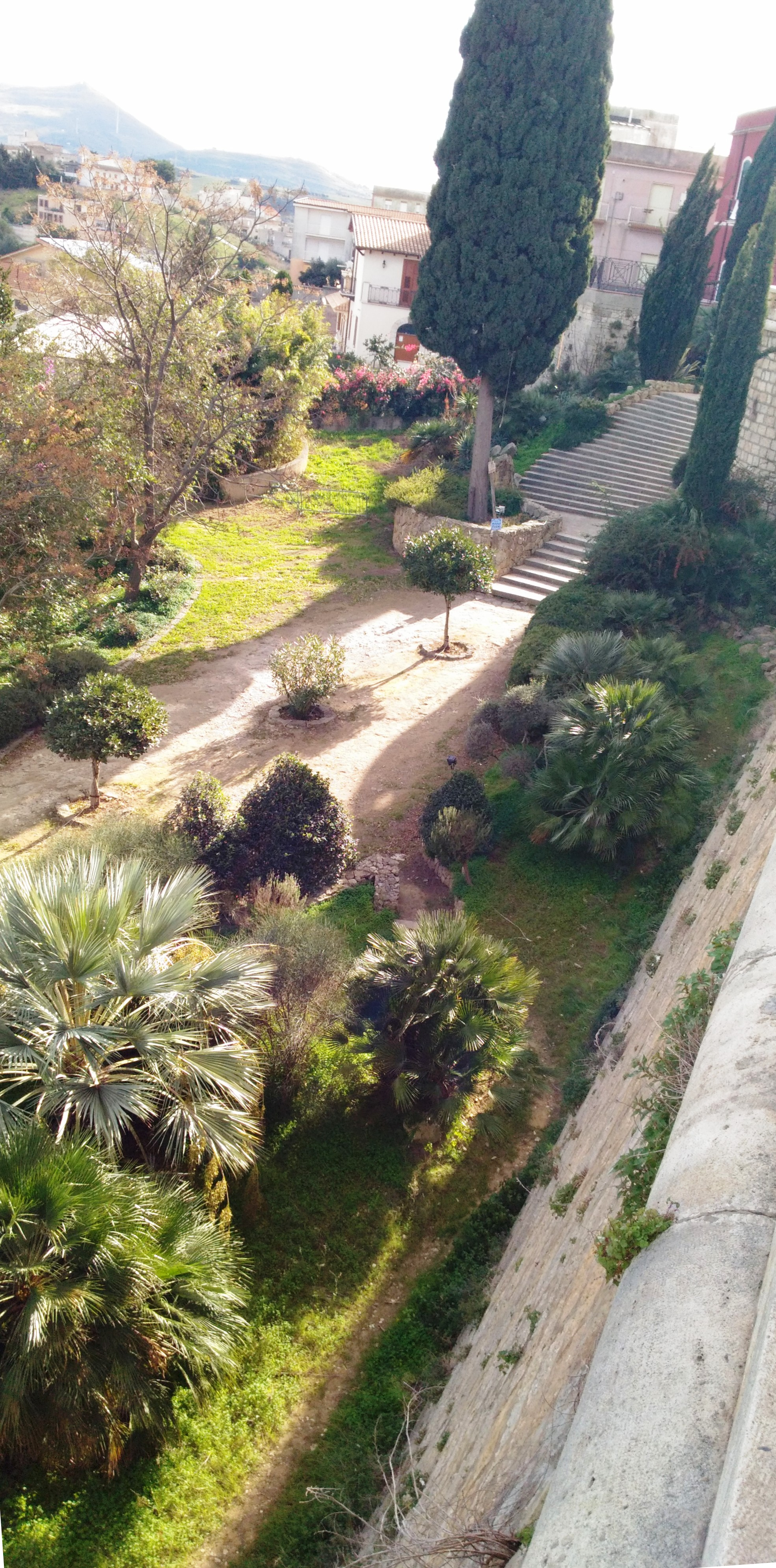
View of the park from Piazza Bagolino

== See also ==
- Piazza Ciullo
- Piazza della Repubblica (Alcamo)
- Sebastiano Bagolino
- Giuseppe Bambina

== Sources ==
- "Piazze principali". Archived from the original on 14 March 2018.
- "Piazza Bagolino".
- Calia, Roberto (1997). I palazzi dell'aristocrazia e della borghesia alcamese. Alcamo: Carrubba.
- De Blasi, Ignazio (1989). Discorso storico della opulenta città di Alcamo situata a piè del Monte Bonifato e dell'antichissima cittù di Longarico; trascrizione del manoscritto originale e realizzazione di Lorenzo Asta. Alcamo.
- Rocca, Pietro Maria (1894). Delle muraglie e porte della città di Alcamo. Palermo: Tipografia Lo Statuto.
- Regina, Vincenzo (1977). Ottocento alcamese: storia e arte; Accademia di studi Cielo D'Alcamo;. Trapani: Cartograf.
