= Parco suburbano San Francesco =

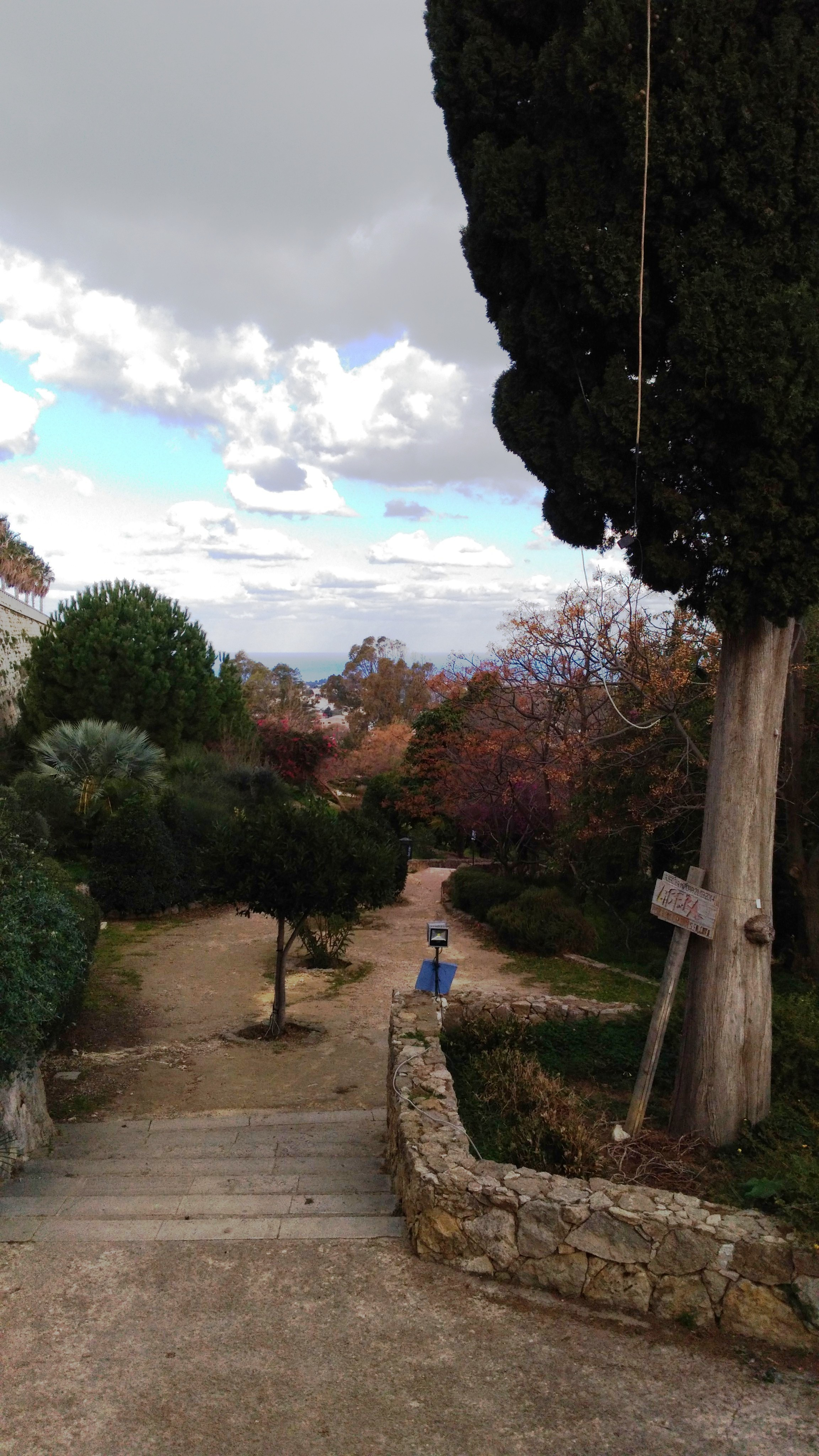
- Entrance of the park
- Interactive map of Parco suburbano San Francesco
- Type: Municipal
- Location: Alcamo
- Coordinates: 37°58′53″N 12°58′11″E
- Area: 1,200 square metres
- Created: 1998
- Status: Open all year

The Parco Suburbano San Francesco (Suburban Park San Francesco) is located below the bastion of Piazza Bagolino, in Alcamo, at the entrance of the town, near Porta Palermo.

== Description ==
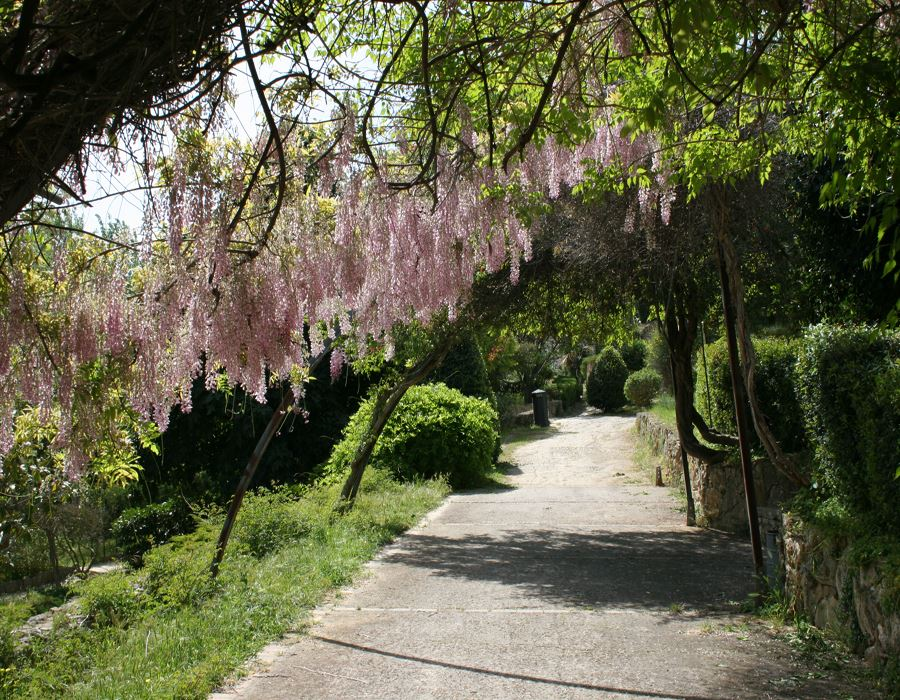
Interior part of the park

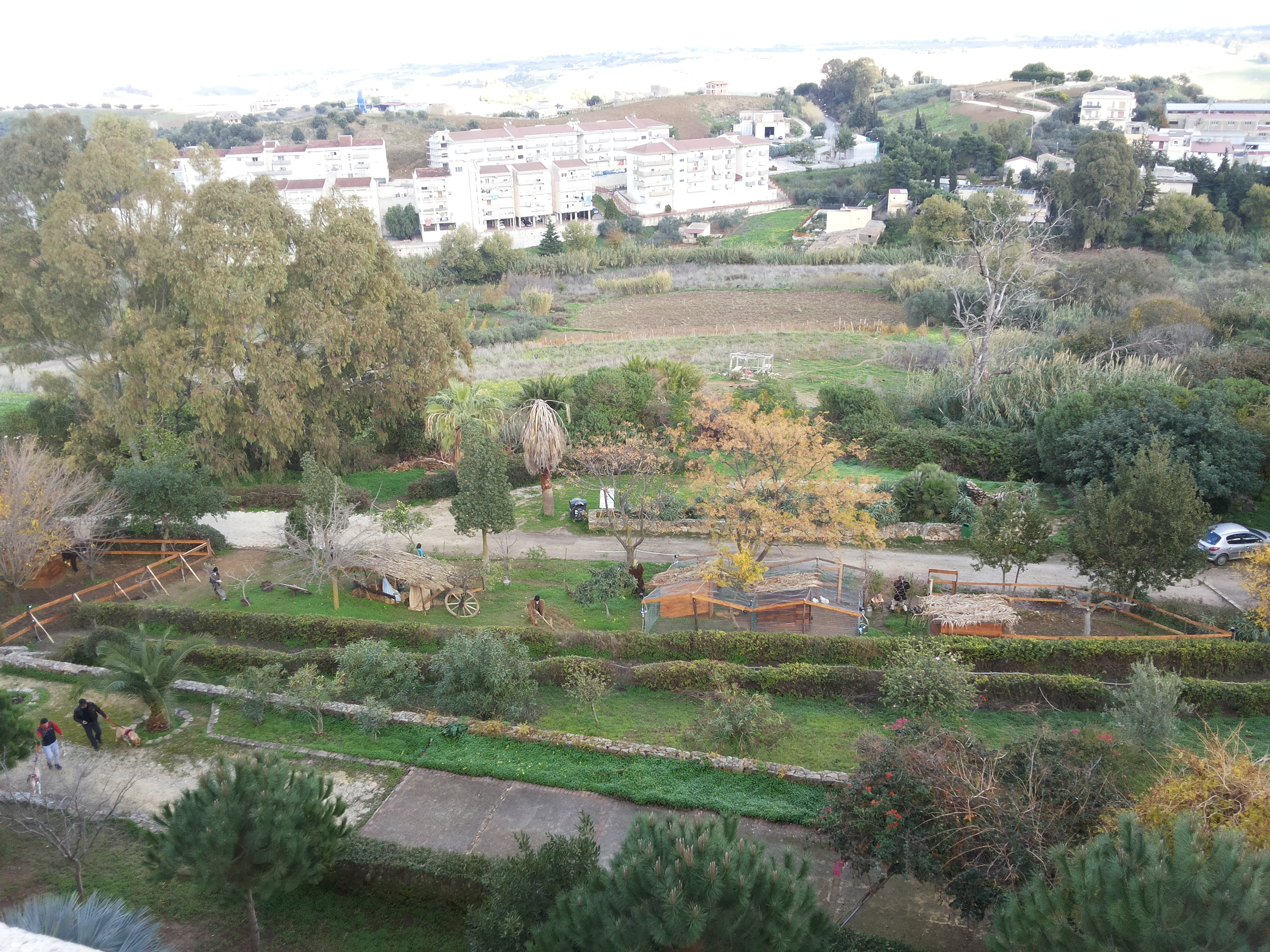
A view of the park from above

This mediterranean garden was created thanks to the approval of the project by the town administration, led by doctor Massimo Ferrara, Lord Mayor from 1993 to 2001.

In the sixties, they had planned the creation of some outdoor sports facilities in this area; at the time Mr. Ludovico Corrao (later Lord Mayor of Alcamo from 1960 to 1962) was the Regional Minister for Public Works under the government of Silvio Milazzo. He got to realize some works in Alcamo, among which the bronze bas-reliefs of Porta Palermo, commissioned to the sculptor Nicola Rubino, representing "The poet Cielo d'Alcamo at Frederick II, Holy Roman Emperor’s court" and "Active life in Alcamo".

The park, with an area of about 12,000 square metres, gardenlike, containing a variety of plants and trees, typical of the flora of macchia mediterranea. Directly to the right of the entrance, there is a memorial tree dedicated to Carmine Apuzzo and Salvatore Falcetta, the two carabiniers killed on 27 January 1977 in the Strage di Alcamo Marina massacre.

On 18 November 2014 the town administration, led by doctor Sebastiano Bonventre, by public invitation, entrusted it to Associazione Laurus, whose President was dottor Gianni Gervasi at that time; its volunteers soon provided to clean it and do the maintenance of the green. Moreover, they realized a playground for children, a little petting zoo and an easy access for disabled people.

== Activity ==
During the school year, they make cultural and gaming activities for children, and various educational workshops for the pupils of primary school.

In August, since 2010, "Alcart - legalità e cultura" organizes some events with different events (exhibitions, seminars, music, theatre etc.).

In April 2016, there was another event called “Festa di Primavera” (Spring Festival): its aim was to let children approach nature; besides taking part in lessons and games, they also saw the planting of some little plants of flowers given by Associazione Laurus itself.

In September 2016, the same association organized the Giornata Nazionale dei Giochi della Gentilezza (the National Day of the Games of Kindness), for kids aged 6–14: the aim of this activity was to reinforce interpersonal skills, accepting and collaborating with other people, and motivating to the use of kind words, being inspired by stories.

Finally, in December, they realized the third edition of the event Natale al Parco (Christmas at the Park), with choruses, exhibitions, parades, Christmas markets and the Living Crib.

== See also ==
- Alcamo
- Riserva naturale Bosco di Alcamo
- Nicola Rubino
- Ludovico Corrao

== Sources ==
- "Parco Sub Urbano San Francesco".
- "Alcamo, dato in gestione il parco suburbano "San Francesco"".
- "ASS. LAURUS ORGANIZZA LABORATORI AL PARCO".
- "il personaggio".
- "ALKART festival 8^ edizione".
- "ALCAMO - FESTA DI PRIMAVERA, 1^ APRILE,".
