= Vito Bongiorno =

Italian artist

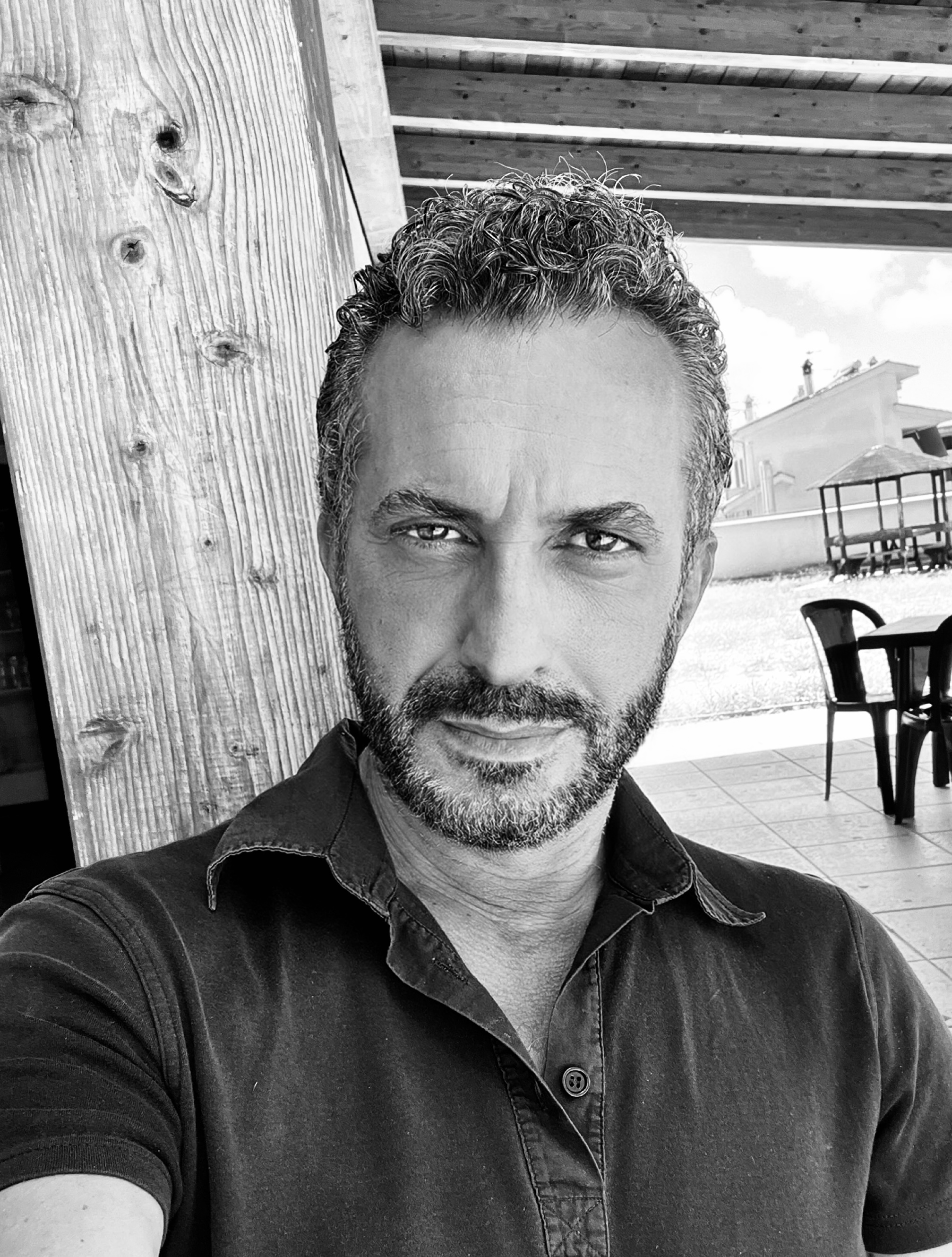
- The artist Vito Bongiorno
- Born: 1 December 1963; Alcamo, Italy
- Known for: painting, sculpture, installation art

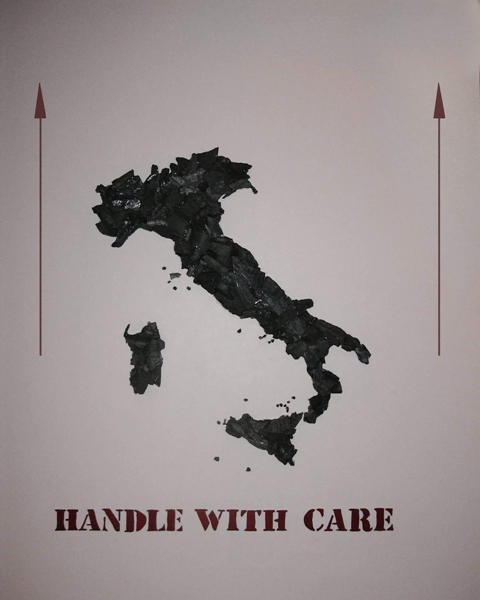
Handle with care (2012)

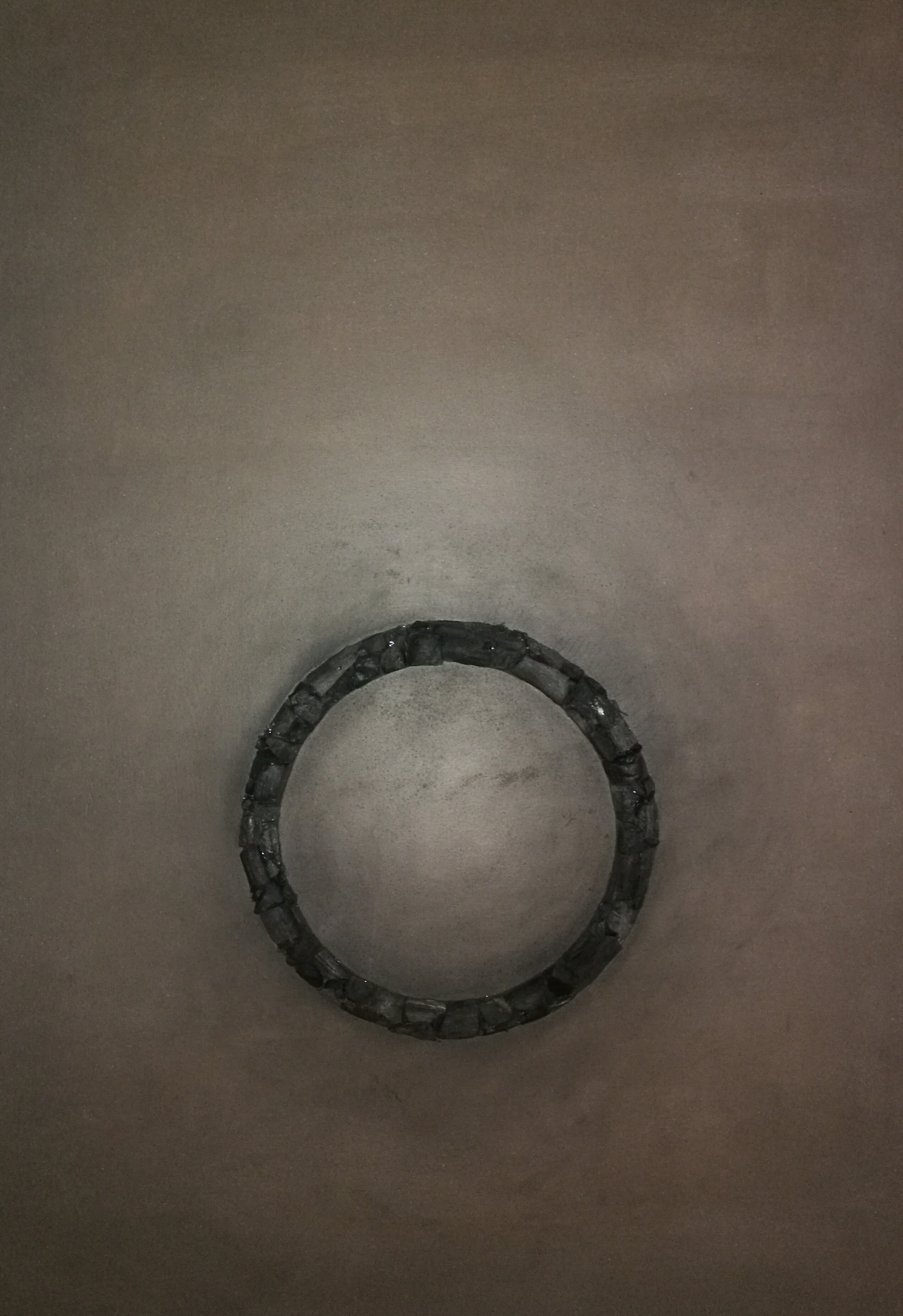
Oltre, by Vito Bongiorno

Vito Bongiorno is an Italian artist known for making art out of charcoal.

== Early life and education ==
Bongiorno was born in Alcamo (in the province of Trapani) in 1963; his childhood was eventful because of the different movings of his family. In fact, after living the terrible experience of the Belice Earthquake in 1968, he moved to Rome when he was only seven. He graduated from art school (at the Liceo Artistico Statale), where he was a pupil of Mino Delle Site, a representative of the movement of Aeropittura. In Rome he also attended some courses of life drawing, engraving and sculpture.

== Activity ==
In order to enlarge his experience, he first moved to Munich, and then to New York City, where he exhibited his works, and got in touch with the most important artists. While realizing his works, Bongiorno considers the human body as a basic element of the artistic expression, and the environment as the scenery of the creative work.

In July 2009, Ludovico Corrao, the former senator and president of the Museo delle Trame Mediterranee of the Foundation Orestiadi di Gibellina, purchased the work Oltremare a Gibellina for this museum. In this painting the sea blue colour should bring a town to be rebuilt, beyond the ruins of the 1968 Belice Earthquake.

During his artistic career, in 2010 the writer Costanzo Costantini labelled Bongiorno as the Italian Yves Klein, referring to his anthropometry, in line with the French painter. The artist has recently denounced the fragility of his country and to express his denunciation he uses coal to symbolise disease, rift, bitterness and pollution.

One of his most recent artistic creations is "Terra Mater" at the Museum of Contemporary Art of Rome, in May 2012. In November 2012 he won the Art & Crisis award organised by the magazine “INSIDEART” with his creation entitled Handle With Care.

In May 2014 he exhibited "Superfetazioni" at the Capitoline Museums in the Centrale Montemartini in Rome. His work "Fragile" was shown at the Maam Museum in Rome. In May 2015 he exhibited a solo show with the provocative title L’Italia brucia (Italy is burning) at the Sant’Andrea Gallery in Rome and then he executed a performance for Exploit in Milan. In the same year he intervened with an installation at the Cà Pesaro Museum in Venice on the occasion of the Venice Biennale.

He is present in the archive of the artists of Rome Quadriennale. Some of his works of art are present in the permanent collection of the Mutuo Soccorso Museum, in the Maam Museum in Rome, and at the MACA in Alcamo. In 2019 he created the work "Our Planet", exhibited at the Macro Museum of Rome; on 12 October he also organized the anthological exhibition entitled Nostos at the Museum of Contemporary Art of Alcamo (MACA) in Alcamo.

Bongiorno lives and works between Fregene and Rome.

== Prizes ==
- November 2012: Prize from the magazine “INSIDEART”, Arte & Crisi, with the work Handle with Care
- February 2013: Premio Adrenalina: winner of the prize from public and prize on line vote (gold categories) with the work It’s not a game, an acrylic on canvas and coal.
- May 2022: Prize Donne in Amore (for the section Entertainment), organized by the Associazione Naschira, partner of the Barrett International Group of Virginia Barrett, Nathaly Caldonazzo and Vito Bongiorno have been awarded for the pictorial project “Squartalized”, which represents the states of mind and the wounds of the people who have suffered physical and psychological violence.

== Recent exhibitions ==
- Museo Macro la Pelanda in Rome: presented the work Terra mater, during the fair Roma contemporary and in collaboration with Inside Art (May 2012)
- Ancona, Museo della Mole Vanvitelliana, with a performance dedicated to the artist Gino De Dominicis, (2012)
- Fiumicino: he exhibits for Manualmente at Villa Guglielmi, (2013)
- Rome, Galleria Opera Unica, "Sinite parvulos venire ad me", April 2013
- Accademia di Romania, for the exhibition Osmosi, and at galleria Visiva for the show Censured: he takes part with one of his works
- Rome, Musei Capitolini at Centrale Montemartini, with Superfetazioni; May 2014
- Biennale of Viterbo, 2014
- Triennale of Rome, presented by Achille Bonito Oliva, 2014
- Naples, his performance Terra Mater opens the Naf-Napoli Arte Fiera, 2015
- Rome, Galleria Sant’Andrea, a solo show entitled L’Italia brucia (Italy is burning), May 2015
- Venice Biennale, Museo Ca' Pesaro, 2015
- Viterbo, Galleria Miralli, a solo show entitled aureAttesa, April 2016
- Roma, Galleria Consorti at via Margutta, Black holes, June 2016
- Assisi, Minigallery, Black holes, June 2016
- Milan, takes part in the Affordable Art Fair, January 2017
- Rome, Galleria Minima Arte Contemporanea, solo show entitled "Anime", July 2017
- Rome, Galleria Fidia, solo show entitled Metamorfosi Materiche, February 2018
- Rome, Museo d'Arte Contemporanea (MACRO) of Rome, February 2019

== See also ==
- Gino Patti
- Turi Simeti
- Aeropittura
- Body Art
- Land art
