= Museum of Contemporary Art of Alcamo =

Museum in Piazza Ciullo, Alcamo, Italy

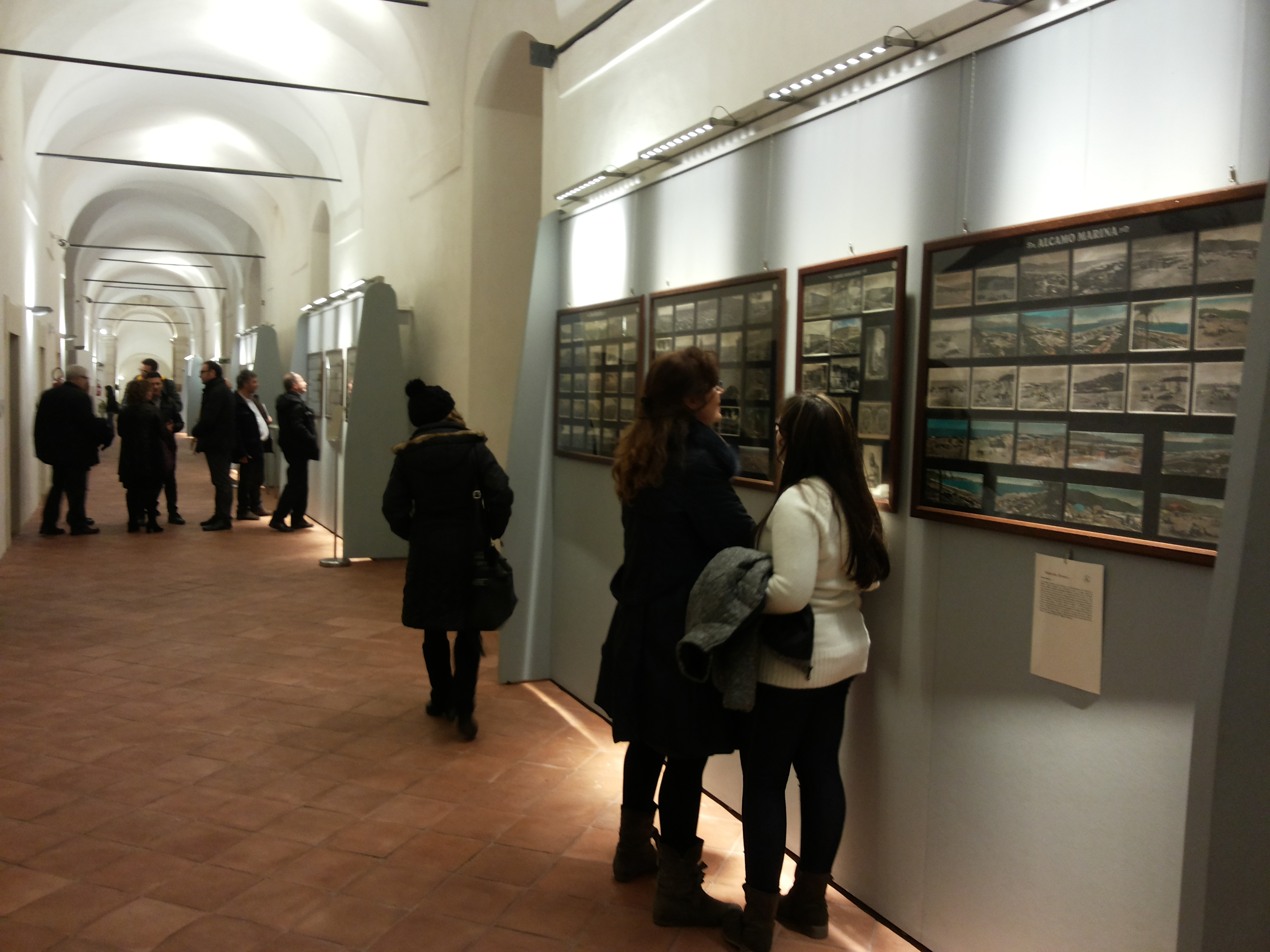
- Established: 2014
- Location: Piazza Ciullo, Alcamo
- Coordinates: 37°58′47″N 12°57′54″E
- Website: http://www.comune.alcamo.tp.it/

The Museum of contemporary art of Alcamo is located in Piazza Ciullo in Alcamo, inside the Ex Collegio dei Gesuiti, near the majestic Church of Jesus. The exhibition centre, large about 400 square metres, is on the first floor; at the entrance there are an information desk, a meeting room (the old chapel of Jesuits) and a bookshop.

== History ==
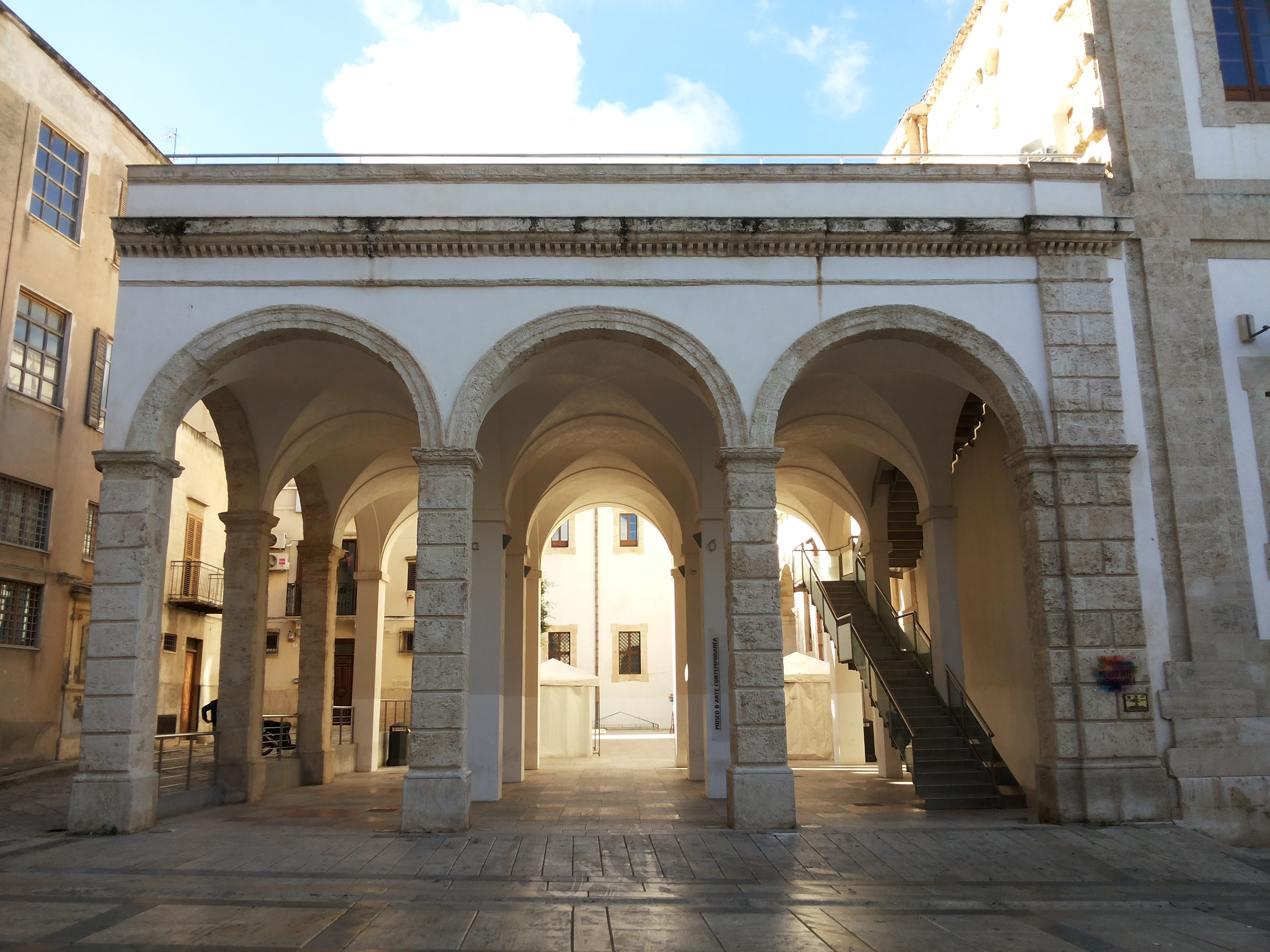
Arcade of the Ex Collegio dei Gesuiti

The museum was created in 2014 thanks to the municipal administration led by the Lord Mayor of that period, Dr. Sebastiano Bonventre M.D. In the following October they realized the ambitious project Creative Lab, an integrated system of cultural services aiming at the requalification of the urban space and supporting the development of the territory; the municipality of Alcamo, the University of Palermo and the cooperatives Agrigest and Nido d’Argento.

On 28 February 2015, there was the exhibition entitled Art on loan, whose protagonists were Cielo d'Alcamo, Giacomo Serpotta and embroidery; the exposition, attended by the artistic director Enzo Fiammetta, has filled the new museum with works from important museums, such as the Foundation Orestiadi di Gibellina, and from other Italian regions.

On 30 May 2015, the new museum presented the exhibition Ottocelle (that is Eight Cells): the title took inspiration from the same configuration of the rooms which were the cells of the ex convent of Jesuits. There were the works of four Italian artists (Elisa Nicolaci, Francesco De Grandi, Sergio Zavattieri and Luisa Mazza), the winners of the competition launched by the municipality of Alcamo, whose aim was the promotion of its territory through the production of works site specific that today belong to the patrimony of the museum.

In October 2016 they created a new arrangement of the museum that has also taken part in the XII Edition of the Contemporary's Day called by AMACI (Association of the Museums of Italian Contemporary Art).

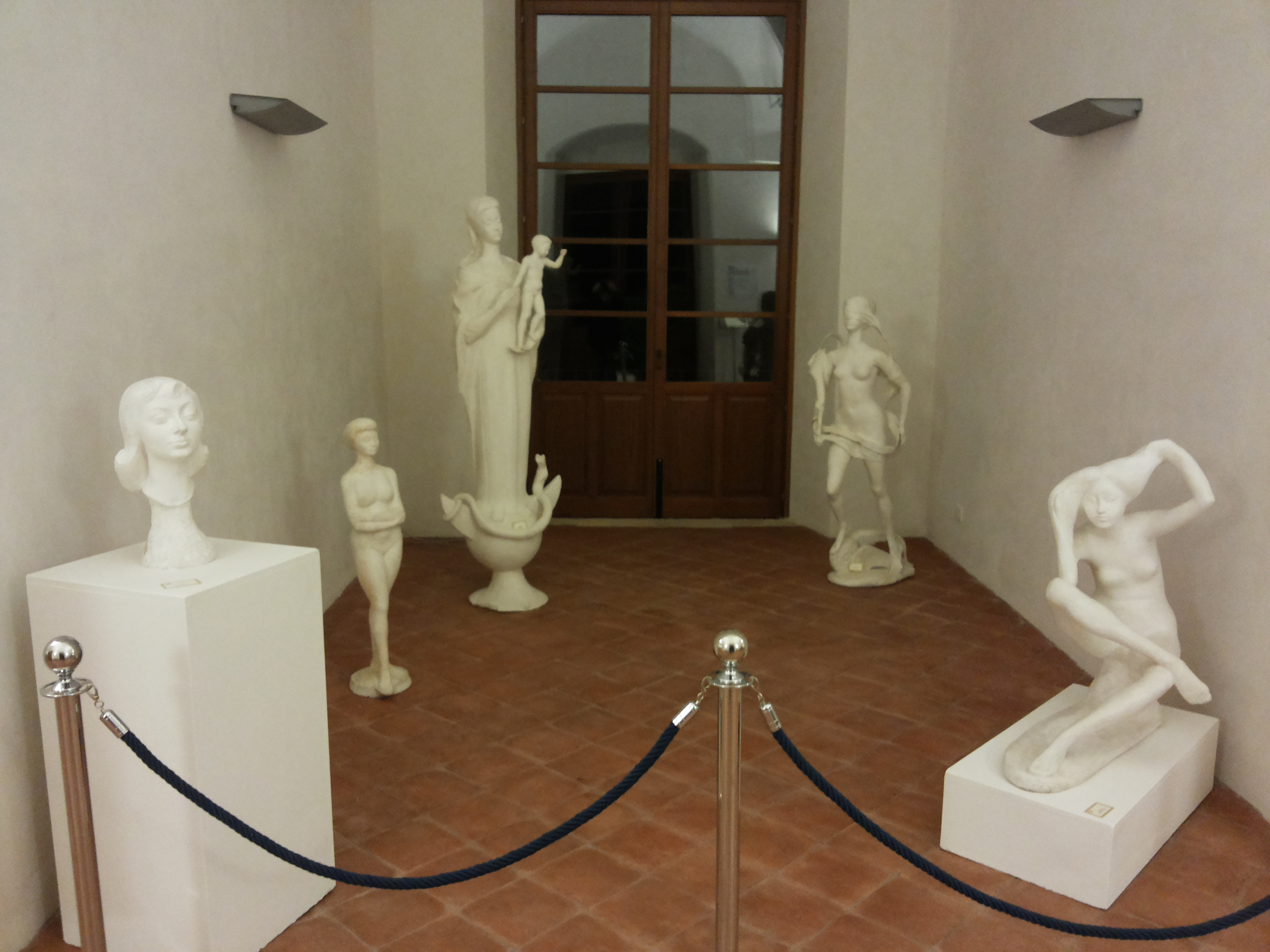
Sculptures (plaster casts) made by Nicola Rubino

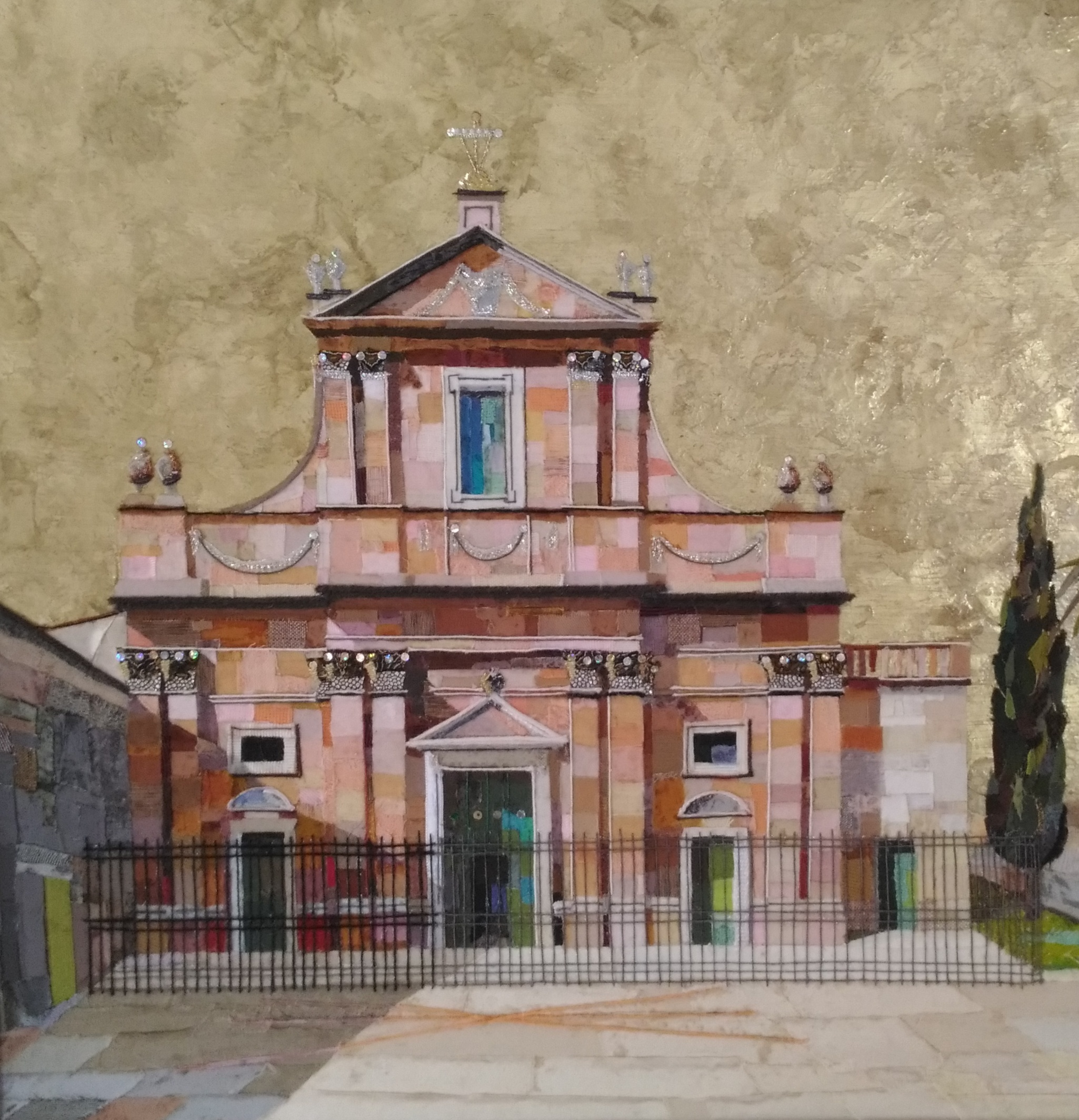
Chiesa Madre:a painting made with silk intarsias by Gisella Giovenco

== Exhibition halls ==
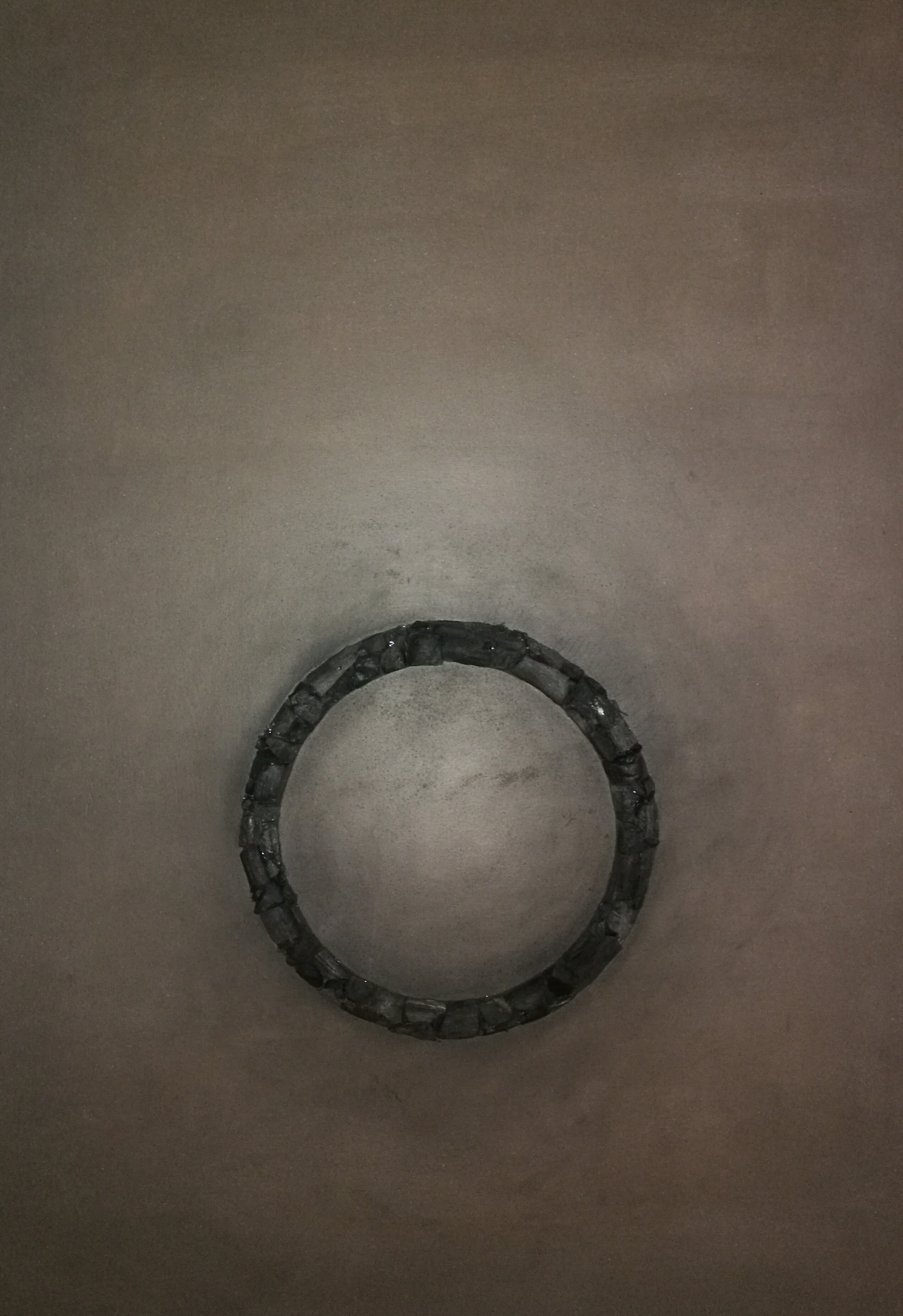
Oltre by Vito Bongiorno, realized with charcoal and ash

The museum is divided into various sections: the archaeological funds discovered on Mount Bonifato and in the Castle of Calatubo, the paintings of Turi Simeti, Vito Bongiorno, Gisella Giovenco and Sergio Zavattieri, going right down to the plaster casts of Nicola Rubino, and works of other authors.

=== East wing ===
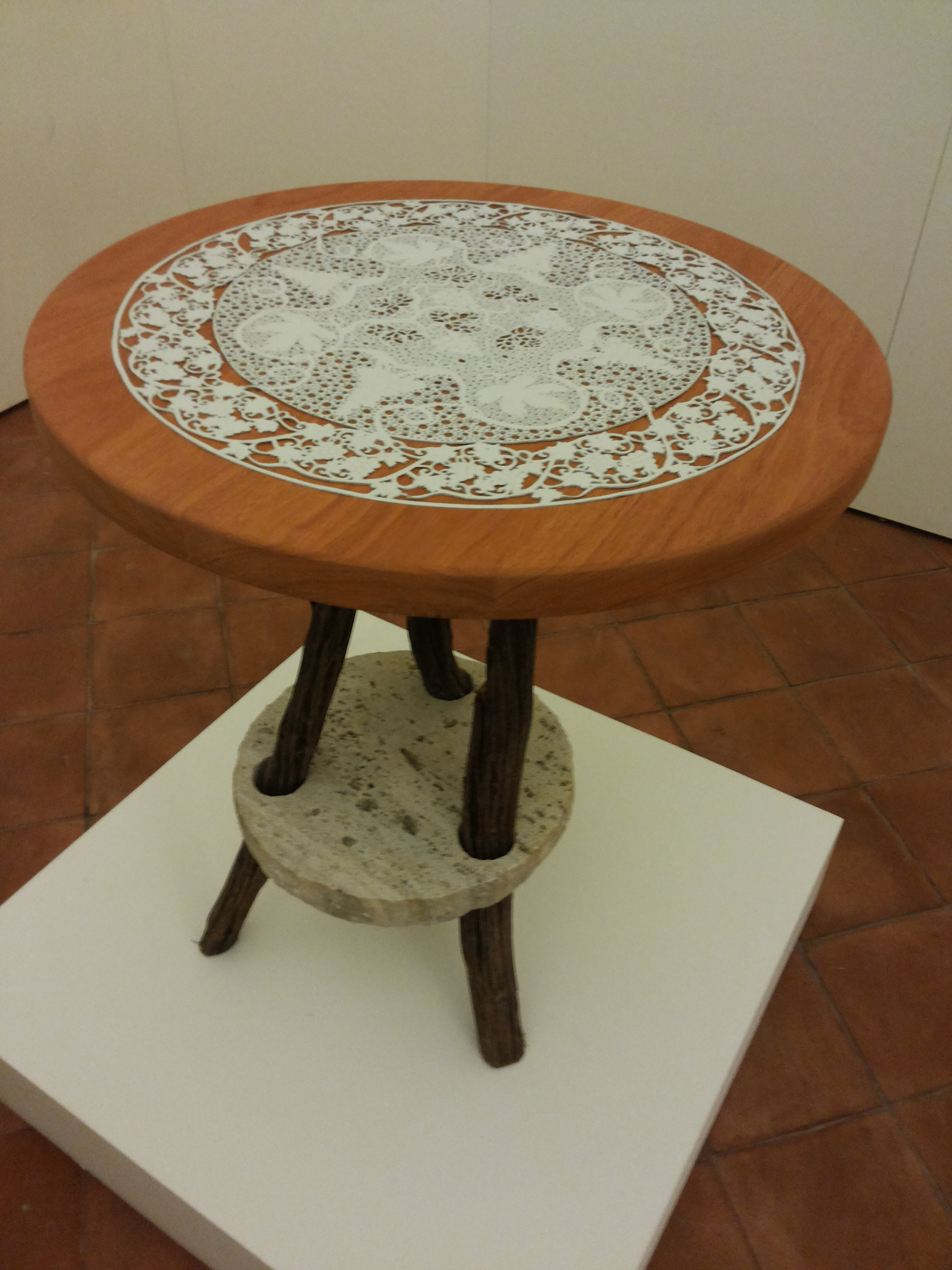
Untitled (the table telling about Alcamo, 2015)

There are these 8 exhibition halls:

- Cell I: four paintings (protrusions) by Turi Simeti, an exponent of spatialism, coming from Alcamo and living in Milan
- Cell II: Our Planet, Linea d’Ombra and Oltre; three paintings by Vito Bongiorno, an artist from Alcamo living and working in Rome
- Cell III: Loredana Mannina, Untitled (the table telling about Alcamo, 2015).
- Cell IV: Elisa Nicolaci, Single. A creative adaptation (the part where the belly sleeps), 2015.
- Rosario Bruno: Fragments of the Renaissance memory a tribute to Botticelli (1985-1994): a bas-relief
- Luisa Mazza: Immagini di luce (images of light), 2015; a work made up of different modules, the transparent cases keep “jewels of light”. It was dedicated to Alcamo, a town rich in history, sea and light, proud also of being the birthplace of Cielo d'Alcamo, a very important reference for the Poetry of every period.
- Cell V: Sergio Zavattieri: Pictures from Alcamo (2015), 33 stereoscopies which let you live an imaginary journey into the past.
- Cell VI: Francesco Surdi Something from 2015, plaster cast and other materials: in search of fragments of reality.
- Cell VII: Roberto Romano, Sedimenta (2015)
- Cell VIII: Francesco De Grandi, I cartelli, 2015 (A Tribute to Don Gaspano Canino, a puppet master from Alcamo)

Along the corridor there are the following works:

- Two paintings by Sergio Zavattieri: Hemerocallis (2006) and Lilium candidum (2006), watercolours.
- Two works by Francesco Fontana: Vie geometriche a colore (2015), oil and temperas on canvas.
- Two embroidered creations, made by skillful local embroiderers

=== South wing ===
There are these eight exhibition halls:

- Archaeological finds: first and second room.
- Scientific instrumentations: third room
- Nicola Rubino, plaster cast sculptures: fourth and fifth room
- Gisella Giovenco: seven paintings realized with silk intarsias and representing some churches in Alcamo; last room on the right.

Here is the list of Nicola Rubino's works in exhibition:

1. Egyptian (of the Pharaoh) bather
2. Woman with a dove, realized in bronze
3. Mater Ecclesiae: made in bronze for the nunnery located in Via Vitellia in Rome
4. Bas-relief, openwork (cm.82x73)
5. Woman combing herself (cm.82x73)
6. Girl combing herself
7. Victor Emmanuel III’s head, made in bronze for the Gallery Umberto I in Rome
8. Bandaged goddess
9. Man bent over the dog
10. Woman holding a lamb on her arms
11. Couple of horses, realized in terracotta for the municipality of Venice
12. Woman combing herself
13. Woman with a child on her shoulders
14. Stele
15. High relief, openwork (cm.36x38)
16. High relief, openwork (cm.36x38)
17. Mother with a child on her shoulders, realized in bronze
18. Bas-relief, with scenes of rural life
19. Justice, a bronze, realized for the courthouse of Bologna
20. Woman's head
21. Woman combing herself
22. Sculpted group with a winged horse
23. Bas-relief, openwork
24. Bas-relief (realized in bronze)
25. Woman's face (a figure)

The museum is open every day (Sundays included) from 9:30 to 12:30 and from 16:30 to 19:30.

== Sources ==
- http://www.alpauno.com/alcamo-nasce-il-museo-darte-contemporanea/#.V9bCAq2s9Z8
- http://www.alqamah.it/2014/07/25/nasce-il-museo-darte-contemporanea-ad-alcamo-ieri-linaugurazione/
- http://ilgiornaledellarte.com/articoli/2015/3/123505.html
- http://www.eventiculturalisicilia.it/index.php?cat=3&id=671
- http://www.exibart.com/notizia.asp?IDNotizia=45170&IDCategoria=79
- https://web.archive.org/web/20161221003543/http://www.cosedafareinsicilia.it/sito/2015/02/27/museo-darte-contemporanea-sinaugura-ad-alcamo-il-28-febbraio-ecco-i-contenuti/
- http://livesicilia.it/2015/02/27/riapre-il-collegio-dei-gesuiti-inaugura-art-on-loan_601503/
- http://www.alqamah.it/2015/02/25/da-ciullo-dalcamo-a-turi-simeti-con-art-on-loan-sabato-grand-opening-del-museo-darte-contemporanea-di-alcamo/
- http://www.tp24.it/2016/10/08/istituzioni/alcamo-il-15-ottobre-apre-il-nuovo-museo-di-arte-contemporanea/103708
