= Nicola Rubino =

Italian sculptor and painter (1905–1984)

Nicola Rubino (3 April 1905 – 25 February 1984) was an Italian sculptor and painter.

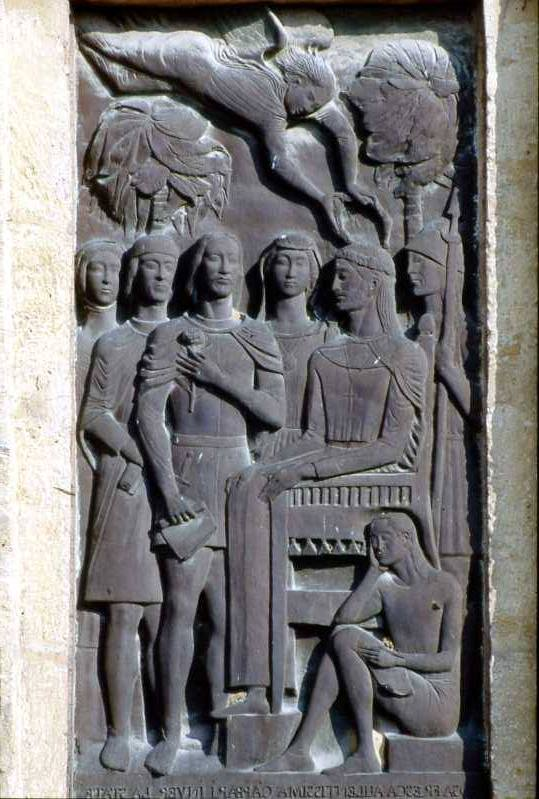
Cielo d'Alcamo at the court of Frederick II

== Biography ==
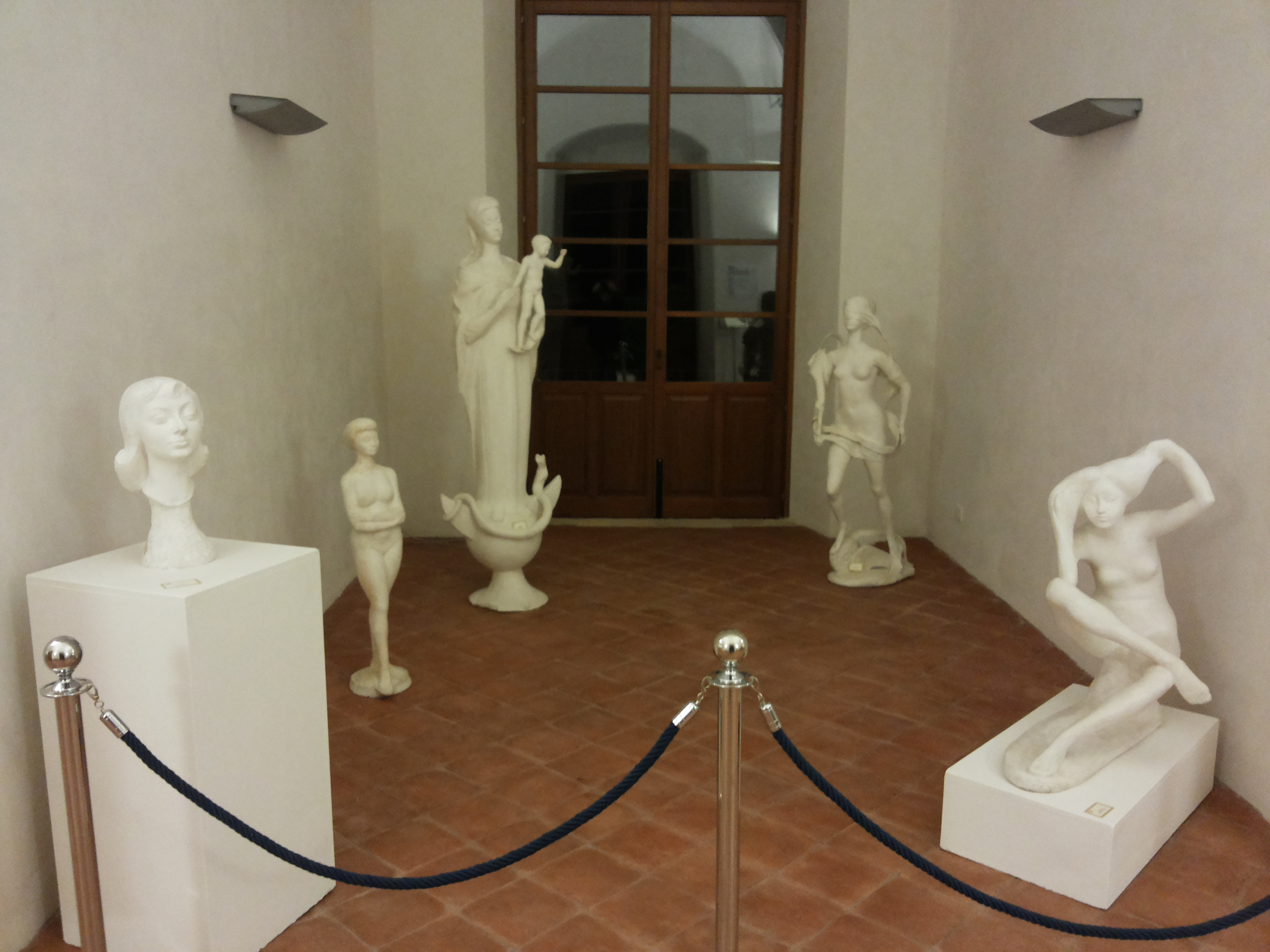
Sculpture (plasters) by Nicola Rubino

He was the son of Francesco and Caterina Cudia and attended the Classical Lyceum in his native Alcamo. In 1925, aged only 20, he moved to Rome to study at Accademia di Belle Arti together with different artists of Scuola romana like Mafai, Omiccioli, Fazzini and Gentilizi; in Rome he had a close friendship with artists and intellectuals like Sarra, Guttuso and Fellini.

Nicola Rubino was an exponent of the artistic cultural current called "Scuola romana" and of the international sculpture of the 20th century. His works, besides being present in various Italian cities, are exhibited in museums and private collections in Italy and abroad; a valuable collection is kept and exhibited at the Museum of Contemporary Art of Alcamo, inside the l'ex Collegio dei Gesuiti.

His very rich artistic production, from the second half of the 1920s to the beginning of the 1980s, was created inside his studio in via Margutta. He liked female figures, that also come back in his paintings realized by Rubino in the last period of his activity, in which he uses a symbolical natural style.

In 1942 he took part in the fourth Rome Quadriennale and in 1948 in the Rassegna d'arte figurativa (Exposition of figurative art) of Rome. In 1952 he took part in the fifth Rome Quadriennale and in the XXVI Venice Biennale and his works were then exhibited in foreign countries, among which there were Greece, Turkey and Egypt.

Between 1953 and 1959 he participated at the Mostra d'arte del Mezzogiorno (Southern Italy Art Exhibition) of Rome (1953), Naples (1953 and 1954) where he is assigned the prize Salvator Rosa, and then at the International Medal Exhibition (Palazzo Venezia in Rome). In 1953 they assigned him one of the ten prizes at the contest for the monument to the Unknown Political Prisoner. He took part in the Venice Biennale in 1954 and he set up a retrospective of medals and exhibited four works at the Rome Quadriennale.

He also works for private customers (Targioni, Fusi, Lombardo from Rome), and as a teacher at Scuole Media (first-grade secondary school) and Liceo artistico in Rome.

In 1956 the Ministry of Transport commissioned him the portal, in Istrian stone, for the Venezia Santa Lucia railway station. In this bas-Relief, six metres high and five large, Rubino has represented instraight lines, the history of Venice through the most important events: the discovery of Saint Mark's corpse, the Republic of Venice, the conquest of Costantinople, the Battle of Lepanto and the Crusades. In 1958 Rubino participated in the Premio Internazionale Città di Carrara and, in 1959, at the International Medal Exhibition at the Mint of Bruxelles.

In the same year he won a contest proclaimed by the Province of Rome and realized a bronze bas-relief for the Technical School "Maffeo Pantaleoni" of Rome.

In 1961 he made the bronze bas-reliefs for the 18th century Porta Palermo (a Gate) in Alcamo, which were commissioned him by the former Lord Mayor Ludovico Corrao and representing "The poet Cielo d'Alcamo at the court of Federico II" and "Active life of Alcamo".

In 1963 he took part in the Exposition of Figurative Arts of Rome and Lazio and, with two of his works, at the Contest Exhibition of Figurative Arts of INPS (National Social Insurance Agency); besides he realized fifteen medals that he showed at the "International Exhibition of contemporary religious medal" (Palazzo Braschi in Rome) and five medals at the "Exposicion de la medalla actual" of Madrid (1964).

Between 1964 and 1973 Rubino won 5 competitions and realized the bronze and marble bas-reliefs for the buildings of Lecce, Campobasso, EUR, Rome, Syracuse and Cuneo. The bas-relief at the Inps of Rome represents an idealized vision of work: you can see rural and handcraft life, with a proletarian family in the middle: Rubino wants to intend work as unity and social redemption of it.

In 1965 he participated, with 5 works, at the IX Rome Quadriennale and exhibited in Paris, nine medals at the Exposition "La medalle italienne à la Monnale de Paris". Two years later he presented nine medals at the Exhibition of French, Italian and Spanish Medal (Palazzo Braschi) in Rome.

Then his works were exhibited in Rome in 1972, as a retrospective at the gallery Il Camino, and in 1973 at the Club Internazionale dell'Antiquariato (Antiques). In 1977 Nicola Rubino showed his pictures, in his first painting retrospective, at the Gallery "San Marco" of Rome.

After his death in Rome, his wife and two children ordered that some of his works were donated to the municipality of Alcamo, with the obligation of allocating them in the museum inside the Castle of the Counts of Modica; as a whole, la collezione è composta, oltre a 10 tele, di 27 opere, tra gessi e bronzi, the collection is made up, apart 10 paintings, of 27 works (bronzes and plasters) created between the 1950s and 1960s, and testify how Nicola Rubino always tried the naturalness of shape, of movement: the Dancer, the Woman combing herself, the Pharaoh's bather, the Mother with a child are some examples of this.

There are also the allegorical figures: Justice (bronze bas-relief openwork), Lady Luck, Woman with a dove (plasters), The winged horse (a bronze), and finally, the religious themes, like Mater Ecclesiae (plaster) and the Stations of the Cross with four figures (bronze bas-relief).

In 1999 they entitled the Exhibition Room of Centro Congressi Marconi of Alcamo to Nicola Rubino, and on 20 April 2007 they inaugurated the plaster casts gallery, dedicated to the sculptor, inside the Castle of the Counts of Modica di Alcamo, later moved to the Museum of Contemporary Art of Alcamo at the ex Collegio dei Gesuiti.

=== Rubino's sculpture and painting ===
His works are characterized by an elegant and linear style; Rubino, in the realization of his sculptures, utilized different materials: plaster, bronze, marble or clay that he was able to model in an admirable way, giving shape to figures which recall the classical world and above all, the Hellenic one. As the scholar Gioacchino Aldo Ruggieri affirms, Nicola Rubino can be defined a neoclassical artist because his vision of art is a search for an accomplished beauty, like the one expressed by Canova or Foscolo.

There is a tight correlation between his sculpture and his painting: according to Franco Miele, Rubino reveals the same ability in modelling a statue or using colour; he is able to express everything with a linear simplicity in both things. His works are exhibited in some galleries (Galleria d'Arte Moderna in Rome, Museo di Roma etc.), and in several private collections.

== Works ==
- Atleta e gruppo Fontana dei Centauri, Foro Italico in Rome, 1940, marble
- Madonna dell'Assunta, Cathedral of Messina, 1947, marmble statue
- Via Crucis, Cathedral of Pantelleria, 1952, bronze
- Acrobati, a bronze group, Naples
- Madonna, Chiesa di Santa Chiara in Rome, 1955, bronze
- Portal of stazione di Santa Lucia di Venezia, 1956, Istrian stone
- 7 Stations of the Cross, Chiesa di Santa Maria della Mercede in Rome, 1957, bronze
- La Crocifissione, station of, Chiesa parrocchiale di Avilla di Buia (Udine), 1959
- Bronze bas-relief, Istituto Tecnico "Maffeo Pantaleoni" of Rome, 1959
- Panel and ceramics tiles to be attached to the buildings of INA-CASA, 1959
- Cielo d'Alcamo alla corte di Federico II, bas-relief, Porta Palermo of Alcamo, 1961, bronze
- Vita attiva della città di Alcamo, bronze bas-relief, Porta Palermo in Alcamo, 1961
- Cristo Lavoratore, Cittadella Cristiana di Assisi, 1961, bronze bas-relief
- Battesimo di Gesù, Fonte battesimale, Chiesa di S. Gregorio VII in Roma, 1962, bas-relief
- bas-relief, INPS building of Lecce, 1964, marble
- bas-relief, INPS building of Campobasso, 1964, marble
- bas-relief, INPS building Rome EUR, 1969, marble
- bas-relief, INPS building of Syracuse, 1970, bronze
- bas-relief, INPS building of Cuneo, 1973, bronze

Some of his works, realized between the 1950s and 1960s, are exhibited in the plaster cast gallery at the ex Collegio dei Gesuiti in Alcamo; these are the most important:

Dancer, marble

- Woman combing herself, marble
- Pharao's bather, marble
- Mother with child, marble
- Justice, bronze bas-relief, openwork
- Lady Luck, plaster
- Woman with a dove, plaster
- The winged horse, bronze
- Mater Ecclesiae, plaster
- Stations of the Cross with four figures, bronze bas-relief
- Statue with a winged horse, bronze
- Rural and pastoral life, bronze bas-relief, openwork

== Recognitions ==
- 1952: a prize at the Exhibition of Frosinone and a bronze plaque as the winner of a contest proclaimed by Italcable
- 1953: prize in the competition for the Monument to the Unknown Political Prisoner
- 1954: prize Salvator Rosa, Naples
- 1957: important appreciation at Premio Avezzano
- 1959: important appreciation at the Exhibition of Figurative Arts of Rome and Lazio
- 1968: gold metal at the Exhibition of the artists' trade union of Turin
- 1968: silver tablet and a cup at the Sculpture Exposition at the Casale dell'Arte di Ladispoli

== See also ==
- Pietro Montana
- Gino Patti
- Alcamo

== Sources ==
- http://www.nicolarubinoscultore.it|Sito dedicated to the sculptor
- Nicola Rubino, Catalogo delle opere a cura di Ernesto Di Lorenzo, Alcamo, promoted by Rotary club of Alcamo, Arti Grafiche Campo, 2008
- G. Falossi: Enciclopedia dei pittori e degli scultori italiani del Novecento, vol. II, Milano, ed. Electa, 1991
- A.A.V.V.: Nicola Rubino, Roma, tip.Eurosia
