= Piazza della Repubblica, Alcamo =

Coordinates: 37.978726°N 12.967449°E

Piazza della Repubblica
- {{{other_names}}}
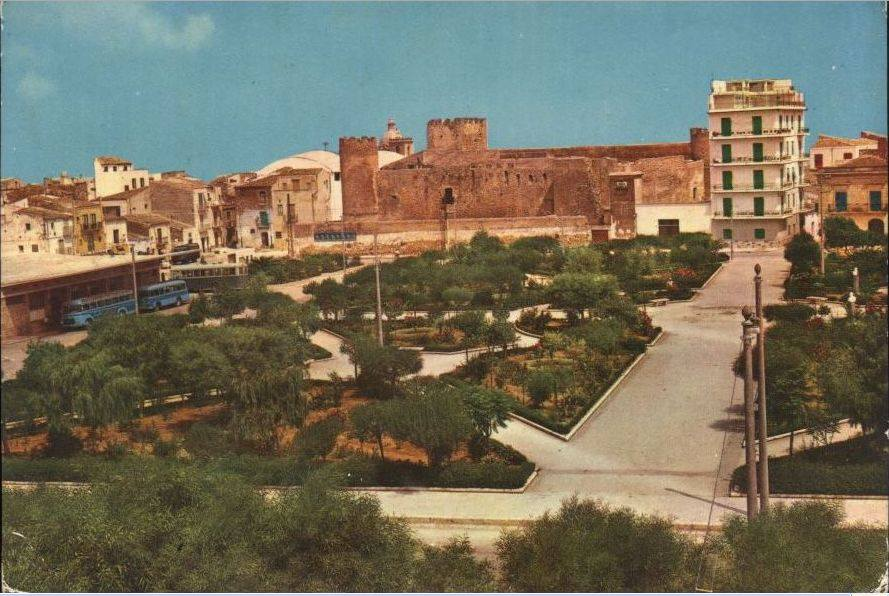
- Features: Castle of the Counts of Modica; Civic Theatre "Cielo d'Alcamo"; Church of the Most Holy Trinity, Alcamo
- Opened: 1400
- Surface: asphalt
- Location: Alcamo, Italy
- Interactive map of Piazza della Repubblica
- Coordinates

Piazza della Repubblica is the largest square in Alcamo, a town in the province of Trapani. It is located in the town centre.

== History ==
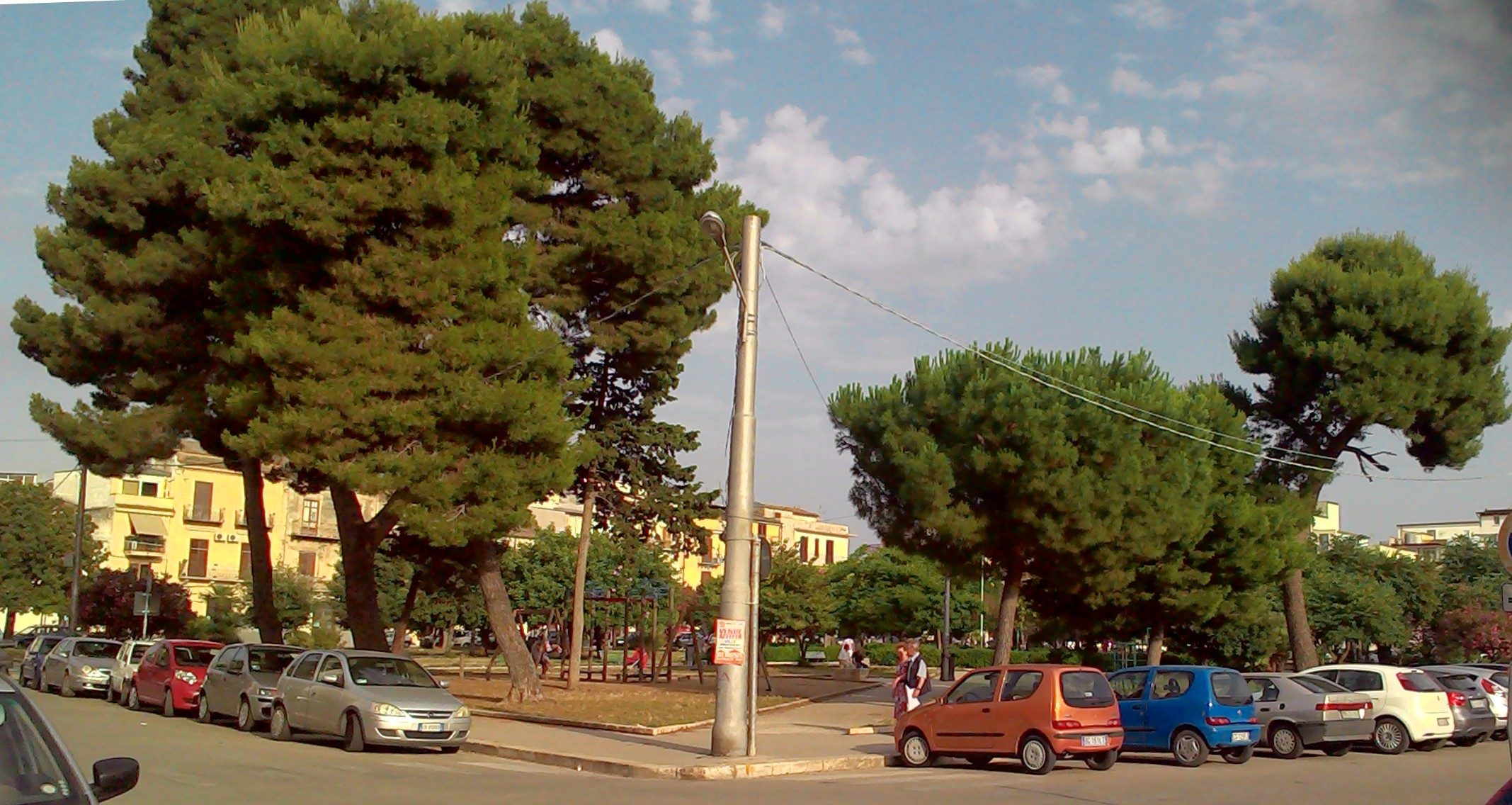
The square seen from the north

Its origin dates back to the middle of the 14th century: at first it was used as a place-of-arms for military exercise. The only building existing at that time was the Church of Saint Mary of Jesus and its convent of the Order of Friars Minor south of it, while, on the sides of the square there were just some small rural buildings.

In the early 19th century, the castle was given to the municipality by the last Counts of Modica, and the square was not used for its primary scope any longer. Later, the town municipality placed an abreuvoir in this square and, another one in Piano Santa Maria. It was first called Piazza del Progresso, as it was in the middle of a rapidly expanding area.

In 1903, after the anarchic bombing which caused Umberto I's death, it was named for him, but in 1946, with the arrival of Italian Republic, it was given the present name. From 1922 to 1946 the square was used as a football ground, as it was the only large area available for this activity.

In the 1960s it was asphalted, and they built the bus station with two platforms; they also settled the garden, by realizing some flowerbeds, planting some trees and flowers and placing benches. In the first Garibaldian centennial (1860) they had put two marble busts representing the two Triolo brothers (Stefano and Giuseppe Triolo), who took part in the revolts and in Giuseppe Garibaldi's deed: these works, realized by Giuseppe Bambina (a sculptor from Alcamo), were then removed because of the continuous acts of vandalism, and at present (May 2018) they are placed at the entrance of the Castello dei conti di Modica.

=== Description ===
Piazza della Repubblica has a square shape: the north side is predominated by the profile of the Castle, while all the remaining part is occupied by houses, shops and offices. Inside the public garden, located in the middle of the square, there are some footpaths leading to a central open space, where they had to place a fountain; on the west side of the garden there is the bus station, recently restored (January–May 2018).

Around the garden there are the arterial roads which let car traffic flow towards Piazza Bagolino and Viale Europa (through Via Maria Riposo, where you can admire the Church of Saint Mary of Jesus. If you go down via Mazzini, you will get to Piazza Ciullo and then to the town centre . The Civic Theatre "Cielo d'Alcamo" is located opposite the main entrance of the castle.

== See also ==
- Piazza Bagolino
- Piazza Ciullo

== Sources ==
- Di Graziano, Anna Angela. Note e Documenti per la Storia di Alcamo nei secoli XIII e XIV. Rome: il centro di ricerca.
- "Piazze principali". Archived from the original on 14 March 2018.
- Calia, Roberto (1997). I palazzi dell'aristocrazia e della borghesia alcamese. Alcamo: Carrubba.
- Regina, Vincenzo (1967). il castello trecentesco dei Conti di Modica in Alcamo. Alcamo: Accademia di studi Cielo D'Alcamo.
- Atto deliberativo della Giunta Municipale, May 1962
