= San Giuseppe Lavoratore, Alcamo =

Church building in Alcamo, Italy

San Giuseppe Lavoratore
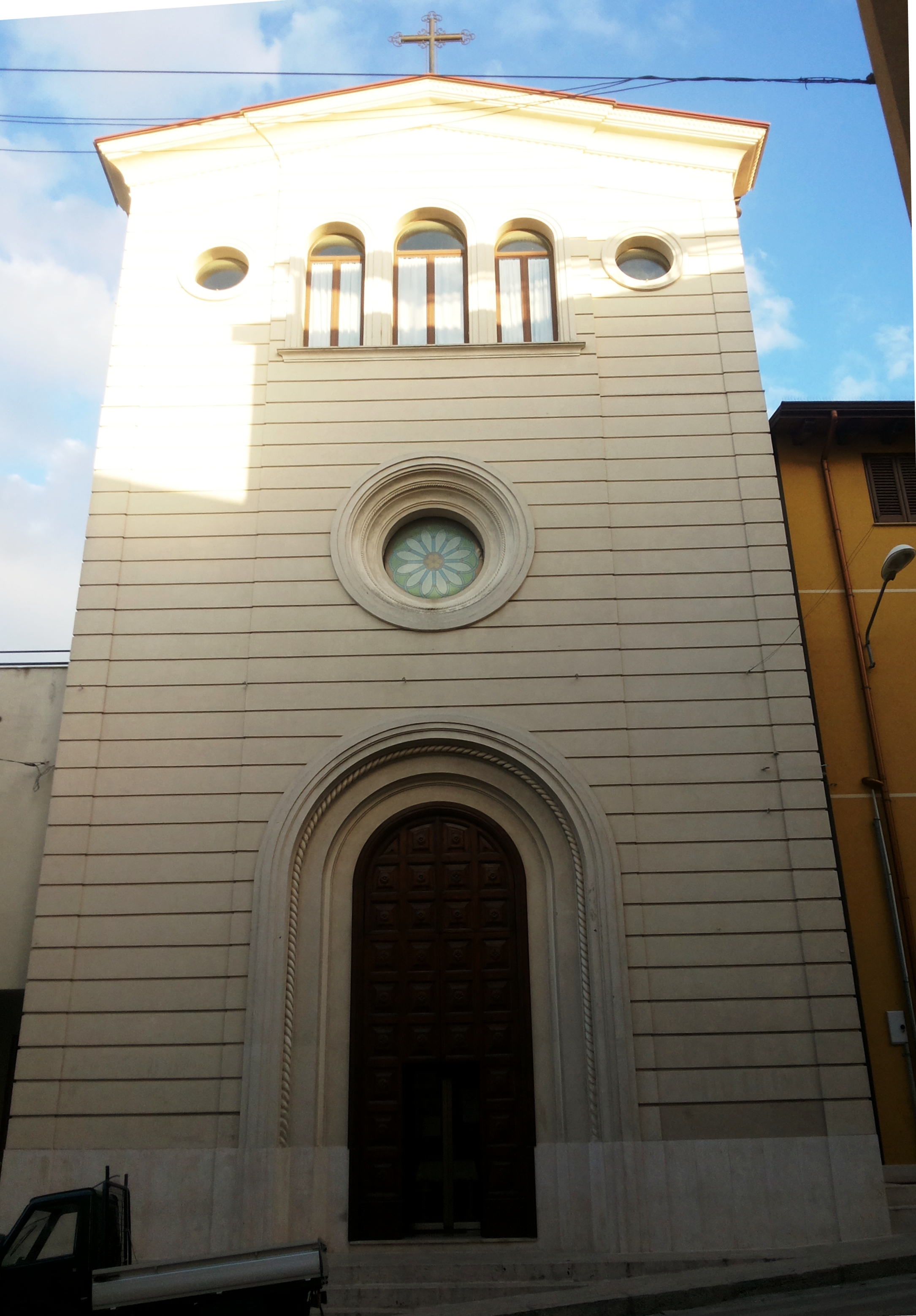
- The façade

Religion
- Affiliation: Catholic
- Province: province of Trapani
- Region: Sicily
- Rite: Catholic
- Patron: saint Joseph
- Year consecrated: 1947

Location
- Location: Alcamo, province of Trapani, Italy
- Municipality: Alcamo
- State: Italy
- Interactive map of San Giuseppe Lavoratore
- Territory: Alcamo
- Coordinates: 37°58′40″N 12°57′36″E

Architecture
- Architect: Giuseppe Russo
- Style: modern
- Founder: Father Bartolomeo Palumbo
- Groundbreaking: 1946
- Completed: 1947

Website
- http://www.sangiuseppealcamo.it/

San Giuseppe Lavoratore ("Saint Joseph the Worker") is a Catholic Church located in Alcamo, in the province of Trapani.

== History ==
On 3 February 1944 the Bishop of Mazara, monsignor Salvatore Ballo, gave the permit to build this church, and they start works on 22 January 1945.

Thanks to the priest Bartolomeo Palumbo, it was founded in 1946 on a piece of land given by a lady and built after the plan of Giuseppe Russo, an engineer; it already became a parish in 1947.

The same year, the parson, Father Palumbo, founded the male and female Congregation of saint Joseph the Worker; every year, on 23 January, they celebrated the festivity of Saint Joseph's Marriage, by taking part to the Mass, during which the married couples were blessed. Later both the congregations joined the parish Association of Azione Cattolica.

In 1949 he founded the male and female Congregations of Maria Santissima di Fatima: the scope was that of solemnizing the month of May and the feast of Our Lady of Fatima on May 13, moreover they had to take part to the Mass on the first Saturday each month. They also joined the Associations of Azione Cattolica later.

Saint Joseph the Worker is celebrated on May 1, in the district of San Ciusippuzzu. Besides religious ceremonies and the procession, there are musical and theatrical shows and bike races.

== Father Palumbo ==
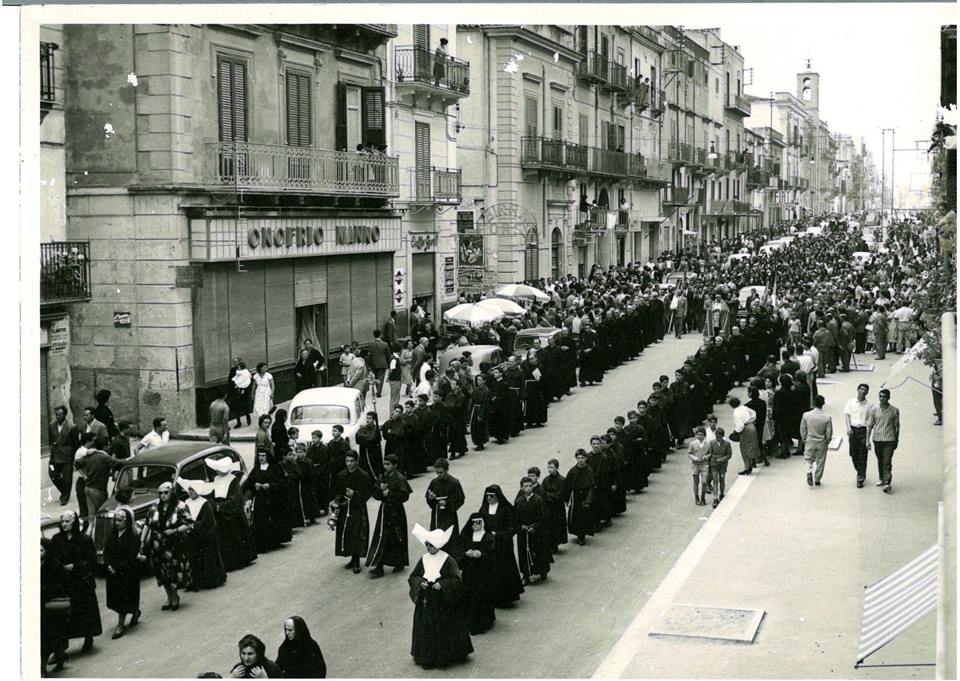
Corteo funebre di Padre Palumbo

Father Palumbo was born in Alcamo on 29 August 1915 and became a priest in 1941; he soon had the office of Vicar Cooperator in the parishes of the Church of the Saints Paul and Bartholomew, Church of the Holy Crucifix (or Saint Francis of Paola) and Church of the Holy Souls in Purgatory. He was also nominated as honorary Canon (priest) of the collegiate church of the Mother church.

On bare feet, with a cross on his hands and a great number of believers, on 30 April 1944 he went towards the quarter of Balatelle (a suburb at that time) on the piece of land which had been donated to him by Mrs. Annunziata Macaluso, the widow of the chemist doctor Fazio, put down the cross there and, since then, every Sunday he celebrated the Holy Mass on a makeshift altar.

Until he stayed in seminary he was a great devotee of Saint Joseph: during the night he got up, kneeled and recited the rosary in honour of him, this prayer in dialect, very interesting also from the symbolical point of view:

Scura stasira agghiorna dumani

la pruvvidenza m’aviti a mannari.

(It was a prayer asking for Providence from the Saint). He asked for saint Joseph's protection both for his family and the Church, then he put his project on the Saint's hands. In 1947 he succeeded in completing the basement below the Church and start celebrating Mass there.[4]

With his zeal and faith, Father Palumbo succeeded in dragging all the district and citizens to contribute to the costs for completing the building of the Church by any type of offerings, even in kind (wheat, eggs, legumes, flour, etc.). He used all these things, however, to help a lot of people in need too; there are so many stories about his great goodness. He succeeded also in creating a parish community very united and open to charity.

With the bishop's bull of May 3, 1947, the Church was elevated to a parish and the following day the Bishop of Mazara del Vallo, His Excellency Monsignor Ballo, gave father Palumbo the canonical possession. Father Palumbo's mother, signora Vita Rocca, had donated her dowry for the legal recognition of the Parish, which was given with the Decree of the President of Republic on 10 June 1948.

On 30 May he died, leaving his parish community and the whole town in anguish for his untimely end: there were thousands of people at his funeral.

He was buried in the old cemetery Cappuccini in Alcamo and, after the approval by His Excellency Mons. Alessandro Plotti, on 22 October 2013, by popular demand of believers, his mortal remains were moved to his Church.

== Description and works ==
The façade is elegant and in Romanesque style; the interior is with one nave and a coffered ceiling.

There are these works: :

- Wooden statue of saint Joseph with the Infant Jesus in his arms made by Giuseppe Di Caro, a sculptor from Palermo, in 1952. The mantle of the saint is covered with pure gold, and their clothes with silver.
- An Angel trumpet player and the Angel musician: both chromium-plated by Gino Patti, the surrealist painter from Alcamo, on the walls behind the high altar
- Wooden statue of Our Lady of Fatima, right altar, realized by Giuseppe Stuflesser from Ortisei (Bolzano) in 1949
- Statue of Christ the King, left altar, realized by Luigi Santifaller in 1954. Below it there is the sarcophagus with the mortal remains of the Reverend Father Palumbo.

== See also ==
- Catholic Church in Italy

== Sources ==
- Vincenzo Regina: La chiesa parrocchiale di San Giuseppe in ALcamo; Grafiche Campo, 2005
- Carlo Cataldo: Guida storico-artistica dei beni culturali di Alcamo-Calatafimi-Castellammare Golfo p. 84; Sarograf, Alcamo,1982
- Carlo Cataldo: La conchiglia di S.Giacomo p. 190; Campo, Alcamo, 2001
- Tommaso Papaː Memorie storiche del clero di Alcamo; ediz.Accademia di studi Cielo d'Alcamo, Alcamo, 1968
