= Alcamo Marina Massacre =

Strage di Alcamo Marina
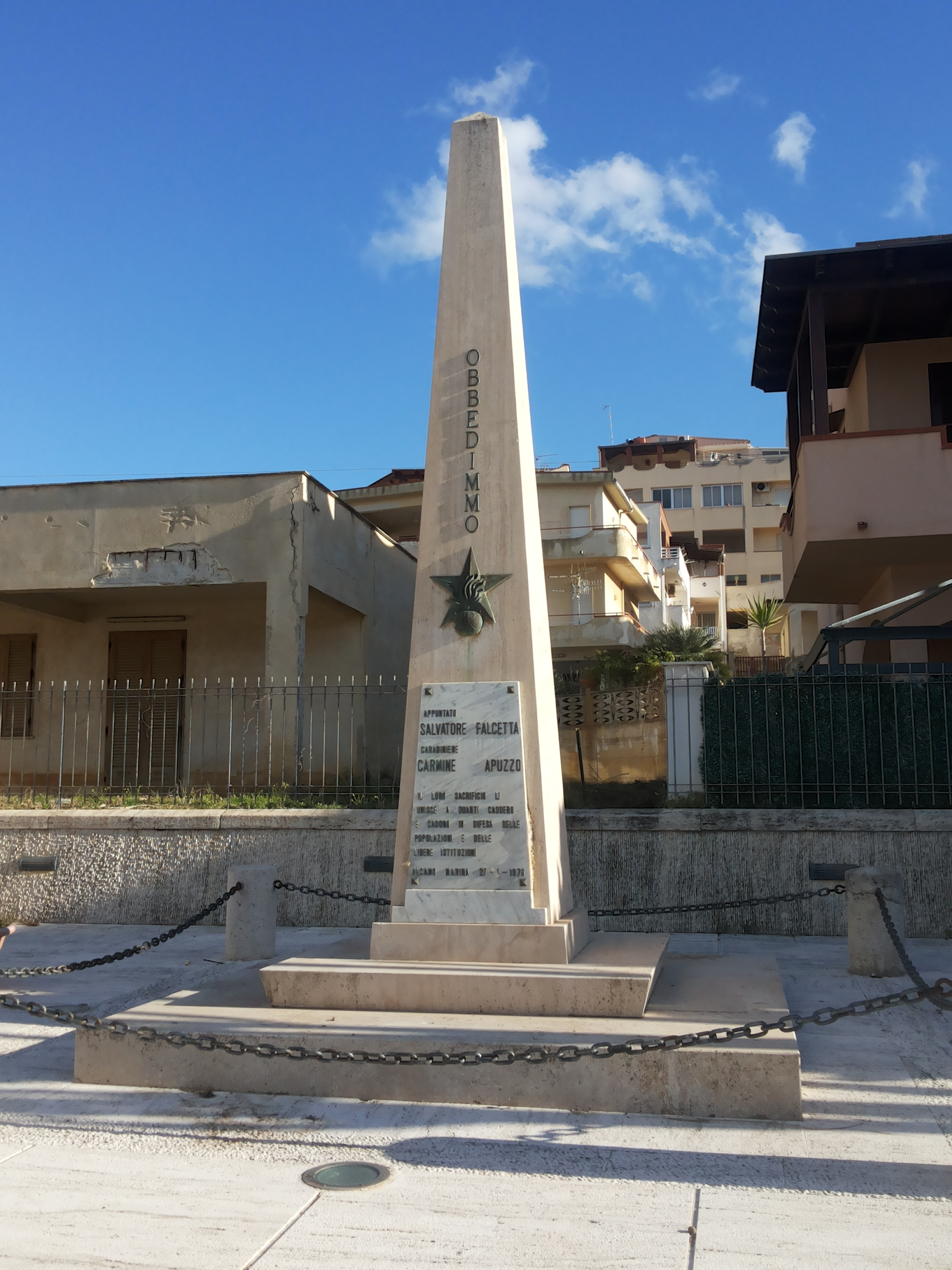
- Monument to the fallen Carabinieri officers Falcetta and Apuzzo
- Location: Alcamo Marina, Sicily, Italy
- Date: 27 January 1976
- Attack type: firearms
- Deaths: two Carabinieri officers
- Perpetrator: Unknown

The Massacre of Alcamo Marina refers to a double murder that occurred on 27 January 1976 in a Carabinieri station at Alcamo Marina, situated in the province of Trapani in the Italian island of Sicily. In the middle of the night, unknown gunmen broke into the station and shot dead two Carabinieri officers. Initially the Red Brigades were suspected, although they denied having anything to do with the attack, but eventually some youngsters from the area, including Giuseppe Gulotta, were arrested and convicted, and then absolved after more than 30 years. The Gulotta case represents one of the worst cases of miscarriage of justice and unjust detention in Italian history: Gulotta spent 22 years in jail and was then acquitted during a revisal of the trial, which took place after one of the Carabinieri officers involved in the investigation admitted that Gulotta's confession was obtained through torture and intimidation.

The massacre remains unsolved: the most accredited hypotheses involve the Mafia, terrorist organizations involved in Italy's strategy of tension, members of the Gladio organization, or a crime related to weapons trafficking.

== The murders ==
Two Carabinieri officers, the nineteen years old Carmine Apuzzo and corporal Salvatore Falcetta, were killed inside the "Alkmar" barracks of the Carabinieri station in Alcamo Marina. During the night, using a blowtorch, unknown perpetrators broke through the fortified door and the two Carabinieri guards were gunned down as they slept. The massacre was discovered only the morning after, when a police patrol going through the area noticed the broken door and alerted the authorities.

== The investigation ==
From the start, there were several investigation hypotheses: from red terrorism (there were some claims done by extra-parliamentary groups, but the Red brigades denied responsibility), to the Mafia. Suspicion on the Mafia was high because the year before in Alcamo Marina there were two murders which occurred within one month of each other: that of Francesco Paolo Guarrasi, assessor of public works of Alcamo and former DC-affiliated mayor, and that of Antonio Piscitello, the municipal councilor of the town. The investigation was led by the then Carabinieri captain Giuseppe Russo, who would later be murdered by the Corleonesi.

In the end, the investigation shifted to a group of young people from the area, and resulted in the arrest and conviction of four people: Giuseppe Gulotta, Giovanni Mandalà, Gaetano Santangelo and Vincenzo Ferrantelli. The first two were sentenced to life in prison, whereas Gaetano Santangelo (arrested only in 1995) and Vincenzo Ferrantelli to 20 years. A mechanic from Partinico, considered close to anarchist circles, Giuseppe Vesco, confessed to the massacre and accused the four youngsters, only to retract his testimony immediately afterwards: he was found mysteriously hanged in his jail cell some months afterwards, despite having only one hand.

Mandalà died of natural causes after years of jail in 1998, whereas Santangelo (until 1995, when he was arrested) and Ferrantelli, from an appeal to the next, fled Italy to Brazil and obtained the status of refugees there. Gulotta spent about 22 years in jail, before being granted parole and the revision of the trial. Only on 22 July 2010, after 22 years of detention, Gulotta was in fact released from jail on probation. Gulotta, Santangelo and Ferrantelli obtained a new trial following the revelations of a former Carabinieri officer, Renato Olino, on the illegal methods used to coerce the four into giving false confessions.

Peppino Impastato, an activist and journalist who was later killed by the Mafia in 1978, did a series of investigations into the strange aspects surrounding the arrest and trial of Gulotta and his friends. The folder containing the documents on Alcamo Marina done by Impastato was taken by the Carabinieri (who at the time accused Impastato of dying while trying to set a bomb on train tracks, whereas in reality, he was killed by mafiosi on the orders of Gaetano Badalamenti) in the house of his mother Felicia Impastato shortly after Peppino's death, and it was never given back to the family unlike the other documents (as explained by his brother Giovanni).

Walter Veltroni, member of the Commissione Parliamentare Antimafia, stated that the perpetrators of the Alcamo Marina massacre were agents of the Gladio organization. According to him, the day before the massacre Falcetta and Apuzzo had stopped a van carrying weapons driven by men of the organization, who then assaulted the barracks in order to get them back. Fifteen years after the massacre the police discovered an arsenal belonging to two Carabinieri officers: the corporal Vincenzo La Colla, lead of the escort for the former Culture minister Vincenza Bono Parrino, at the time president of the Defense Commission of the Senate, and the brigadier Fabio Bertotto (several times involved in missions in Somalia). They were accused of supplying weapons to the Mafia clan of Alcamo and were revealed to be members of the secret services, and were eventually acquitted. La Colla pleaded guilty to illegal detention of firearms.

== New revelations by brigadier Olino ==
Following the declarations given by the former brigadier Renato Olino to a trapanese newspaper, according to which the confessions by Giuseppe Vesco and the others arrested were obtained through torture, in 2008 the tribunal of Trapani opened two inquiries. One on the deaths of the two Carabinieri officers, and another on four Carabinieri accused of kidnapping and serious bodily harm: they are Giuseppe Scibilia, Elio Di Bona, Giovanni Provenzano and Fiorino Pignatella.

Olino explained to the judges of the tribunal in Trapani that the arrested men had nothing to do with the massacre and the confessions were exacted through incredibly violent methods. Vesco, because he was found to have weapons and bullet casings compatible (but not identical) to the ones found at the murder scene, was even tortured with electroshock and waterboarding to exact a confession, and following this (according to Mafia pentito Vincenzo Calcara) was assassinated in his cell because he had retracted his testimony and accused the Carabinieri. Gulotta and the others were severely and repeatedly beaten and abused, and at the home of one of them the Carabinirei planted money originating from a robbery. All of them were threatened with death.

From telephone interceptions acquired by the tribunal of Trapani, on the sons of Giovanni Provenzano, as they talk between each other and to other relatives on details revealed to them by their father, it was revealed how the same officers, to make the accusations against them seem false, went out of their way to change the furniture of the rooms where the arrested were tortured.

== The acquittals ==
The first revision of the trial began in January 2011 in front of the Corte di Assise of Reggio Calabria. A Mafia pentito, Vincenzo Clacara, spoke during a trial of a role of the mafia in the massacre, linking it to the Gladio organization, which during the 70s already had several bases present in Trapani. From what was said, the Carabinieri could have been killed for having stopped a van full of weapons destined to Gladio itself. The lawyer of one of two accused in the trial declared «the new revelations in this trial demonstrate a link between the massacre of Alcamo Marina and the kidnappings of Nicola Campisi and Luigi Corleo (brother in law of Nino Salvo), which occurred on July of 1975». Corleo was assassinated and his body has never been found.

On 26 January 2012 the procurator general of the Appeal Court of Reggio Calabria asked for the acquittal from any accusation for Giuseppe Gullotta, who was still serving his life sentence on probation, acquittal reached definitely on 13 February of the same year, exactly 36 years after his arrest. The tribunal also declared the probable innocence of the deceased Mandalà and Vesco, and, also acquitted of all charges Giuseppe Ferrantelli and Gaetano Santangelo. The acquittal of Gulotta became definitive, and the minors section for the appeal court in Catania absolved Ferrantelli and Santangelo (who were underage at the time of the arrest).

In 2014, the appeal court of Trapani officially absolved and rehabilitated Giovanni Mandalà. The Alcamo Marina Massacre remains today an unsolved mystery.

== Bibliography ==
- Vincenzo Tessandori, Alcamo, morti misteriose, in Br. Imputazione: banda armata. Baldini Castoldi Dalai, 2004. ISBN 88-8490-277-0
- Edward F. Mickolus, Susan L. Simmons, Terrorism, 1992-1995: a chronology of events and a selectively annotated bibliography ABC-CLIO, 1997. ISBN 0-313-30468-8
- Enrico Deaglio, Il raccolto rosso, 1982-2010: cronaca di una guerra di mafia e delle sue tristissime conseguenze, pp. 318–319. Il Saggiatore, 2010. ISBN 88-428-1620-5
- Nicola Biondo, Giuseppe Gulotta, Alkamar. La mia vita in carcere da innocente, Edizioni Chiarelettere, 2015
