= Gino Patti =

Italian painter

Gino Patti (1925–1993) was a surrealist painter of the 20th century; he was of noble heritage and native from Alcamo, in Sicily.

== Biography ==
He was born in Alcamo, where he attended the secondary school; he was lazy and undisciplined, because he felt like being in a prison, in spite of that, he wanted to learn what he liked. In high school he started reading books about philosophy, aesthetics and music: his favourites were Kant, Croce, Schopenauer, Beethoven and Wagner; he also read books about architecture and liked gothic style.

Gino Patti finished his long studies by graduating in Jurisprudence at the university of Palermo, then he felt free to do what he wished, so he started reading a lot about painting and began to paint.

He made an exhibition in Alcamo, more to please his friends, and all his paintings were sold; he took part in the first Provincial Exhibition of Figurative Arts of Trapani (look at the article written by professor Gianni Di Stefano on the magazine Trapani-anno I, n.4 of 15 August 1956) and in the prize Alcide de Gasperi in 1956.

From 1957 onwards he took part in art exhibitions in Italy. His works are now in Italian and International galleries and in various private collections.

Luigi Spazzapan, to whom Patti had shown some of his pictures in Rome, was immediately struck by Gino Patti's new style of painting; besides painting, he studied the masters of past in order to learn the secrets of art. In that period he met Pippo Rizzo, a professor at the Accademia di Belle Arti di Palermo and a futurist painter who advised him.

Pippo Rizzo wrote that Patti depicts clouds, beaches, skies, small trees, figures with a child’s loving attention..

The Sacred Military Constantinian Order, the Rotary Club, the Associazione Arte a Confronto and different sponsors organized an exposition of Patti at the Rubino Hall of Centro Congressi Marconi.

=== Patti's painting ===
According to Gino Patti the merit of surrealism was that of drawing attention on the fact that art is an operation of spirit, so an introspective examination and not a study or interpretation of objective reality.

=== Selected works ===
- Ritratto della madre, April 1956
- I cipressi di Dioniso, at the Town Hall of Alcamo (March 1956)
- Crocefissione, Private Collection Spinelli (May 1956)
- Ai confini del sogno, property of the author, (June 1956)
- Il dramma del torso, at the Department of Finances of the Sicilian Region (March 1956)
- Sinfonia di archi, property of the author, (July 1956)
- Sacrificio, property of the Sicilian Regional Assembly (A.R.S.) inside Palazzo dei Normanni in Palermo (February 1956)
- Le arpe del tempo, Collection La Roche of New York (1960)
- Ritmi di zolfo liquido, property of Società Mineraria Bisi
- Stato d’animo 276, (1962)
- Sinfonia K24, gallery of modern art of Lissone
- Stato d’animo 215 (1962)
- Evento ed emozione (1962)
- Emozione in blu (1962)
- Evento n.101, Collection Avv. Somma)
- Angelo trombettiere, chromed, in the church of San Giuseppe Lavoratore in Alcamo
- Angelo musicante, chromed, in the church of San Giuseppe Lavoratore in Alcamo

== See also ==
- Luigi Spazzapan
- Surrealism

== Sources ==
- "Artisti del Trapanese Gino Patti" (PDF).
- "Gino Patti Gino, il pittore surrealista". 10 October 2013.
- "Attualità di Gino Patti" (PDF).
- Albano Rossi: Gino Patti, Palermo, 1968
