= Turi Simeti =

Italian painter (1929–2021)

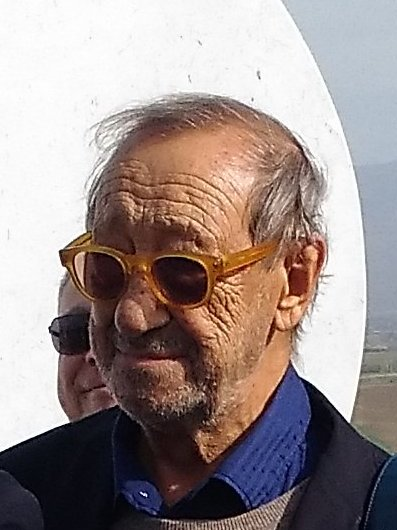
- Born: 5 August 1929; Alcamo, Sicily, Italy
- Died: 16 March 2021 (aged 91); Milan, Italy
- Known for: Painting
- Website: archivioturisimeti.it

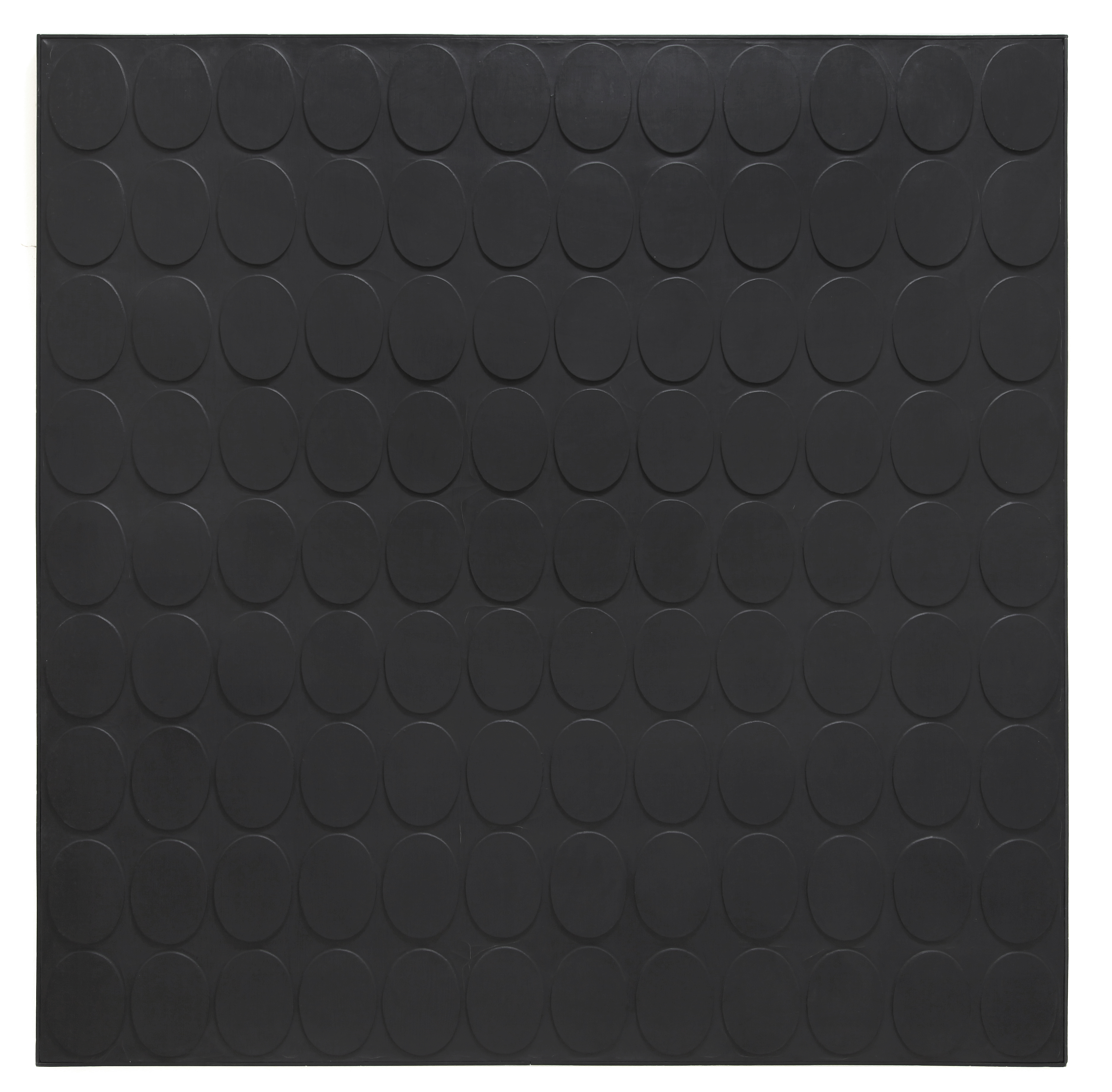
Black ovals

Turi Simeti (5 August 1929 – 16 March 2021) was an Italian artist whose work focused on monochromatic painting and the use of oval reliefs. Active from the late 1950s until his death, he was associated with the Italian postwar avant-garde and participated in exhibitions connected to the European ZERO movement. His paintings explore the physical properties of the canvas and the effects of light on its surface.

== Biography ==
Simeti was born in Alcamo, Sicily, in 1929. He initially studied law in Palermo before moving to Rome in 1958. There he became acquainted with several artists, including Alberto Burri, whose experiments with materials influenced his early work.

In the early 1960s, Simeti began experimenting with the oval, a geometric form that became the principal element of his work. His paintings increasingly incorporated shaped elements beneath monochromatic canvases, creating raised surfaces that responded to changes in lighting.

In 1965, he moved to Milan and participated in ZERO Avantgarde, an exhibition organised by Nanda Vigo in the studio of Lucio Fontana. During the same period, he exhibited in Italy and elsewhere in Europe, including his first solo exhibition at Galerie Wulfengasse in Klagenfurt, Austria.

During the following decades, Simeti continued to develop his work with monochromatic surfaces and reliefs. He exhibited frequently in Germany and Switzerland, where his work was associated with developments in geometric abstraction and the investigation of space through painting.

Simeti died in Milan on 16 March 2021, aged 91.

== Artistic practice ==
Simeti's paintings are characterised by the use of a limited number of geometric forms, most frequently the oval. Rather than creating an image through conventional pictorial techniques, he modified the structure of the canvas to produce reliefs. Their visibility depends on the surrounding light, which generates shadows and variations across the painted surface.

His work has been discussed in relation to the experiments of Lucio Fontana, Enrico Castellani and Agostino Bonalumi, particularly their investigations of the relationship between painting and three-dimensional space. Within this context, Simeti developed a practice based on the repeated use and changing placement of oval forms.

=== Silence and perception ===
The notion of silence has been a recurring subject in critical writing about Simeti's paintings. Art critic Patrizia Ferri examined the relationship between the artist's restrained formal language and the perceptual experience of his work. She associated the reduced number of pictorial elements with an increased emphasis on the viewer's awareness of the surface and its spatial qualities.

The use of monochrome and the arrangement of reliefs create compositions in which the surrounding areas of the canvas are as significant as the geometric forms themselves. This relationship between occupied and unoccupied space remained an important aspect of Simeti's work throughout his career.

=== Distruzione di un aliante (1971) ===
In 1971, Simeti presented Distruzione di un aliante (Destruction of a Glider) at Galleria La Bertesca in Genoa. The project involved a glider that the artist restored and painted blue before destroying it during a public performance on 5 March 1971. Its remains were subsequently preserved in blue metal containers.

The performance extended Simeti's practice beyond painting, introducing the physical transformation and destruction of an object as part of the artistic process. The project was documented in a publication featuring a text by art critic Lea Vergine.

According to the Fondazione Archivio Turi Simeti, Distruzione di un aliante entered the permanent collection of MAMbo – Museo d'Arte Moderna di Bologna and was included in a new presentation of the collection in February 2026.

== Museum collections ==
Simeti's works are held in several European public museum collections. The Centre Pompidou in Paris holds Settantadue ovali neri (1962). The MAMCO (Musée d'art moderne et contemporain) in Geneva includes 4 ovali bianchi (2015) in its collection. The MAMbo – Museo d'Arte Moderna di Bologna is reported by the artist's archive to hold material from Distruzione di un aliante (1971).

== Awards ==
In 2014, Simeti received the Artist of the Year award from the Circolo della Stampa di Milano.
