= Cielo d'Alcamo =

Sicilian poet

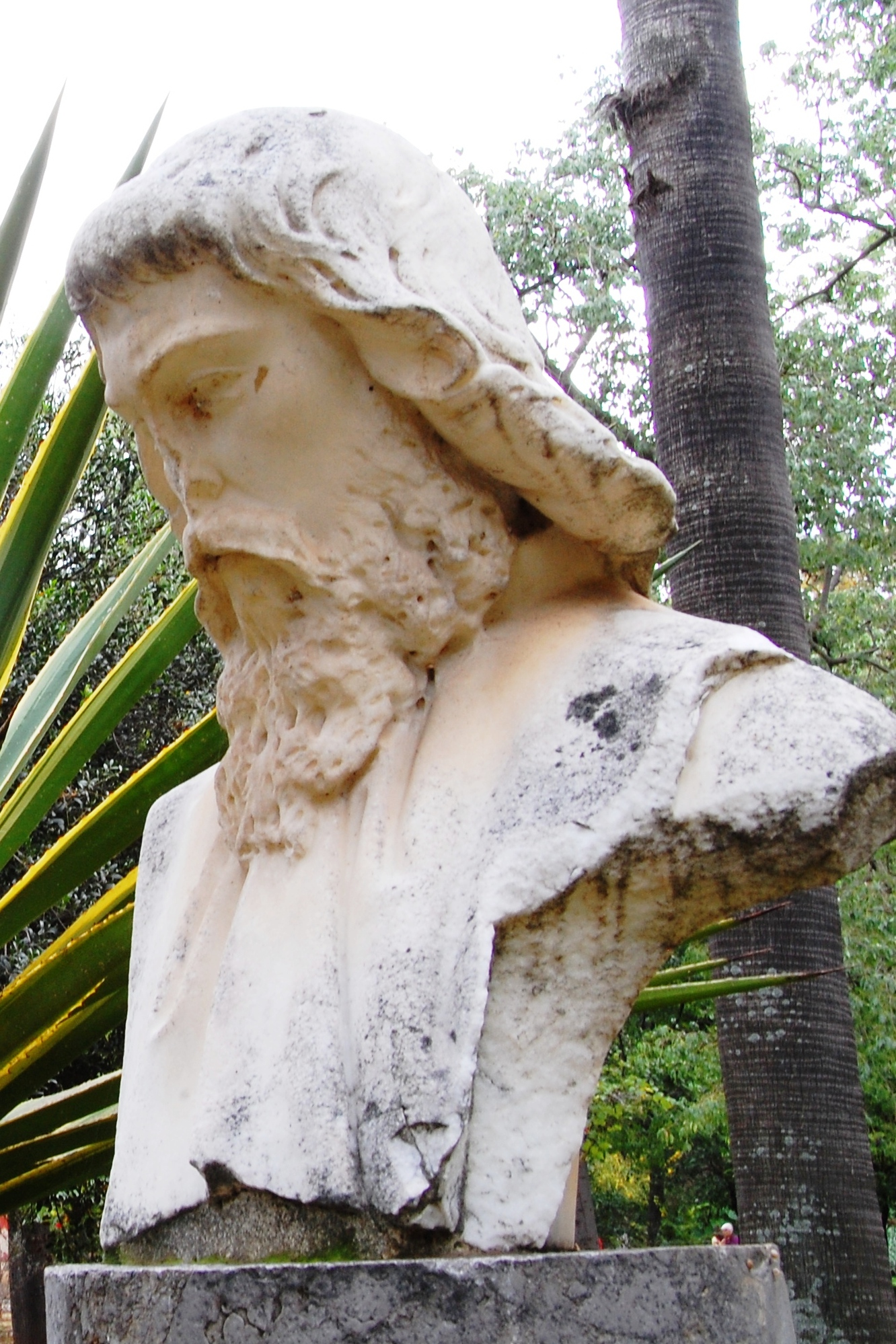
Cielo d'Alcamo, Villa Giulia (Palermo), Italy

Cielo d'Alcamo (Italian: [ˈtʃɛːlo ˈdalkamo]), also spelled Ciullo, was an Italian poet, born in the early 13th century. He is considered one of the fathers of Italian medieval jester poetry. His traditional surname (which would mean "from Alcamo", a town in northwestern Sicily) has been differently identified by other scholars as Dalcamo (the modern form of the name "Cielo" is "Michele" or "Michael"). Cielo d'Alcamo and fellow 13th century Sicilian poet Giacomo da Lentini are jointly credited as the inventors of the sonnet as a verse form.

D'Alcamo is known exclusively from the poem "Rosa Fresca Aulentissima" ("Fresh and Very Perfumed Rose"), written in Messina-area Sicilian dialect with influences from mainland Italian dialects and which survives only in a single codex now in the Vatican Library. Similarly to the balcony scene from William Shakespeare's Romeo and Juliet, a young suitor sneaks into the garden of a young lady from a noble family and declares his love for her. He tries to seduce the girl with a devastatingly brutal parody of the Sicilian School's love poetry clichés. In reply, the girl berates him for his "ill" intentions, vowing to protect her honour, but her prudishness is just a façade to force her admirer to keep trying harder, until at last she gives in completely to his bold advances. It also represents an equally on target satire of contemporary Troubadour poetry from Provence, as well as the literary language developed by the "Magna Curia" of poets surrounding Emperor Frederick II at his court in Palermo. The date of the poem has been assigned to sometime between 1231 and 1250.

Identified by some scholars (such as Francesco De Sanctis) as a very popular work, "Rosa fresca aulentissima" was written by a very cultured and sophisticated multilingual poet, as testified by his knowledge of works such as the Roman de la Rose and by his likely involvement in Frederick II's court.

== See also ==
- Sicilian School

== Bibliography ==
- Alio, Jacqueline (2018). Queens of Sicily 1061-1266. Trinacria. pp. 549–562.
- Contini, Gianfranco (1960). Poeti del Duecento. Vol. I. Milan-Naples: Ricciardi. pp. 177–185.
- Mazzuchelli, Giammaria (1753). Gli scrittori d' Italia cioè notizie storiche, e critiche intorno alle vite, e agli scritti dei litterati italiani (in Italian). Bossini. p. 352.
- Mendola, Louis (2015). Sicily's Rebellion against King Charles (includes poem of Cielo d'Alcamo in Sicilian and English). ISBN 9781943639038.
- Mineo, Niccolò (1981). "CIELO d'Alcamo". Dizionario Biografico degli Italiani, Volume 25: Chinzer–Cirni (in Italian). Rome: Istituto dell'Enciclopedia Italiana. ISBN 978-8-81200032-6.
