= Santissimo Crocifisso, Alcamo =

Roman Catholic church in Alcamo, Italy

Santissimo Crocifisso
- Chiesa del Santissimo Crocifisso
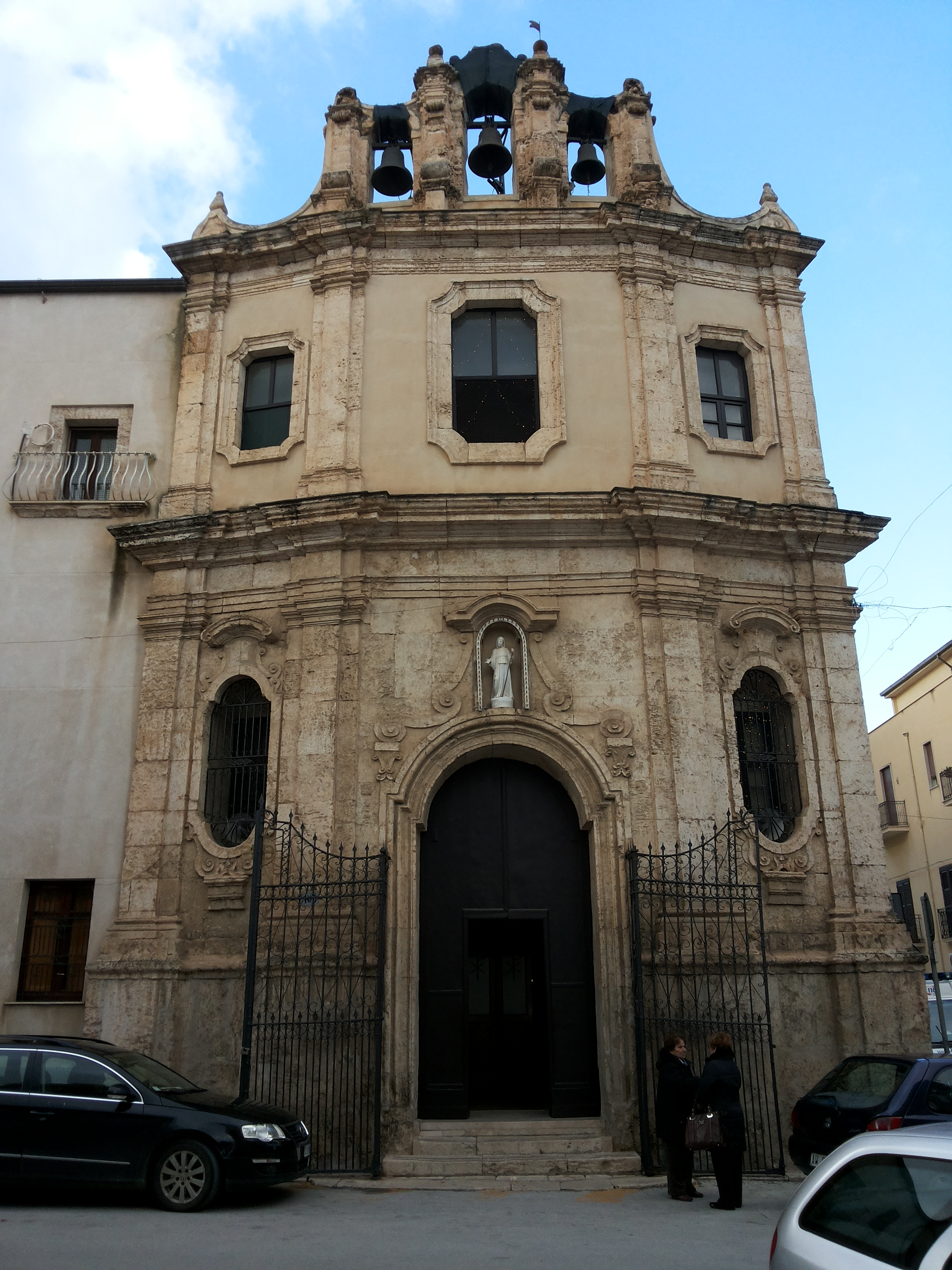
- The façade

Religion
- Affiliation: Minims
- Province: Trapani
- Region: Sicily
- Rite: Catholic
- Patron: the Holy Crucifix

Location
- Location: Alcamo, province of Trapani, Italy
- Municipality: Alcamo
- State: Italy
- Interactive map of Santissimo Crocifisso
- Territory: Alcamo
- Coordinates: 37°58′58″N 12°57′39″E

Architecture
- Type: rococo
- Founder: Pietro Tabone
- Groundbreaking: 1550

Website
- http://www.sanfrancescodipaolaalcamo.it/

Santissimo Crocifisso ("Holy Crucifix", also dedicated to San Francesco da Paola) is a Catholic church in Alcamo, in the province of Trapani, Sicily, southern Italy.

It is the seat of the Confraternity of the Most Holy Crucifix, which, in 1565, got the privilege of Fiera Franca from the count of Modica.

Adjoining the church there was the Friary of saint Francis of Paola.

== Foundation ==
It was founded in 1550 in the name of the Most Holy Crucifix by the nobleman Pietro Tabone, grandfather of the poet Sebastiano Bagolino’s, who was buried in this Church. In 1542 Tabone, after his request, had a piece of land by the municipality in order to build a Chapel dedicated to the Most Holy Crucifix, patron saint of the town at that time.

== History ==
The small chapel was built in 1550, without any consent by the Bishop of Mazara del Vallo; it was approved only two years after its construction. Tabone had the right to enlarge, pull down and rebuilt it, besides he could nominate the Rector and found a Confraternity of the Most Holy Crucifix. In 1575 there was a terrible plague: the population in Alcamo, about 7,700, was cut in half, according to the historian Ignazio De Blasi and a lot of people were buried in the cemetery Sant'Ippolito, in the western suburb. As the old hospitals of San Vito and Santo Spirito were not sufficient to receive so many plague victims, they set up a new one in the same street of the Chapel.

Owing to their economic difficulties which did not allow to complete the Church, in 1596 the administrators of the Confraternity decided to assign the Church to the Order of Minims of Saint Francis of Paola. In 1608 the Minims accepted the donation and built the adjoining friary which they maintained until 1866; since 1870 it hosted the Royal Gimnasium, and, after 1870, the Civic Hospital.

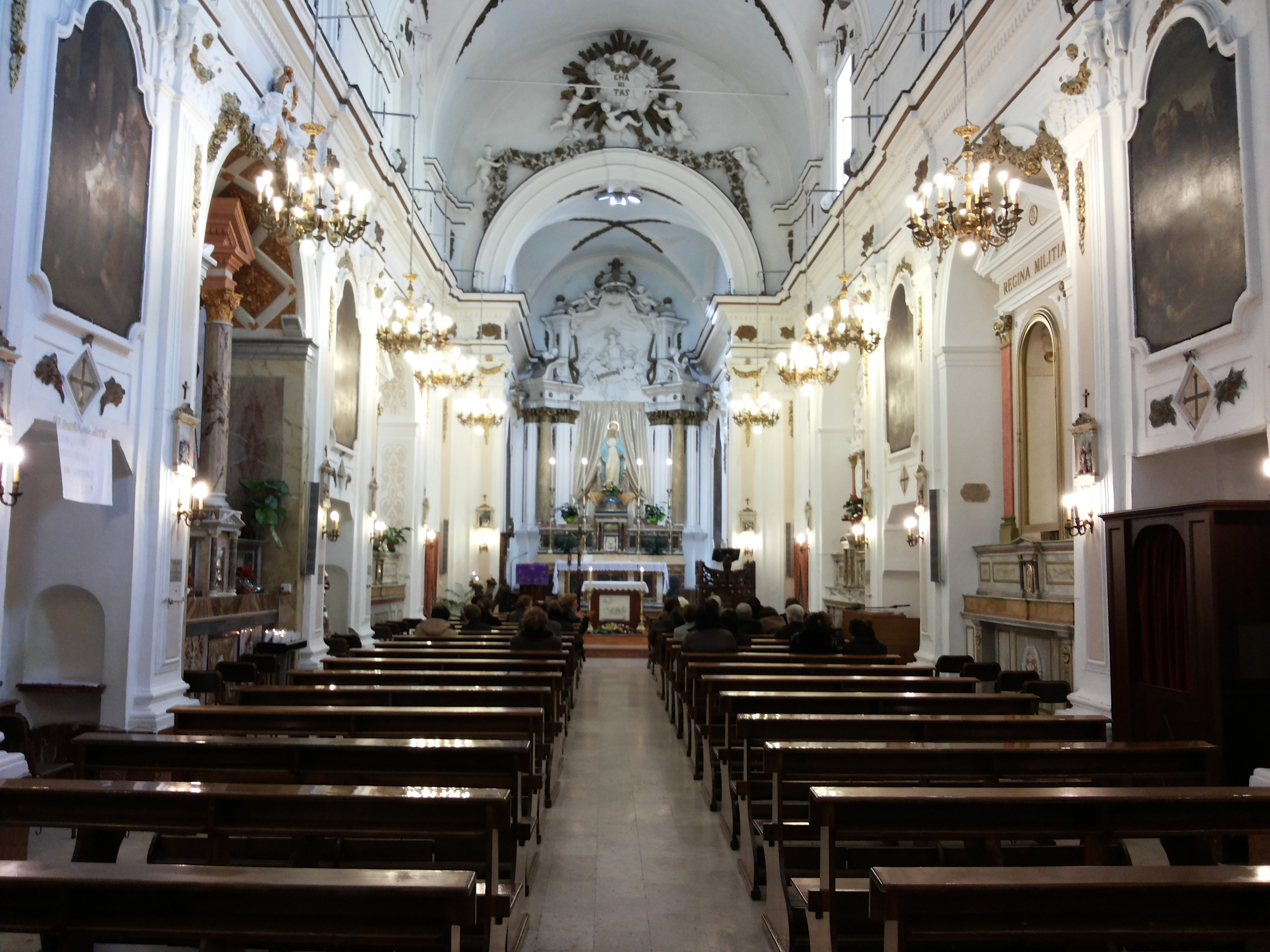
Interior of the church

The Minim Fathers distinguished themselves both for their religious activity and for the social engagement for the quarter; in 1780 forty-five priests from Alcamo signed a request to king Ferdinand III asking not to suppress the friary, as it had happened to other religious orders some years before. The cloister was not closed, but after the Unification of Italy, Victor Emmanuel II, king of Italy, abolished all religious orders and their properties were seized. Finally in 1926 the Church became a parish, dedicated to saint Francis of Paola.

== Works ==
The façade, dated 1695, has a convex form, a typical characteristic of Rococo Style. The church is with one nave and has five altars; in 1750 it was embellished with stuccoes by Nicolò Curti.

Inside it there the following works:

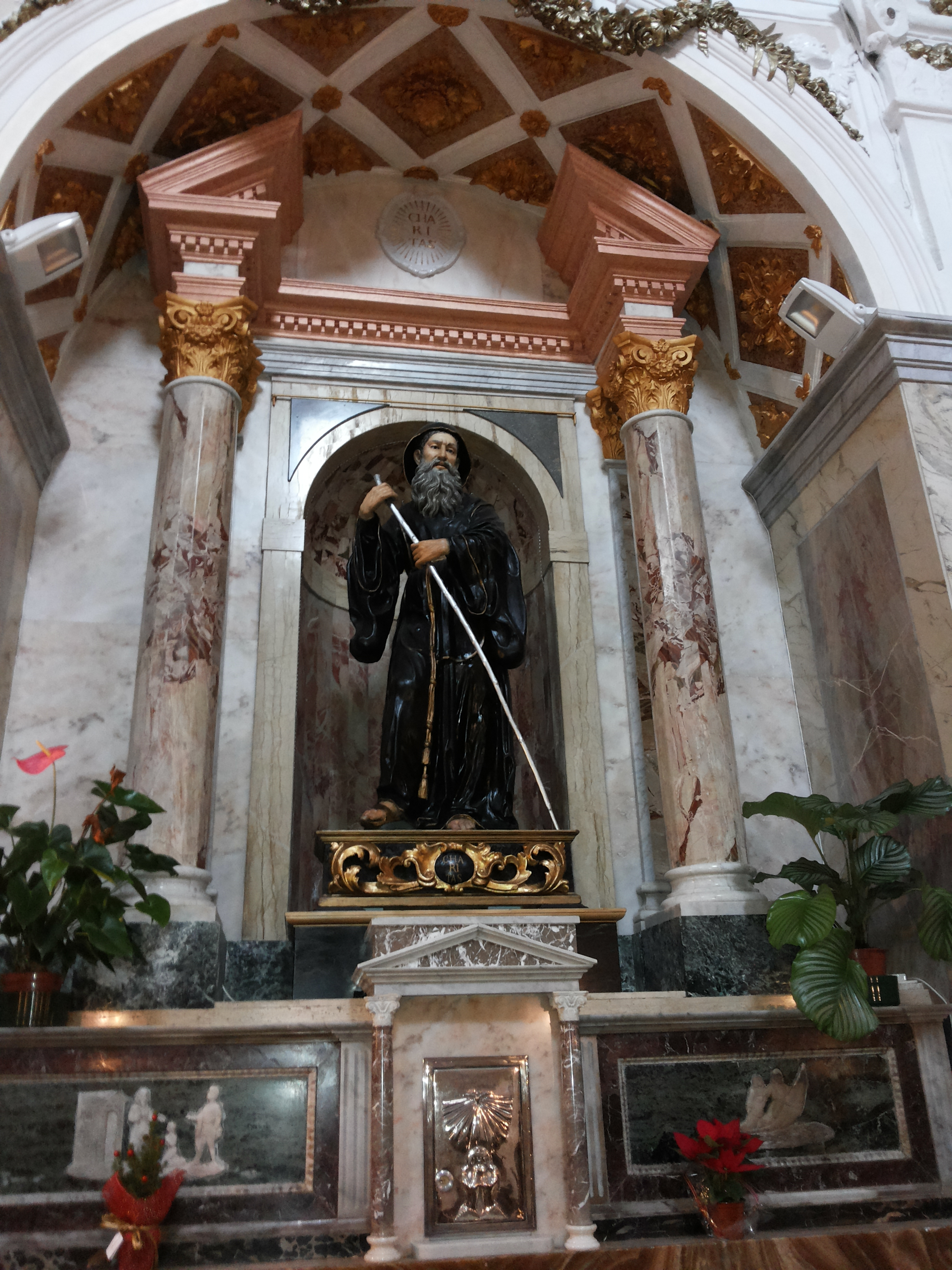
Altar of saint Francis of Paola

On the high altar: the Crucifix, a wooden sculpture made by Francesco Marino from Trapani in the 19th century.

On the left side:

- The Holy Trinity (by an unknown author), with the two saints Cosma e Damiano, Saint Rosalia and Saint Francis of Sales (1750), first canvas on the right side of the chapel
- Our Lady of Fatima, a recent wooden statue
- Saint Blaise, by an unknown author of the 18th century, coming from the Church of the Annunciation
- The Holy Heart of Jesus (Sacro Cuore di Gesù), a wooden statue, placed in 1921

On the right side:

- Our Lady of Miracles (Madonna dei Miracoli), with Saint Francis of Paola and Saint Francis of Sales (1750), made by an unknown author
- Saint Francis of Paola, a wooden statue, probable work of Filippo Quattrocchi from Gangi (18th century)
- Saint Anne, a wooden statue (end of the 19th century) which has replaced a ruined painting made in 1618 by Giuseppe Carrera
- The Immaculate, a recent plaster cast statue
- Saint Vitus, a wooden statue made in 1848
- A holy water stoup, carved in 1606 by Giuseppe Foti: at the church entrance.

On the nave walls there are four old paintings, by an unknown author and with stucco frames, representing some episodes of Saint Francis of Paola's life:

- The miracle happened during the building of the friary at Paterno Calabro (province of Cosenza) in 1454: two workers had died owing to a landslide and were resurrected by the Saint (the first on the right).
- The wonderful miracle of the fish made by saint Francis of Paola (the second painting on the right)
- A nobleman's family presents their baby without eyes and mouth; once again saint Francis makes an extraordinary miracle (first painting on the left wall);
- The conversion of the King of Naples, due to the Saint (second painting on the left).
- The founding of the Hebraic Easter (book of Exodus), on the right wall of the chapel of the Most Holy Sacrament;
- The banquet given by Lot to two Angels (book of Genesis), a painting on the left wall in the same chapel;

In the sacristy:

- The Crucifix made in mistura, by Giovanni Matinati (1550)
- Saint Lucy, a 17th-century statue by an unknown author;
- Saint Expeditus, a recent statue
- Madonna della Pietà, a canvas by an uncertain author of the 18th century
- Saint Catherine of Siena, painted by an uncertain author of the 18th century
- Saint Michael Archangel, an 18th-century statue
- Saint Francis of Paola, an 18th-century bust.

== See also ==
- Minim
- Saint Francis of Paola
- Diocese of Trapani

== Sources ==
- Cataldo, Carlo (1982). Guida storico-artistica dei beni culturali di Alcamo-Calatafimi-castellammare Golfo p. 76-78-79 (in Italian). Alcamo: Sarograf.
- Collura, Matteo (2008). Sicilia sconosciuta-Itinerari insoliti e curiosi (in Italian).
- Dara, Sergio (2014). Per crucem ad lucem: la chiesa del SS. Crocifisso di Alcamo e la sua confraternita nella parrocchia di San Francesco di Paola: cinque secoli di storia al servizio di Dio e degli uomini / a cura di Luigi Culmone; consulenza storico-artistica di Paola Bottecchia (in Italian). Alcamo: Rotary international, Club di Alcamo.
- Mistretta di Paola canonico, Vincenzo (1950). La Chiesa del SS. Crocifisso ora Chiesa parrocchiale di San Francesco di Paola (in Italian). Alcamo.
