= Order of Minims =

Catholic religious order of friars and nuns founded by St. Francis of Paola

- Order of Minims
- Ordo Minimorum
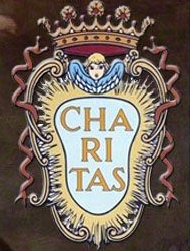

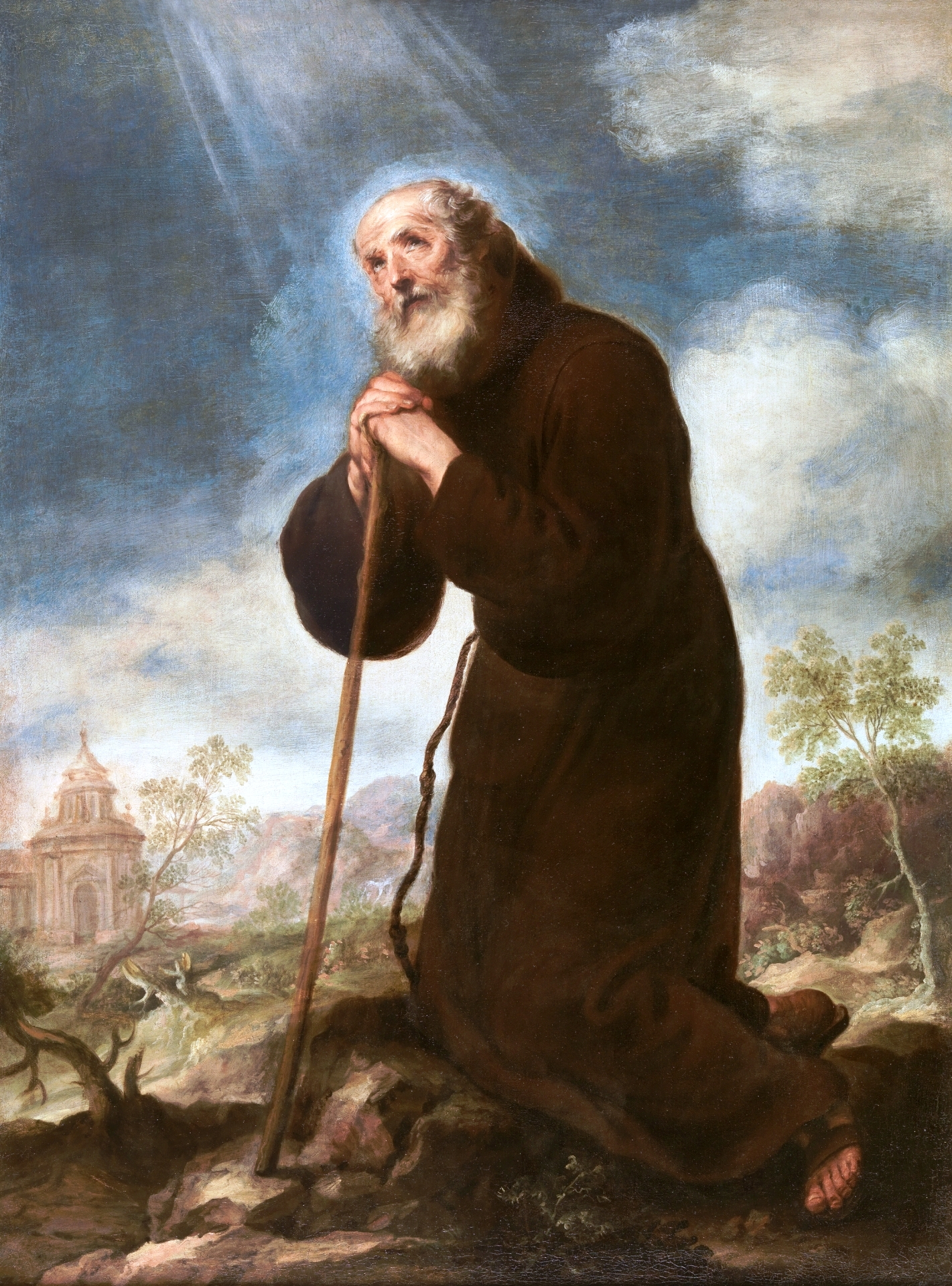
- Francis of Paola (1416–1507), founder of the Order of Minims
- Abbreviation: O.M.
- Formation: 1435
- Type: Mendicant order of pontifical right (for men) and contemplative communities (for women)
- Headquarters: Piazza San Francesco di Paola 10, 00184 Rome, Italy
- Members: 176 (including 123 priests) (2018)
- Corrector General: Gregorio Colatorti, O.M.
- Website: ordinedeiminimi.it

The Order of Minims (Latin: Ordo Minimorum, abbreviated O.M.), known in German-speaking countries as the Paulaner Order (German: Paulanerorden), are a mendicant order of friars and nuns in the Catholic Church, founded by Francis of Paola in fifteenth-century Italy. The Order soon spread to France, Germany and Spain, and continues to exist today. The order is known for their perpetual abstinence from all meat, eggs and dairy products.

Like the other mendicant orders, there are three separate components—called Orders—of the movement: the friars, contemplative nuns and a Third Order of laypeople who live in the world while following the spirit of the Order in their daily lives. At present there are only two fraternities of the Minim tertiaries; both are in Italy.

== History ==
The founder of the order, Francis of Paola, was born in 1416 and named in honor of Francis of Assisi. The boy became ill when he was only one month old, and his mother prayed to Saint Francis and promised that her son would spend a year in a Franciscan friary if he were healed. Francis recovered, which she believed meant that God had granted her prayer. At 13 years of age Francis fulfilled that votive year. After this year he dedicated himself to a life of solitude and penance as a hermit.

In 1435, two followers joined Francis and began the community, which was first called the "Poor Hermits of St. Francis of Assisi." Francis and his followers founded hermitages at Paterno in 1444 and Milazzo, Sicily, in 1469. The Archbishop of Cosenza approved the group and established them as a religious order on November 30, 1470, and this approval was confirmed by Pope Sixtus IV in his bull Sedes Apostolica of May 17, 1474. At that time, the pope also changed their status from that of hermits to mendicant friars.

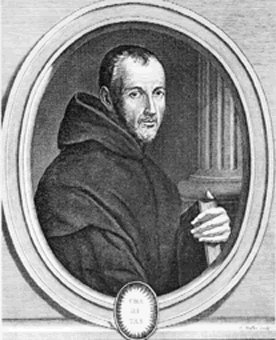
Marin Mersenne (1588–1648)

The name Minims comes from the Italian word minimo, meaning the smallest or the least, and their founder would call himself il minimo dei minimi. Francis of Paola wanted to distinguish himself as being of even less significance than the Friars Minor founded by his patron saint. Francis composed a rule for the community in 1493, which was approved under the name of "Hermits of the Order of the Minims". The definitive version of the rule was solemnly approved by Pope Julius II in the Bull Inter ceteros, July 28, 1506, who also simplified the name of the community to the Order of Minims (Latin: Ordo Minimorum).

In addition to the standard three religious vows of chastity, poverty and obedience, the rule contains the vow of "a Lenten way of life" (Latin: vita quadragesimalis), which is considered to be the distinctive feature of the Minims. This vow is for perpetual abstinence from all meat, eggs and dairy products, except in case of grave illness and by order of a physician. The order is also discalced.

The Minim habit consists of a black wool tunic, with broad sleeves, a hood, and a short scapular. It has a thick, black cord (with four knots that signify the four vows) with a tassel to gird the robe.

The Order of the Minims spread throughout Italy in the fifteenth century and was introduced to France in 1482, and later to Spain and to Germany in 1497. The houses in Spain, Germany, and France were suppressed during the period following the French Revolution. By the turn of the 20th century, only 19 friaries remained, all but one of them in Italy. On December 31, 2010, the order had 46 communities with 174 members, 112 of them priests. The majority of these were in Italy, but they are also established in Brazil, Cameroon, Colombia, the Democratic Republic of the Congo, the Czech Republic, India, Mexico, Spain, and the United States of America.

== Paulaner brewery ==
The Munich friary of the German Minims brewed beer as means of support, but after the friars were expelled, the brewery continued independently. It continues to brew the Paulaner brand of beer, which draws its name from Francis of Paola.

== Other Notable Minim friars ==
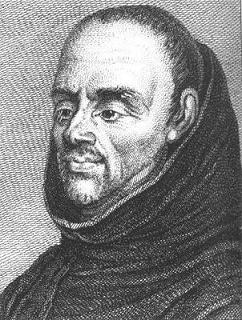
Charles Plumier (1646–1704)

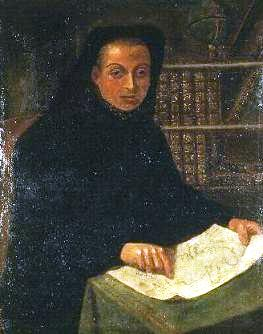
Louis Feuillée (1660–1732).

- Marin Mersenne (1588–1648)
- Emmanuel Maignan (1601–1676)
- Jean François Niceron (1613–1646)
- Charles Plumier (1646–1704)
- Fra Galgario (1655–1743)
- Louis Feuillée (1660–1732)

== The nuns ==
Francis was called to France in 1483 by King Louis XI to serve as his deathbed confessor. While he was there, the Spanish ambassador, Don Pedro de Lucena, who was a very pious man, grew to know and admire him. He sent reports of the holy friar to his family back in Jaén. His daughter, Elena, and her two daughters, Maria and Francisca, felt so inspired by Don Pedro's reports, they wanted to dedicate themselves to the way of life Francis had established. Through the ambassador, they communicated their interest to the saint, and asked for a rule of life which they might follow. Francis welcomed their request heartily, and, to this end, he adapted the rule of the friars for them to live as cloistered nuns.

Don Pedro donated a portion of his estate to the young women, and there they formed a small monastic community. They received the Minim religious habit from a Friar Lionet on June 11, 1495, and established the Monastery of Jesus and Mary. This was first and remains the oldest monastery of the Minim nuns. Francisca was elected as the first corrector (religious superior) of the community. She spent many years as the corrector of the monastery, gaining a reputation for holiness, and is today honored as Blessed Francisca. Their proper rule was approved by the Holy See in 1506, at the same time as that of the friars.

The Federation of Minim Nuns of Saint Francis of Paola includes 14 monasteries in Spain, Italy, Mexico, and the Philippines.

=== Notable Minim nuns ===
A new community was established in Barcelona on Easter 1623. In 1936, the 25 members of the community in Barcelona were arrested by soldiers of the Republic of Spain. Charged with treason, nine choir nuns and an extern Sister were executed on July 23. They were beatified by Pope Francis on October 13, 2013, and are commemorated on July 23.

- Josefa Pilar García Solanas (María Montserrat)
- Ramona Ors Torrents (Margarida d'Alacoque of Saint Raymond)
- Dolors Vilaseca Gallego (Maria de l'Assumpciò)
- Mercè Mestre Trinché (Maria Mercè)
- Vicenta Jordá Martí (María de Jesús)
- Josepa Panyella Doménech (Josepa of the Heart of Mary)
- Teresa Ríus Casas (Trinitat)
- Maria Montserrat Ors Molist (Enriqueta)
- Ana Ballesta Gelmá (Filomena of Saint Francis de Paola)
- Lucrecia García Solanas

The Minim Daughters of Mary Immaculate is a separate institute founded in 1867 in Guanajuanto, Mexico, by Pablo de Anda Padilla. The sisters work in schools and medical centers in Mexico, Cuba, Ecuador, Rome, and Nogales, Arizona.

== Saints, Blesseds, and other holy people ==
Saints

- Francesco da Paola (27 March 1416 – 2 April 1507), founder of the order, canonized on 1 May 1519.
- Francis de Sales (21 August 1567 – 28 December 1622), tertiary, Bishop of Geneva, and Doctor of the Church, canonized on 8 April 1665.
- Vincent de Paul (24 April 1581 – 27 September 1660), tertiary and founder of the Congregation of the Mission, canonized on 16 June 1737.
- Nicola Saggio da Longobardi (6 January 1650 – 3 February 1709), professed religious, canonized on 23 November 2014.

Blesseds

- Thomas Felton (c. 1566 – 28 August 1588), Martyr of the English Reformation, beatified on 15 December 1929.
- Gaspar de Bono i Montso (5 January 1530 – 14 July 1604), priest, beatified on 10 September 1786.
- Nicholas Barré (21 October 1621 – 31 May 1686), founder of the Sisters of the Infant Jesus, beatified on 7 March 1999.
- Charles-Louis Hurtrel (c. 1760 – 2 September 1792), Martyr of the French Revolution, beatified on 17 October 1926
- Francesco Faa de Bruno (7 March 1825 – 25 March 1888), priest, mathematician and founder of the Minim Sisters of Our Lady of Suffrage, beatified on 25 September 1988.
- Maria Anna Rosa (Maria Margherita) Caiani (2 November 1863 – 8 August 1921), founder of the Minim Sisters of the Sacred Heart, beatified on 3 April 1989.
- María Montserrat García Solanas and 8 Companions (died 23 July 1936), Martyrs of the Spanish Civil War, beatified on 13 October 2013.
- Elena Aiello (10 April 1895 – 19 June 1961), founder of the Minim Sisters of the Passion of Our Lord Jesus Christ, beatified on 14 September 2011.

Venerables

- Eleonora Ramirez Montalvo Landi (6 July 1602 – 10 August 1659), widow and founder of the Minim Sisters Handmaids of the Holy Trinity, declared Venerable on 8 May 1987
- Bernardo Maria Clausi (26 November 1789 – 20 December 1849), priest, declared Venerable on 11 December 1987.
- Teodora Campostrini (26 October 1788 – 22 May 1860), founder of the Minim Sisters of Charity of Our Lady of Sorrows, declared Venerable on 3 March 2016.
- Filomena Ferrer Galcerán of Saint Columba (3 April 1841 – 13 August 1868), professed religious, declared Venerable on 7 September 1989
- Pablo de Anda Padilla (5 July 1830 – 29 June 1904), founder of the Minim Daughters of Mary Immaculate, declared Venerable on 28 June 1999.
- María Consuelo of the Immaculate Heart of Mary (Consuelo Utrilla Lozano) (6 September 1925 – 9 December 1956), professed religious, declared Venerable on 15 December 1994.
- Pio (Stanislao) Dellepiane (4 January 1904 – 12 December 1976), priest, declared Venerable on 19 May 2018.

Servants of God

- Diana de Filpo (28 August 1677 – 22 May 1722), tertiary
- María Claudia Josefa (María del Socorro) de Astorga Liceras (30 October 1769 – 31 March 1814), professed religious, declared as a Servant of God in 2019.
- Maria (Maria Raffaella) de Giovanna (31 July 1870 – 11 March 1933), founder of the Minim Sisters of Saint Francis da Paola, declared as a Servant of God on 11 December 2012.
