= Francis of Paola =

Italian mendicant friar (1416–1507)

Saint Francis of Paola O.M.
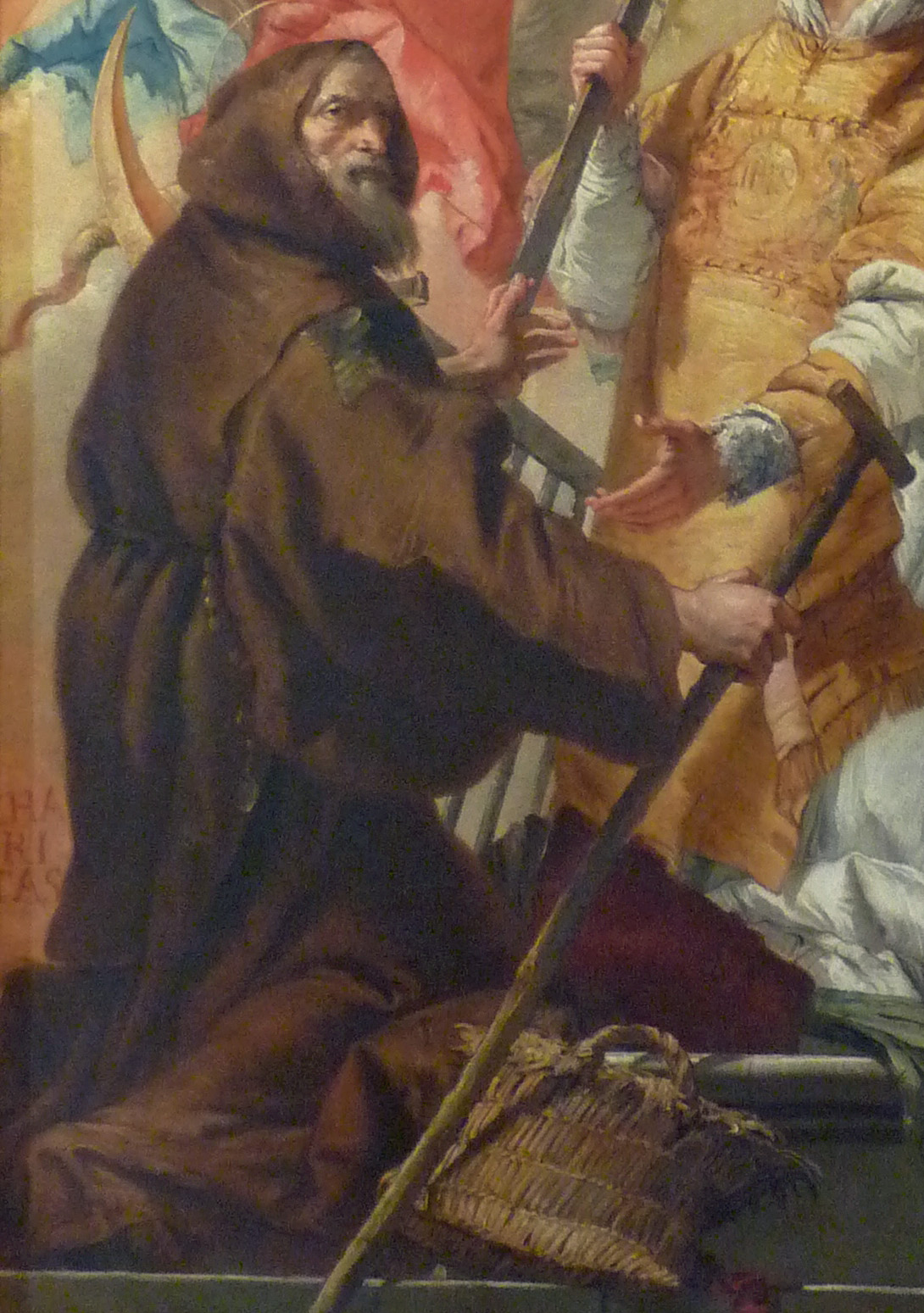
- Francis by Giovanni Domenico Tiepolo, from the altarpiece The Immaculate Conception with Saint Lawrence and Saint Francis of Paola

Hermit of St Francis, Confessor
- Born: 27 March 1416; Paola, Calabria Citeriore, Kingdom of Naples
- Died: 2 April 1507 (aged 91); Plessis-lez-Tours, Touraine, Kingdom of France
- Venerated in: Catholic Church
- Beatified: 1 November 1518
- Canonized: 1 May 1519 by Pope Leo X
- Feast: 2 April
- Patronage: Patron saint of Calabria; Paola, Calabria, Corigliano-Rossano, Altomonte, Botricello, Paterno Calabro, Sicily, Stornarella, San Fili, the former Kingdom of the Two Sicilies; co-patron saint of Naples, Cosenza, Castrovillari, Bitonto, Castelleone di Suasa, Castrolibero, Luzzi, and of Bisignano; Amato; La Chorrera, Panama; Mabini, Batangas; boatmen, mariners, and naval officers, Caxangá, Pernambuco, Brazil.

Francis of Paola, O.M. (also known as Francis the Fire Handler; 27 March 1416 – 2 April 1507), was a Catholic friar from the town of Paola in Calabria who founded the Order of Minims. He was named after Francis of Assisi and like him—but unlike most founders of men's religious orders—Francis of Paola was never ordained a priest.

== Birth and early life ==
Around 1416, Francis was born in the town of Paola in the southern Italian province of Cosenza, Calabria. Paola was a small town near the Tyrrhenian Sea, midway from Naples to Reggio. His parents were very poor but worked hard. They were pious: God's love and doing His will was their single-minded desire, and all they strove for. They had lived together several years without a child. It is said that they earnestly beseeched God, through the intercession of St Francis of Assisi, for a son. They vowed to direct him to God's service, so that in due course he might serve Him and become an instrument to glorify His name. A while later a son was born. The parents saw this as prayer answered and named him after St Francis. Two other children were eventually born to them.

When still in the cradle, Francis suffered from a swelling which endangered the sight of one of his eyes. His parents again had recourse to St Francis of Assisi. They made a vow that their son should pass an entire year wearing the "little habit" of St Francis in one of the friaries of his Order, a common practice in the Middle Ages. The child subsequently recovered. His parents seem to have made every effort to inspire Francis with pious sentiments, and to provide for him a suitable religious education. As a child, Francis duly showed a preference for abstinence, solitude and prayer.

In his thirteenth year, Francis was placed in the convent of Franciscan friars at San Marco Argentano, 42 km from his home. This was the Conventual Complex of the Friars Minor at San Marco Argentano, one of the oldest Franciscan buildings in Calabria, thought to have been founded around 1284 by Pietro Cathin who was a disciple and companion of St Francis of Assisi.

At the convent, Francis learned to read. It is said that from that time, he abstained from wearing linen or eating meat. Albeit not yet professed in the Order, he was apparently already outdoing the friars themselves in his scrupulously observing the Rule. After a year at the convent, he went with his parents on a pilgrimage to the Portiuncula at Assisi, and thence to Rome.

On arriving back home, he opted to withdraw, with his parents' consent, to live in solitude about half a mile from the town. To avoid being distracted by visits, he moved shortly thereafter to a more remote retreat in a rock corner on the coast, where he made himself a cave. Here he remained alone for about six years, devoting himself to prayer and self-mortification. When he shut himself up in this hermitage, in 1432, Francis was barely age fifteen. He had no bed other than bare rock itself, nor any food other than herbs gathered in a nearby wood, or what sometimes arrived with a visit from a friend.

== Confraternity ==
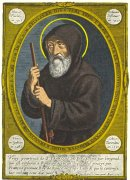
Francis of Paola, painting by Jean Bourdichon, 1507.

Francis was twenty when he was joined by two other devoutly inclined persons, who joined him in his holy exercises. To accommodate them Francis caused three cells and a chapel to be built by people of the vicinity. The three sang the divine praises every day in the chapel, where Mass used to be celebrated by a priest coming up from the parish church.

1436 marked the beginning of the religious order Francis was to found: the Hermits of Saint Francis of Assisi. Within seventeen years their numbers had grown. By the end of 1454, sanctioned by Pyrrhus (Petrus) Caracciolo, Archbishop of Cosenza, Francis built a large monastery and church. This project triggered an outburst of enthusiasm and devotion toward Francis from the people in the countryside around; even members of the local nobility carried stones and joined in. People's devotion deepened on hearing of miracles, in answer to prayer, attributed to Francis' intercession. One example was highlighted when someone, on oath, contributed to the subsequent canonisation process: through Francis' intercession, he was prepared to swear, a painful lame thigh had instantly healed.

As the life of Francis personified, humility was to become the most distinguishing hallmark of the religious brethren. Extraordinary severity characterised the self-denial in the rule of life adopted by Francis and his confrères. In his view, heroic self-mortification was a necessary means to spiritual growth. He and his companions were to seek to live unknown and hidden from the world. Freely undertaken were the Evangelical counsels of poverty, chastity and obedience, traditional among mendicant Catholic religious orders since the days of St Francis of Assisi, more than two centuries earlier. To this, Francis of Paola added a "fourth vow": by the 15th century, there had been a decline in the custom of fasting during Lent. Reviving this observance, Francis hoped, might follow his imposing on himself and his companions an unbroken, year-round abstinence from meat and other animal products.

The community was still composed entirely of laymen, with only a few who could read or write. To inspect the confraternity at Paola, Pope Paul II sent an emissary in 1467. This was a priest and jurist, Baltasar de Spigno (known also as Baldassarre de Gutrossis, or Balthasar de Spino). At first Francis was reproached for undue austerity, its being supposedly rustic and not for the educated or well-bred. However, Baltasar appears to have been won over; Francis' general approach was accepted within the year. So that they could obtain essentials, and preserve their buildings, papal indulgences were forthcoming.

In 1470 Baltasar joined the brethren. For them to be officially approved, he approached Archbishop Caracciolo. This request was welcomed, and on 30 November 1470 Caracciolo promulgated Decet nos, wherein authority over Francis' confraternity was renounced by the archbishop and placed directly with the Holy See. So as to be recognised by Rome, the confraternity was helped by Baltasar's advocacy in front of the pope. In the bull Sedes apostolica (17 May 1474) Pope Sixtus IV recognised the Congregation of Hermits of Saint Francis of Assisi in the Territory of Padua, in which the members chose to live in a permanent Lenten manner. The document granted them the same rights as the mendicant friars and Francis was named their superior general. The document empowered them to write a rule for their community and to assume the title of Hermits of San Francisco.

== Minims ==
This rule was formally approved by Pope Alexander VI, who, however, changed its title to Minims, the Order to be the Minim friars, i.e. the "least of all the faithful".

Francis was invited to found new communities in Calabria. In 1472 he acquired some land for the construction of a monastery in Paterno Cálabro. He then founded the monasteries of Spezzano della Sila (1474), Corigliano Calabro (1476) and Crotona, the latter being in charge of Brother Paolo Rendacio. In March 1464 Francis left Paterno Calabro for Milazzo, on the island of Sicily, to found another monastery. In April of that year the miracle of the Strait of Messina occurred: the religious man, with two of his disciples, wanted to take a boat to cross the strait but the boatman rejected him because he had no money, so he put his cloak on the sea and The three crossed the strait on it. For this reason, Pius XII named him patron of the seafarers of Italy on March 27, 1943.[9]

Francis also preached about conversion. He told a person whose paralyzed hand had been cured, "Go, sweep your house, that is, your conscience, and be a good Christian."[12] He once cured a man with a paralyzed arm with some herbs.

There was only one priest, Balthasar de Spino, doctor of Laws, and who was later appointed confessor to Innocent VIII. Francis founded another religious house at Paterno, on the Gulf of Taranto. There was a third house founded at Spezzano in 1474. Further foundations were at Corigliano and what was, in those days, called Cotrone.

In 1474 Pope Sixtus IV gave Francis permission to write a rule for his community, and to adopt the title of Hermits of St Francis. This rule was formally approved by Pope Alexander VI, who changed their name to "Minims". His religious order having been sanctioned, Francis founded several new monasteries in Calabria and Sicily. He also established convents of nuns, and, following St Francis of Assisi's lead, a third order for persons wishing to follow his rule but not living apart from the world.

Francis did not defer to a person's worldly rank or position. He rebuked the King of Naples for his ill-doing; as a result he suffered persecution.

== France ==
When King Louis XI of France was terminally ill, he sent an embassy to Calabria to beg Francis to visit him. Francis refused, until the pope finally ordered him to go. Embarking at Ostia, he landed in France. Many people sick from the plague then afflicting Provence are said to have been cured by his intercession as he passed through that region. Francis travelled to the king's residence, the Château de Plessis-lez-Tours (now within the village of La Riche), and was with him as he died.

He became a tutor to Louis's heir, Charles VIII, who kept him at court, frequently asked him for advice and built a monastery for the Minims near the chateau at Plessis and another on the Pincian Hill in Rome. Francis influenced many figures in the French church, particularly Jan Standonck, who founded the Collège de Montaigu along what he thought were Minimist lines. Charles VIII's high esteem for Francis was shared by Louis XII when he ascended to the throne in 1498. Francis was now eager to return to Italy but - like Charles - Louis was loath to lose him as an advisor and insisted he stayed in France.

Francis never did leave France, spending his last three months in complete solitude preparing for his death. On Holy Thursday of 1507 he gathered his community around him and exhorted them especially to have mutual charity amongst themselves. He urged them not to relax the rigour of their life, in particular perpetual abstinence from meat and other animal products. The next day, Good Friday, he again assembled them all, gave them his last instructions and appointed a Vicar General. He died at Plessis on 2 April 1507 at the age of ninety-one.

== Diet ==
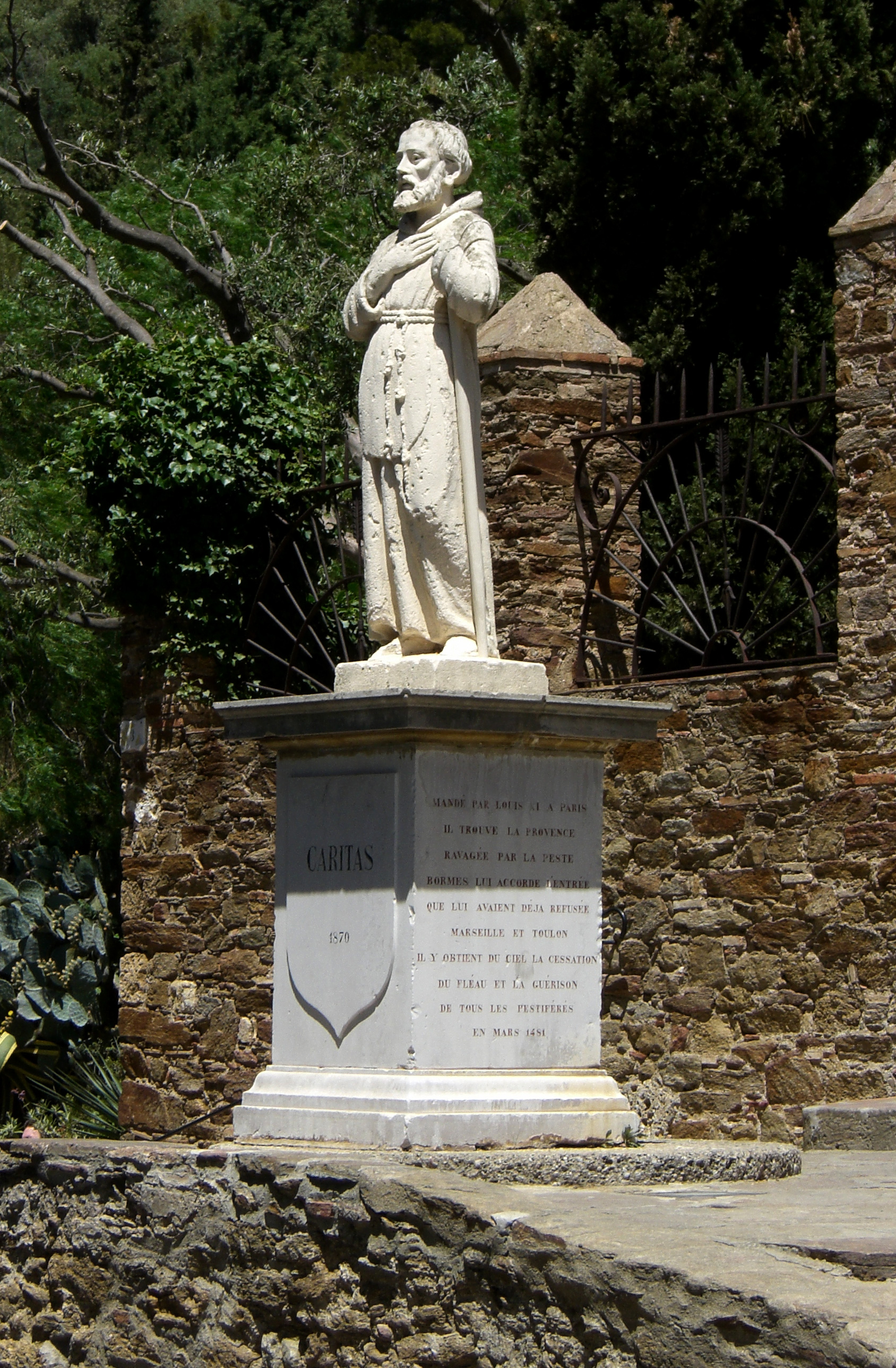
St Francis of Paola, Bormes-les-Mimosas, France.

Francis followed a diet not only free from animal flesh, but also from all animal-derived foods, such as eggs and dairy products. Francis has been described as a vegan.

From its founding, this order became known for two major charisms: humility and non-violence. "Minim" implies living as the smallest or least, or embracing humility, simplicity and frugality. Expressed through avoiding harm to any creature is the call to non-violence and repudiation of cruelty.

== Gift of prophecy ==
It was believed that Francis had the gift of prophecy. The taking of Constantinople by the Turks was apparently foretold by him, not only to several persons but also on more than one occasion: 1447, 1448 and 1449. On 29 May 1453 the city was conquered under the command of Mehmed II. Constantine Palaiologos XI, the last Christian emperor of Constaninople, was killed in battle.

Theodoor van Thulden painted a mystic episode that was said to have occurred over a century earlier. It depicts Francis of Paola, who was revered in France because he visited the country in 1482, at the bedside of Louise of Savoy to announce that she will give birth to the next king of France, the future Francis I. In 1515, King Louis XII died without a male heir and the throne went to Francis I, of the royal family's Valois-Angoulême branch. Louise of Savoy and her spouse, the Count of Angoulême, who is almost certainly the figure depicted to the left of the bed, decided to name the child Francis in honor of the saint.

== Legends ==
According to a famous story, in the year 1464, he was refused passage by a boatman while trying to cross the Strait of Messina to Sicily. He reportedly laid his cloak on the water, tied one end to his staff as a sail, and sailed across the strait with his companions following in the boat. The second of Franz Liszt's "Legendes" (for solo piano) describes this story in music.

After his nephew died, the boy's mother—Francis' own sister—appealed to Francis for comfort, and filled his apartment with lamentations. After the Mass and divine office had been said for the repose of his soul, Francis ordered the corpse to be carried from the church into his cell, where he continued praying until, to her astonishment, the boy's life was restored and Francis presented him to his mother in perfect health. The young man entered his order and is the celebrated Nicholas Alesso who afterwards followed his uncle to France, and was famous for sanctity and many great actions.

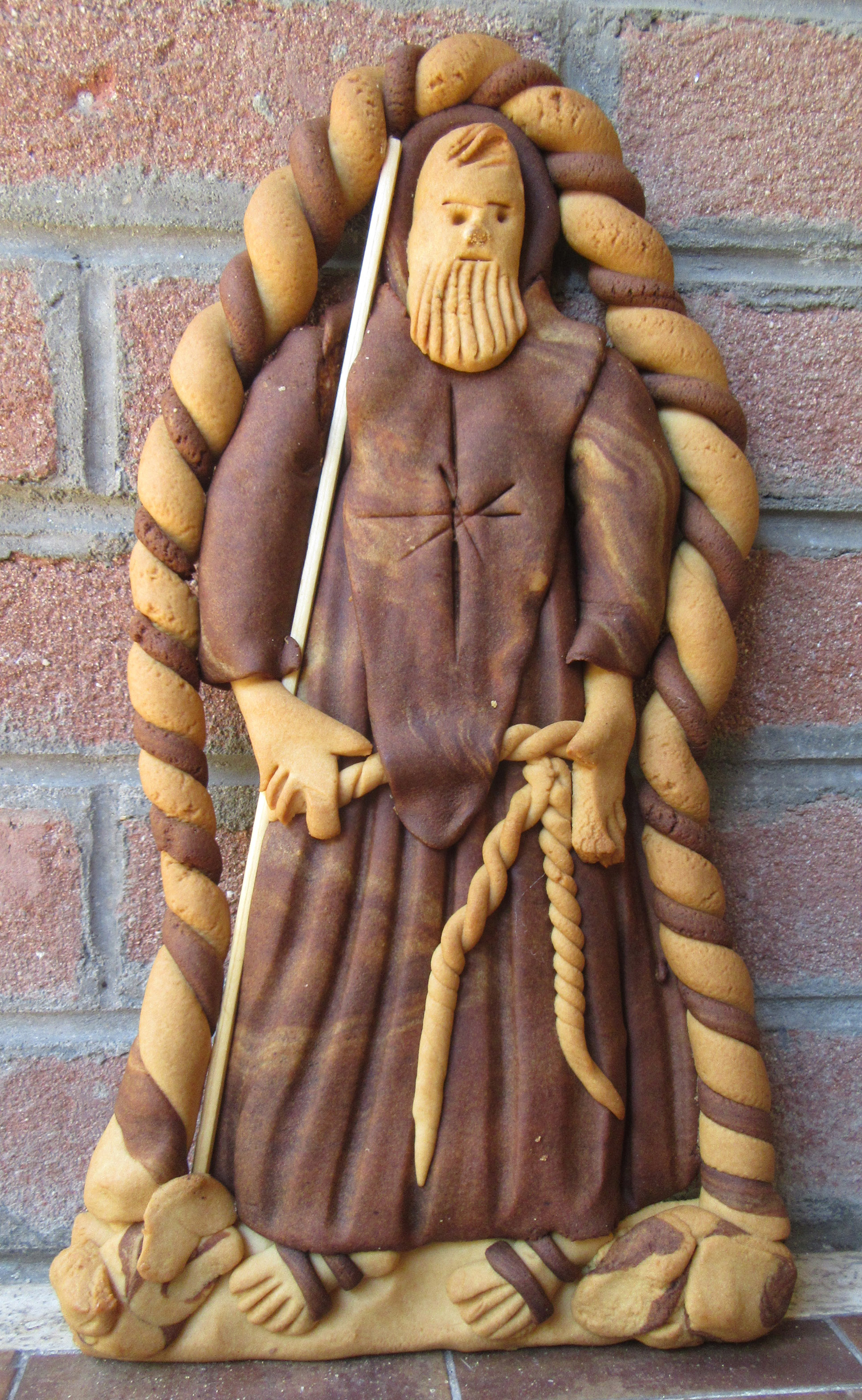
Saint Francis of Paola, in form of 'Nzuddha, typical honey calabrian cake

There are several stories about his compassion for animals, and how he gave back life to animals that were killed to be eaten. For example, a biographer writes:

"Francis had a favorite trout that he called 'Antonella'. One day, one of the priests, who provided religious services, saw the trout swimming about in his pool. To him it was just a delicious dish, so he caught it and took it home, tossing it into the frying pan. Francis missed 'Antonella' and realized what had happened. He asked one of his followers to go to the priest to get it back. The priest, annoyed by this great concern for a mere fish, threw the cooked trout on the ground, shattering it into several pieces. The hermit sent by Francis gathered up the broken pieces in his hands and brought them back to Francis. Francis placed the pieces back in the pool and, looking up to Heaven and praying, said: 'Antonella, in the name of Charity, return to life.' The trout immediately became whole and swam joyously around his pool as if nothing had happened. The friars and the workers who witnessed this miracle were deeply impressed by the miracle."

Francis also raised his pet lamb from the dead after it had been killed and eaten by workmen. Being in need of food, the workmen caught and slaughtered Francis' pet lamb, Martinello, roasting it in their lime kiln. They were eating when Francis approached them, looking for the lamb. They told him they had eaten it, having no other food. He asked what they had done with the fleece and the bones. They told him they had thrown them into the furnace. Francis walked over to the furnace, looked into the fire and called "Martinello, come out!" The lamb jumped out, completely untouched, bleating happily on seeing his master.

Francis of Paola called the animals by their names even after their lives had ended. He apparently believed they continued to exist after their deaths.

== Legacy and veneration ==
Pope Leo X canonized him in 1519. He is considered to be a patron saint of boatmen, mariners, and naval officers. His liturgical feast day is celebrated by the Catholic Church on April 2, the day on which he died. In 1963, Pope John XXIII designated him as the patron saint of Calabria. Though his miracles were numerous, he was canonized for his humility and discernment in blending the contemplative life with the active one.

The Order of Minims does not seem at any time to have been very extensive, but they had houses in many countries. The definitive rule was approved in 1506 by Pope Julius II, who also approved a rule for the nuns of the Order. A Third Order of their movement was also approved. The most noted member of this Order was the illustrious French bishop, Francis de Sales. Although the Minim order lost many of its monasteries in the 18th century during the French Revolution, it continues to exist, primarily in Italy.

In 1562, a group of Protestant Huguenots in France broke open his tomb and found Francis' body incorrupt. They dragged it forth, burned it and scattered the bones, which were recovered by Catholic faithful and distributed as relics to various churches of his order.

A walk, The Way of the Young Man has been devised between San Marco Argentano and Paola. Another one, The hermit's way, starts at the Sanctuary of St Francis of Paola in Paterno Calabro and ends at Paola.

== See also ==
- San Francesco di Paola, Naples

== Sources and external links ==
- Francis of Paola—Online entry at Catholic.org
- Herbert Thurston, The Physical Phenomena of Mysticism, pp. 174–75
- Founder Statue in St Peter's Basilica
- Colonnade Statue in St Peter's Square
