= Palazzo De Stefani =

Building in Alcamo, Italy

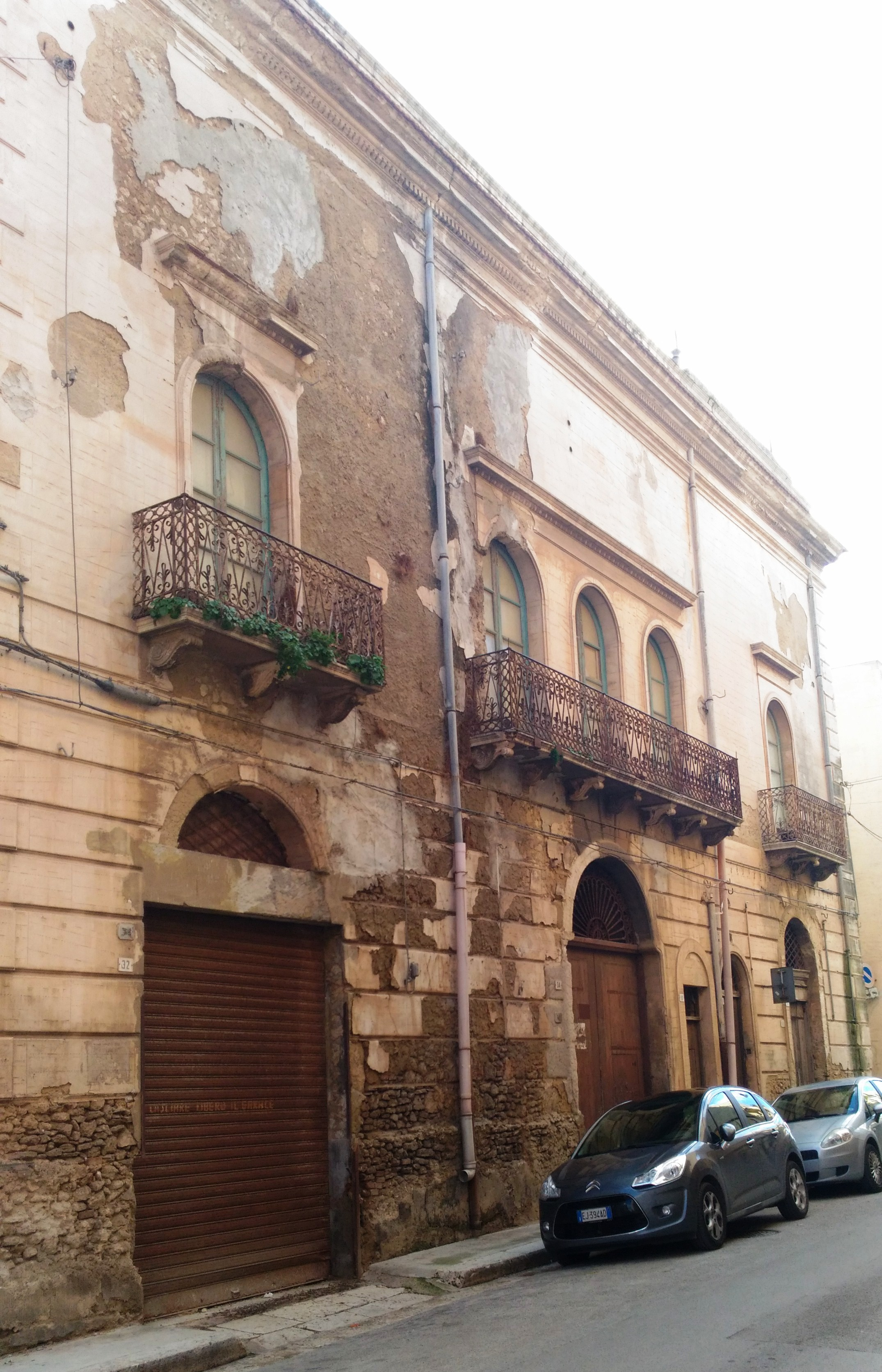
- Interactive map of the Palazzo De Stefani area

General information
- Architectural style: Liberty style
- Location: Alcamo, Italy
- Coordinates: 37°58′49″N 12°58′06″E
- Construction started: 16th century
- Client: De Stefani family

Palazzo De Stefani is an ancient residential building located in Alcamo, in the province of Trapani.

== History ==
The palace was built in the 16th century and rebuilt in the 19th; inside it there was a court yard which, through a gateway, led into the presumed house belonging to the poet Sebastiano Bagolino.

== Description ==
The façade was entirely restored: on the ground floor there are five doors, the main one has a circular arch surmounting a thick portal, with a wrought-iron lunette; on the first floor there are three wrought-iron balconies, with slight lintels, having a stone gallery and corbels and some rinceaus. The façade is completed by the eaves, with a denticular cornice at its basis.

Giuseppe Polizzi, referring to the old construction, writes:

Casa Di Stefano opposite to Badia Nuova. On the ground floor a door with a circular arch and gothic shape around it, extending as far as the foot. On the first floor two windows with slight lintels, shaped imposts and small corbels at the corners; a third one without shapes. These windows are leaning on a gothic small cornice which runs all over the façade and that protrudes over small corbels, having the shape of an octagonal overturned pyramid under the settings of the three windows above. The top floor is enlightened by a gallery with small windows and circular arches made with bricks. Except for these, the imposts and the small cornice realized with cut stone, all the other things are of uncertain work. '

And also:

'The owner, in order to make the interior accessible to carriages, has already demolished the doorpost and, as he wants to add some protruding balconies, is going to demolish those of the windows and the small cornices; however, he promises he will apply the imposts in some inner spaces.

== Sources ==
- Roberto Calia: I Palazzi dell'aristocrazia e della borghesia alcamese; Alcamo, Carrubba, 1997
- P.M. Rocca: di alcuni antichi edifici di Alcamo; Palermo, tip. Castellana-Di Stefano, 1905
- Giuseppe Polizzi: I monumenti di antichità e d'arte della provincia di Trapani; Trapani, Giovanni Modica Romano, 1879, p. 63
