= The Immaculate Conception with Saint Lawrence and Saint Francis of Paola =

Painting by Giovanni Domenico Tiepolo

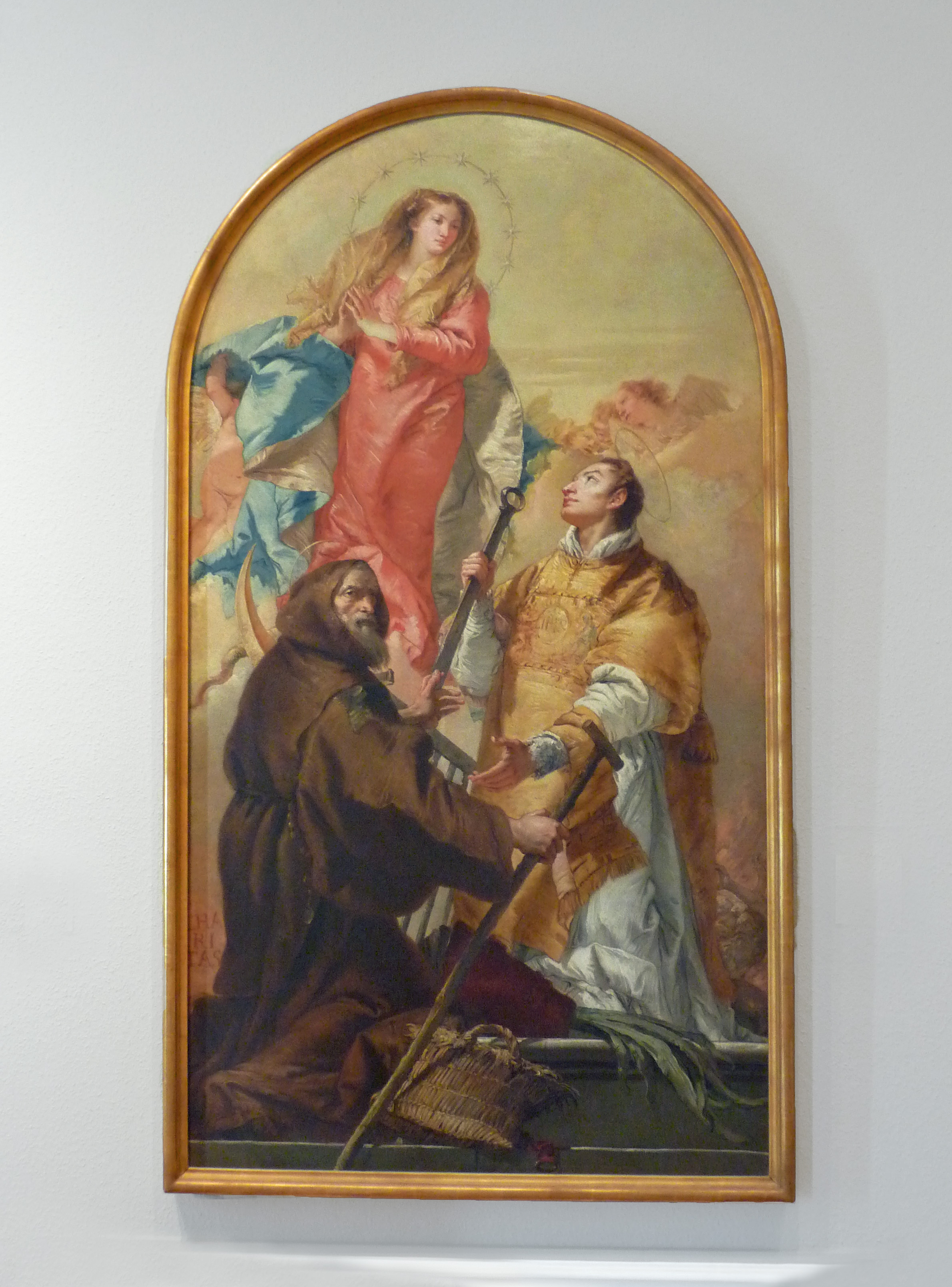
- Artist: Giovanni Domenico Tiepolo
- Year: early 1770s
- Medium: oil painting on canvas
- Movement: Rococo; Catholic art
- Subject: Immaculate Conception; Saint Lawrence; Francis of Paola
- Dimensions: 220 cm × 119 cm (87 in × 47 in)
- Location: Musée des Beaux-Arts, Strasbourg
- Accession: 1900

The Immaculate Conception with Saint Lawrence and Saint Francis of Paola is an oil on canvas altarpiece by the Italian Rococo painter Giovanni Domenico Tiepolo. It is on display in the Musée des Beaux-Arts of Strasbourg, France. Its inventory number is 435.

The painting depicts Mary, mother of Jesus as the Immaculata, appearing to Saint Lawrence, who gazes at her, and to Francis of Paola, who looks at the viewer while pointing his left hand towards the apparition. Owing to its flamboyant virtuosity and its expressiveness, the work has long been thought to have been painted by Giovanni Domenico's father, Giovanni Battista, but since 1939, it is accepted as an early masterpiece by the younger Tiepolo. On account of the stylistic resemblances with Giovanni Battista's paintings, it is thought that it was painted shortly after his death, i.e. 1770, when Giovanni Domenico was still carrying his father's mantle while beginning to develop his own, more realistic and even naturalistic style (here visible in the trompe-l'œil basket at the lower edge of the painting).

The painting was bought in 1898 by Wilhelm von Bode from the Florentine art dealer Elia Volpi, and entered the collections in 1900. Between 1810 and 1879, it had belonged to the parish church of Cavenzano, Chiesa di Santa Maria Assunta (Cavenzano), now part of the commune of Campolongo Tapogliano, where it was replaced by a faithful copy. Before that, it had belonged to the Dominican monastery of Aiello del Friuli. But it is not documented if the altarpiece was painted for that institution or, for that matter, who commissioned it.
