= Sebastiano Bagolino =

Italian Latin poet

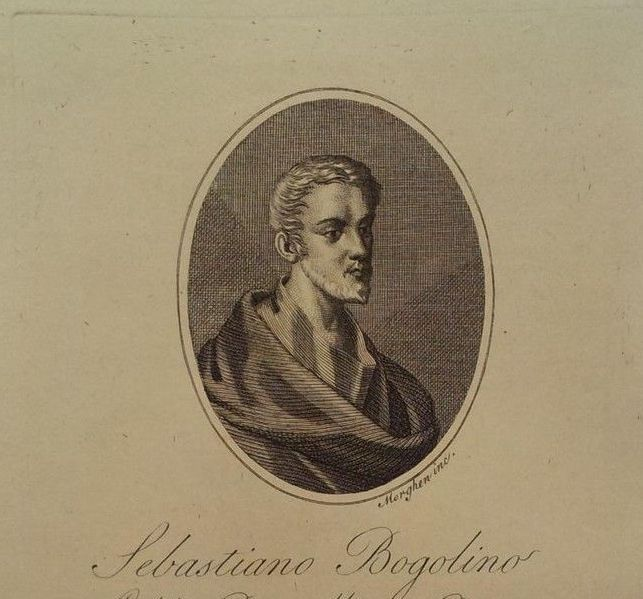
- Born: 25 March 1562; Alcamo, province of Trapani
- Died: 26 July 1604 (aged 42); Alcamo
- Occupations: Scholar, poet
- Spouse: Francesca Battiata (m. 1592)
- Children: 2
- Writing career
- Period: Renaissance

Sebastiano Bagolino (25 March 1562 – 26 July 1604) was a Latin poet and scholar.

== Biography ==
He was born in Alcamo, in the province of Trapani, from Giovan Leonardo, a painter, and Caterina Tabone. His father, probably native of Verona, painted several frescoes for the churches in Alcamo. His mother came from a family quite rich and that gave the poet a fairly comfortable life.

When a child he was introduced to painting and music, but he had a real aptitude for humanities: he studied letters and poetics with the famous poet and jurisconsult Marco Gentilucci from Spoleto who had com to Alcamo by chance and covered several important offices from 1576 to 1594. Bagolino's natural ability in writing Latin lines procured him the admittance, even very young, into the house of Francesco Moncada, prince of Paternò, patron of several literates and whom he dedicated various works to. However, when he was only 19, his will to enter a more open cultural circle, brought him to move to Naples, the centre of humanistic studies of that period.

He taught poetics to the young sons of noble families and got the protection of Ferrante Carafa, whose son he was the educator; he also devoted himself to the study of rhetoric under the guide of Ascanio Vopisco, soon succeeding in writing and speaking Latin, Italian and Spanish perfectly well here and to read out lines, so earning the esteem of several literary men, especially from leading figures like Giovanbattista La Porta.

Bagolino studied humanistic poets, but as he did not feel amalgamated from the intellectual point of view, he went back to Palermo, under the protection of Francesco Moncada, prince of Paternò again.

He put his knowledge on painting and music at Moncada's disposal, accompanying him on his frequent trips to his estates: to Caltanissetta, Adernò, Siracusa, Militello, until he had a quarrel with Monacada's mother, Aloisa Luna.

In 1592 Moncada died and Bagolino decided to return to Alcamo where, on 7 August 1593, he married Francesca Battiata, probably a writer. He became a brotherly friend with Annibale Valguarnera, baron of Godrano, a patron of several literates, but this possibility of support failed too, and he opened a private school of grammar with pupils like Giuseppe Grimaldi, Vincenzo and Niccolò Odaglia, poets and literates.

At the same time he painted and gave lessons of painting and music, until 1595 when he had the proposal to translate the Emblemas morales of the bishop Giovanni Orozco. Bagolino moved to Agrigento and started a familiar relationship with him, but even this time the friendship broke because of some disagreements of literary type.

Returned to his town, he was forced to work for his living, and in 1598 he was called as a teacher at the public Gymnasium, though this activity did not give the right satisfaction, it gave him the possibility of earning his living and, in spite of the engagement in his work, he continued to devote himself to his great passion: poetry. In 1604 he wrote his last verses, and on 26 July the poet died at the early age of 42, without publishing his poems.

After his solemn funeral, Bagolino’s mortal remains were buried in the Church of the Holy Crucifix (or saint Francis of Paola) in Alcamo; inside it, there is a memorial stone, with the epitaph that the poet himself had written before his death:

Tu quicumque mei ferris per saxa sepulcri,
Attonitus lacrymes non rogo morte mea;
Sed responsurae tantum iace verba favillae,
‘Et dicas : cinis hic num Bagolinus erat?

“You, whoever you are, will go among the stones of my sepulchre,
(I) astonished do not ask (you) tears for my death;
but only ashes can words to re-echo for a dead man,
and you might say: “was this ash by any chance Bagolino?”

Alcamo has entitled him the Civic Library, a lower secondary school and a large square. A marble bust, realized by Giuseppe Bambina (a sculptor from Alcamo), was first placed in the homonymous square, then moved into the near small garden and later, in 1941, as they created an air-raid shelter underground, (together with the bust of Girolamo Caruso) in the garden located in Piazza Pittore Renda. Finally, as it had been ruined by vandals, they destroyed it.

== Works ==
The best of Bagolino’s works is found in his 729 Latin poems, published in 1782 by Sir G.Triolo Galifi; they are collected in two volumes and can be consulted at the Civic Library in Alcamo. There are some with a religious and love theme and are full of fantasy and feeling; a third group is about events actually occurred in Alcamo and testified by the poet.

Here is the list:

- Sebastiani Bagolini Carmina: a collection
- Eulogy of Francesco Ventimiglia, marquess of Geraci.
- Libro sopra lo reggimento che fe’ ‘l Ventimiglia in Sicilia.
- A latin prose on the origin of the Moncada family.
- A book of Latin epigrams about the greatest figures of the Moncada Family.
- Opus lyricum, recalled in two letters that Bagolino sent to Valguarnera.
- A historical speech about the town of Alcamo.
- Epistolarum familiarium liber (containing letters to Cardinal Petrocchini).
- Version of Emblemas morales, lost except for some fragments.
- De ratione Emblematum, a work against Ambrogio Beneventano
- The Angelical Salutation, a series of religious works which include:

1.disegni di Christo (Christ’s plans) 2. The Salutation of Our Lady, that is Ave Maria. 3. A spiritual reasoning to Francesca Battiata 4. L'Anchore, a "spiritual reasoning" on the “ four anchores of the Evangelic perfection”

- Vita P. Thomae Schiphaldi
- Cornias, a book of unknown subject
- Six songs of Carnalà
- The Pinzochero, a writing against bad painters
- Paragrafi, against an ignorant painter
- Book of the Ephemeridi of Moncada
- Cruena, Epactaria, Malleus, Psittacus (satyrical compositions)
- Testamentum Bagolini ad Tertulliani exemplum.
- In the Selecta epigrammata they published five Bagolini Carmina, elegiae et poemata alíquot ex Catullo, Ovidio, Tibullo, Propertio aliisque antiquis et recentioribus poetis (Panormi 1656).
- The elegy Copa appeared in the tome XVIII of the Pamphlets of Sicilian authors in honour of the prince of Paternò (Palermo 1777, pp. 363 s.).
- Pub. Sebastiani Bagolini Carminum, edited by Giuseppe Triolo (Panormi 1782) in two volumes.
- La Piramide, ossia Dialogo di Sebastiano Bagolino Historico e Poeta alcamese sopra la Piramide fatta in Alcamo nell'Esequie di Filippo II Re di Spagna e di Sicilia, (a very pompous eulogy which describes a funerary monument which was erected for Filippo II In Alcamo).
- lo Stracciabisaccie (from the name of a villa belonging to Vincenzo Tornamira), a mixture of vernacular prose and poems.
- Sebastiani Bagolini Familiarium Epistolarum.
- Il Moncada di Seb. Bagolino Alcamese, a document of courtly custom.

Finally, in the sacristy of the Sanctuary of Madonna of Miracles, there is a monochrome drawing on canvas, made by Bagolino, depicting the founding of the fresco of Our Lady of Miracles, restored in 1947.

== Sources ==
- Mutini, Claudio (1963). "BAGOLINO, Sebastiano". Dizionario Biografico degli Italiani (in Italian). Vol. 5: Bacca–Baratta. Rome: Institute of the Italian Encyclopaedia. OCLC 883370.
- Amico Ugo Antonio: Sebastiano Bagolino, poeta latino del sec. XVI, per Ugo Antonio Amico; Palermo, B. Virzi,1874
- Peritore Carmina Caterina: Sebastiano Bagolino umanista e poeta siciliano del XVI secolo; Publisicula, 2004
- Amatus J. M.: Vita Sebastiani Bagolini; Alcamo, ed.Bibl. Com.
- Carlo Cataldo: Lo scultore alcamese Giuseppe Bambina; Alcamo, Graficamente; 2014
- De Blasi Ignazio: Discorso dell'opulenta città di Alcamo; Palermo, A. Mongitore, Bibliotheca sicula, edition II,1708
- Mazzuchelli G. M.: Gli Scrittori d'Italia; Brescia, ed.II, 1758
- Lettera apologetica di Dafni Orinisio ad Olinto Drepaneo; Palermo, 1787
- Triolo Galifi G.: Osservazioni sopra le Memorie della vita e virtù del B. Arcangelo scritte dal Sac. D. Pietro Longo di Calatafimi; Palermo,1805
- Speciale G.: Lettera; Palermo; Giornale di Sicilia n.18; 2 dic. 1794
- Ortolani G. E.: Bibliografia degli uomini illustri di Sicilia; Napoli, ed.I,1817
- Di Giovanni Mira A.: Ragionamento su i migliori storici e poeti latini del sec. XVI in Sicilia; Palermo,1832
- Palazzotto B.: Notizie che riguardano alcuni manoscritti esistenti nella pubblica libreria del comune di Palermo, in Giorn. di scienze lettere e arti per la Sicilia; ed.LXI, 1838
- Di Giovanni V.: Degli scrittori siciliani omessi nella storia della letteratura italiana di Cesare Cantù, in Filologia e letteratura siciliana; Palermo; p. 323–343, ed.II, 1871
- Di Giovanni V.: I prosatori siciliani ne' due secoli XVI e XVII; Palermo p. 277-31
- Di Giovanni V.: Veronica Lazio poetessa alcamese creduta anteriore a Ciullo; Palermo, edition III, 1879 p. 242–245
- Di Giovanni V.: Tommaso Schifaldo umanista siciliano del sec. XV; Palermo, p. 246–251
- Di Giovanni V.: La libreria di S. B. e l'"Hortensius" di Cicerone nel 1597; Palermo p. 252–258
- Amico U. A.: S. B. poeta latino del sec. XVI; Palermo,1874
- Amico U. A.: S. B.Studio storico; Palermo, 1880
- F. M. Mirabella, Cenni degli alcamesi rinomati in scienze, lettere, arti, armi e santità, Alcamo, tip.Surdi & C., 1876.
- Mirabella F. M.: Di un codice autografo di S. B.; Nuove Effemeridi siciliane, ed. V, 1877 p. 34–54
- Mirabella F. M.: Marco Gentiluccio poeta italiano e latino del sec. XVI; editore Nuove Effemeridi siciliane, ed.VIII, 1878, p. 152–169
- Mirabella F. M.: Dodici epigrammi inediti di S. B. tratti da un manoscritto del suo tempo; ed.XI, 1881, p. 273–280
- Mirabella F. M.: Degli Emblemi Morali di Mons. Giovanni Orosco tradotti da S.B.: notizie e saggio; ed. XII, 1882, p. 269–284
- Mirabella F. M.: Di Leonardo Bagolino pittore del sec. XVI e di una sua tela esistente in Alcamo; in Archivio storico siciliano, n. s., ed.VI, 1882, p. 416–427
- Mirabella F. M.: Un documento che rischiara la prima stampa de' carmi di S.B.; editore Il Bibliofilo; ed.IV, 1883, p. 72–74
- Mirabella F. M.: Di alcuni disegni e dipinti del poeta S. B.; Arch. stor. siciliano, n. s.; ed. IX, 1884, p. 430–437
- Mirabella F. M.: S. B. poeta latino ed erudito del sec. XVI; ed. Arch. stor. siciliano, n. s., ed.XXXIII, XXXIV, XXXV, XXXVI, 1908, p. 105–266, 1909 p. 1–32, 1910 p. 1–32 e p. 245–292,1 911 p. 77–112, 396–430
- Evola F. Sopra un documento che rischiara l'edizione delle poesie di S. B. pubblicate in Palermo nei primi anni del sec. XVII; in Arch. stor. siciliano, n. s., 1883, p. 170–174; ed.VIII
- Evola F. Di alcune poesie inedite di S. B. |editore=Il Bibliofilo | città= | ed=II | anno=1881, p. 149–152
- Evola F.: Sulla stampa siciliana fuori di Palermo e di Messina nei sec. XVI e XVII; Palermo, 1885, p. 17–20
- Quinci G. B.: Lavori di G. L. B. nell'antico duomo di Mazara; in Arch. stor. sicil.; ed.XVI, 1938 p. 527 ss.
- Adragna D.: S. B. poeta alcamese del sec. XVI; Alcamo, 1932
- Vivona F.: S. B. poeta e umanista alcamese; Roma,1935
- G. Pipitone, Sebastiano Bagolino: carmi d'amore, Palermo, Nuova Ipsa, 2012.
- Salvatore Messina, Alcamo nella storia, nella leggenda e nell'arte; Alcamo, ed. Campo, 2015
