= Giovanni Domenico Tiepolo =

Italian painter

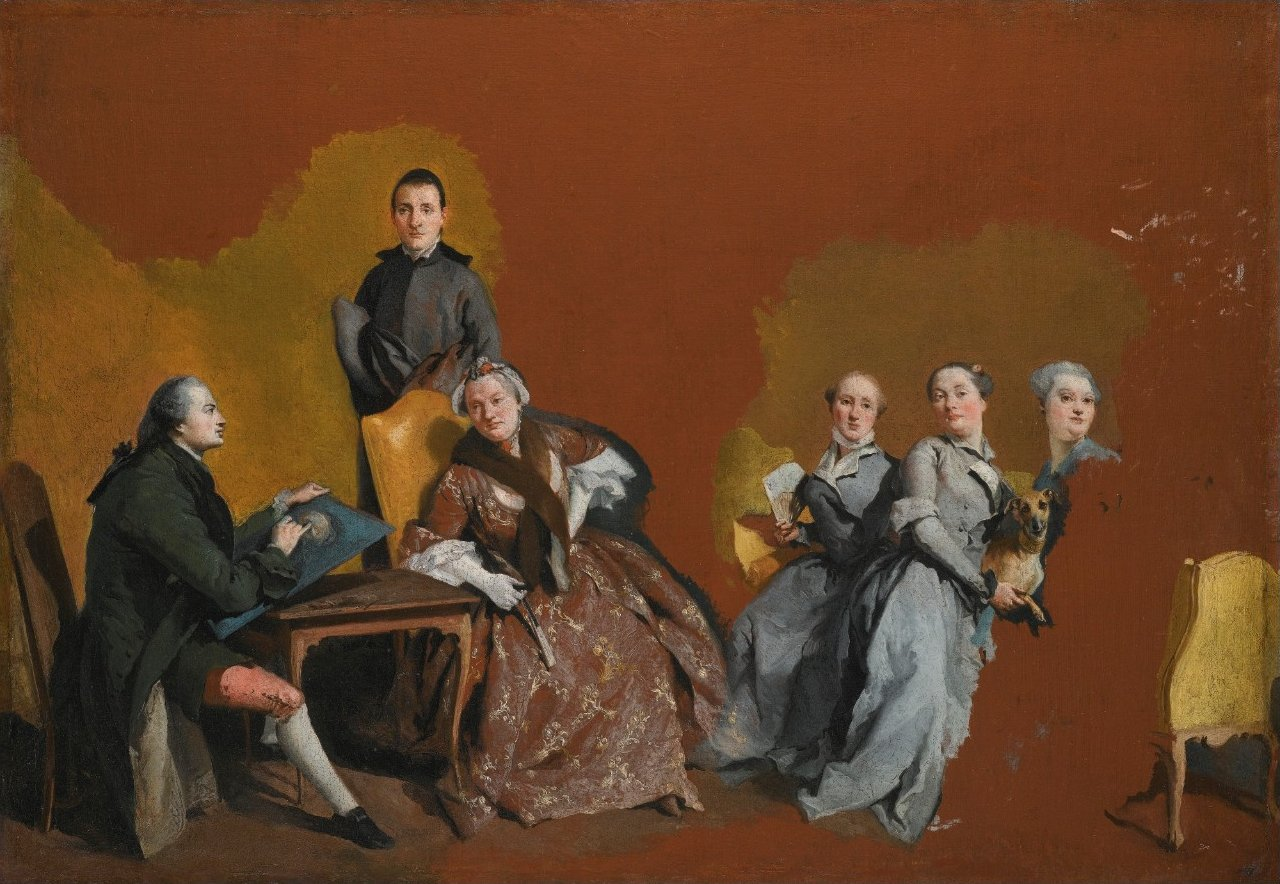
The artist's family, a rare portrait, unfinished.

Giovanni Domenico Tiepolo (August 30, 1727 – March 3, 1804) was an Italian painter and printmaker in etching. He was the son of artist Giovanni Battista Tiepolo and elder brother of Lorenzo Baldissera Tiepolo.

== Life history ==
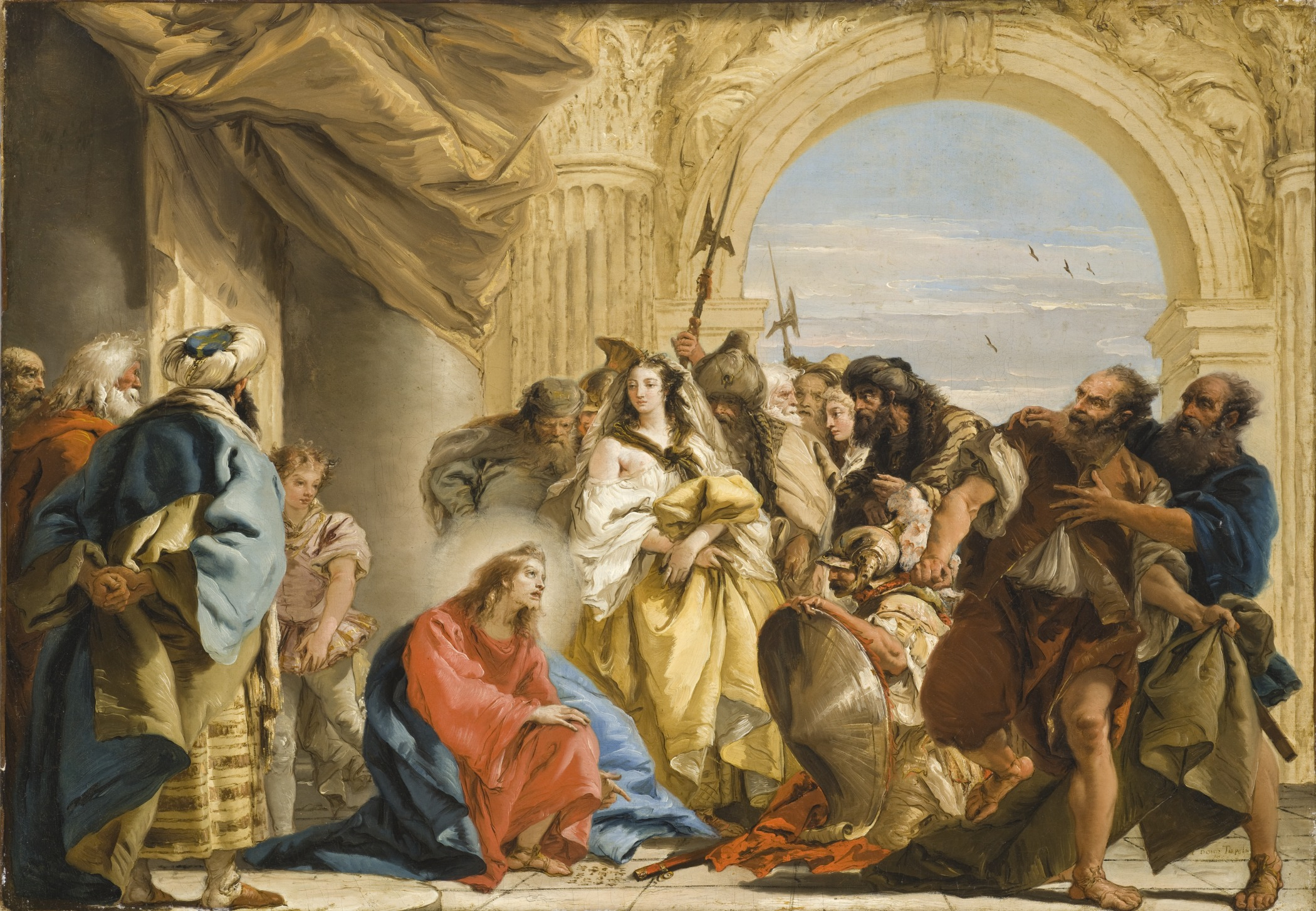
Christ and the Woman Taken in Adultery, 1752, 28.6″ (72.7 cm) X 41.2″ (104.7 cm)

Domenico was born in Venice, studied under his father, and by the age of 13 was the elder Tiepolo's chief assistant. He was one of the many assistants, including his brother Lorenzo, who transferred the designs of his father (often executed in oil sketches). By the age of 20, he was producing his own work for commissioners.

He assisted his father in Würzburg 1751–3, decorating the famous stairwell fresco, in Vicenza at the Villa Valmarana ai Nani in 1757, and at the Royal Palace of Madrid for Charles III of Spain from 1762 to 1770.

== Works ==
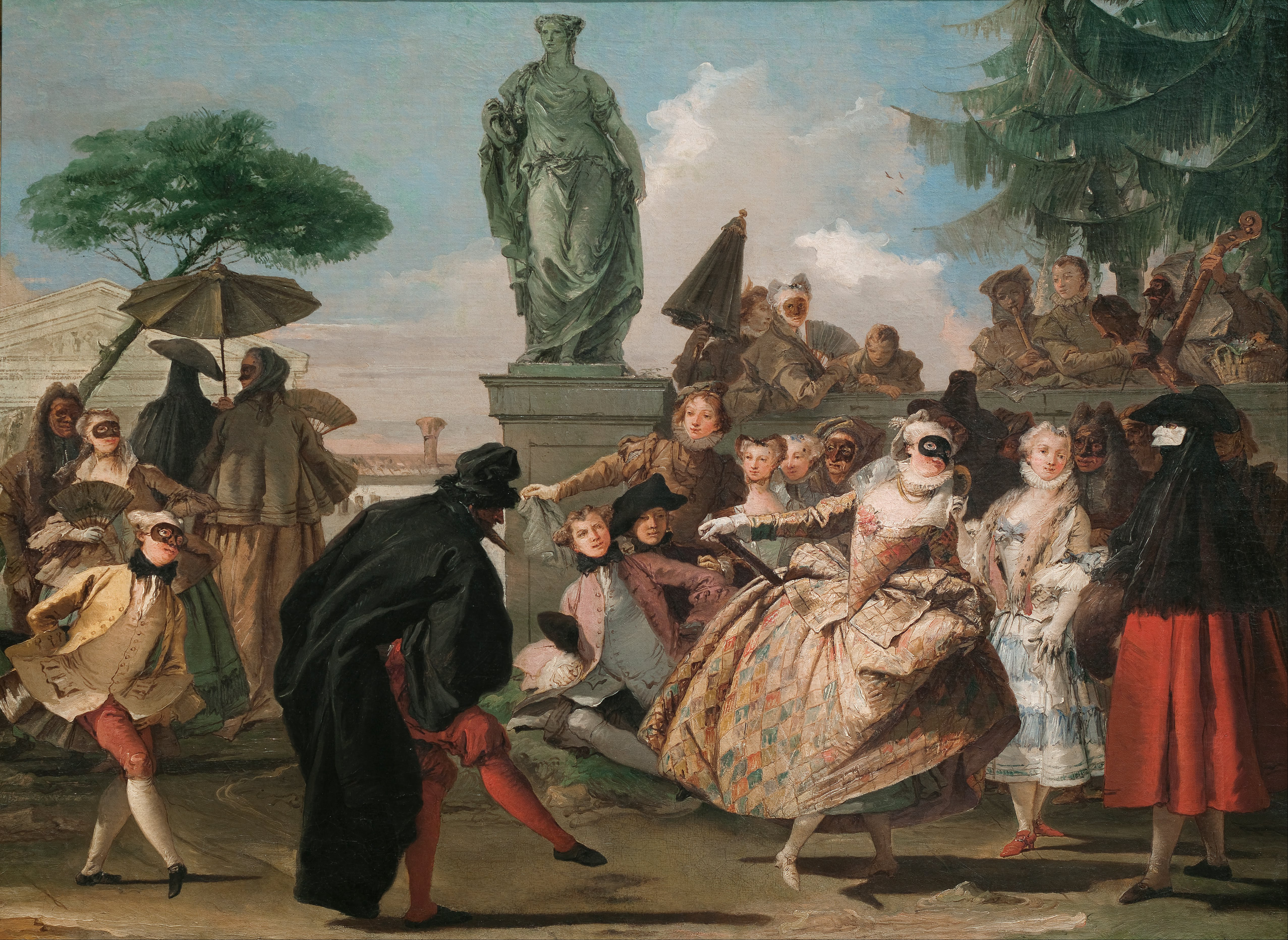
The Minuet, 1756

His painting style developed after the death of his father in 1770, at which time he returned to Venice, and worked there as well as in Genoa and Padua. His painting, though keeping the decorative influence of his father, moved from its spatial fancy and began to take a more realistic direction. His portraits and scenes of life in Venice are characterised by movement, colour, and deliberate composition.

After a lapse of 15 years, his work developed from the religious and mythological subjects of his father to a more secular style. He produced 104 sketches of Punchinello, the standard character of the commedia dell'arte (which would later become Punch in Punch and Judy), a physically deformed clown. These were created as 'Entertainments for the Children', and attempted to poke fun at the pretensions and behaviour of the viewer.

The same protagonist featured in frescos (1759-1797) in his villa di Zianigo near Mirano. These frescoes were detached and nearly sold to be dealt once again in France, but the then Minister of Public Education, blocked the export and acquired them for the city of Venice. Since 1936, they have been on display, in a near replica of the original arrangement, in the Ca' Rezzonico Museum on the Grand Canal. The frescoes have undergone recent restoration. The scenes depict often cryptic events, part genre and part epic-farce, of crowds of Pulcinellos at play and work, as well as a carnival scene. The genre thematic and humor are strikingly different from the grand epic apotheoses painted his father.

== Drawings and prints ==
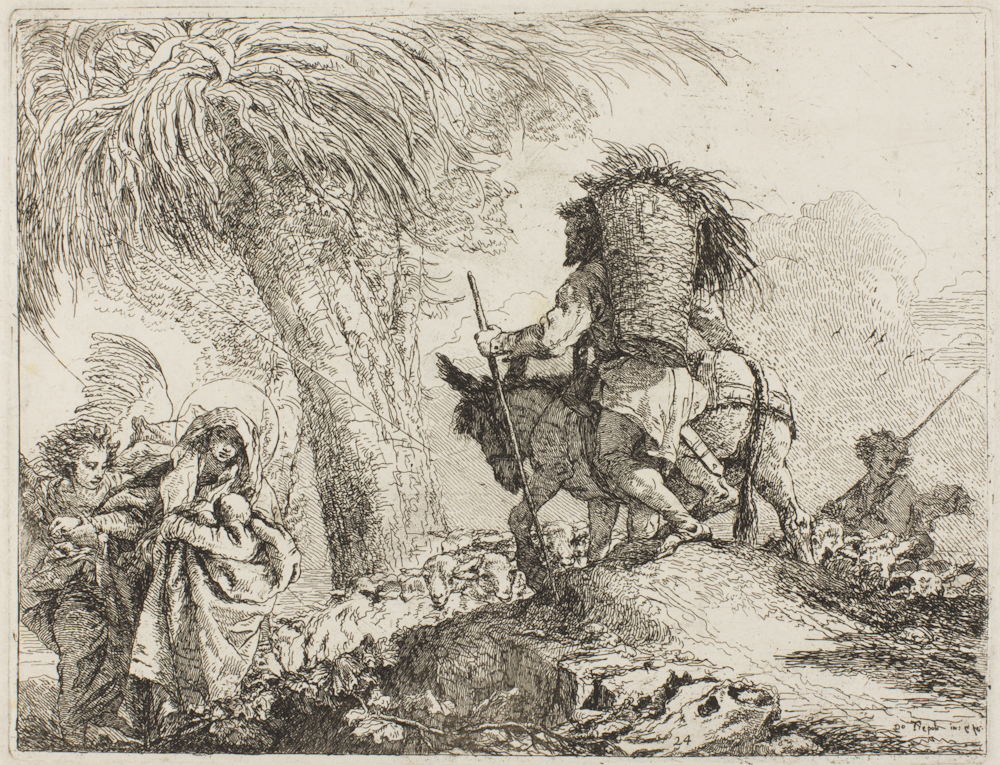
No. 21 of the Idee Pittoresche sulla Fuga in Egitto.

Many of Domenico's works are drawings with ink wash, and he was a fine draftsman, although weaker than his father. His St. Ambrose Addressing the Young St. Augustine sketch is typical of the commissions he would receive. St. Ambrose, with the crozier and mitre, addresses and gives religious instruction to the beardless Saint Augustine. The composition has the pomp and grandiosity of his father's work, set out as if part of a theatrical display. He, however, took 18th-century Venice as the setting for this 4th-century act, drawing on his experience of the city and his many works depicting life in it.

Domenico was also a significant printmaker in etching, often reproducing his own or his father's paintings. But his original compositions include a series of twenty-four illustrations of the Idee Pittoresche sulla Fuga in Egitto ("Picturesque Scenes from the Flight into Egypt"), and one of the fourteen Stations of the Cross.

== Collections ==
The Prado Museum, The Art Gallery of New South Wales (Sydney, Australia), the Blanton Museum of Art (University of Texas, Austin), the Cleveland Museum of Art, the Finnish National Gallery, the Honolulu Museum of Art, the Indiana University Art Museum, Kunst Indeks Danmark, the Minneapolis Institute of Arts, the Musée des Beaux-Arts de Caen, the Musée des Beaux-Arts de Strasbourg, the Musée du Louvre (Paris), Thyssen-Bornemisza Museum (Madrid), Museu Nacional d'Art de Catalunya (Barcelona), the National Gallery (London), the National Museums and Galleries of Wales, the Philadelphia Museum of Art, Pinacoteca Ambrosiana (Milan), Pinacoteca di Brera (Milan), the Portland Art Museum, the Lázaro Galdiano Museum (Madrid), the Royal Museums of Fine Arts of Belgium, the Seattle Art Museum, the Los Angeles County Museum of Art, the Victoria and Albert Museum, the Real Academia de Bellas Artes de San Fernando (Madrid), the Wadsworth Atheneum, and the Rosen House at Caramooor Center for Music & the Arts, are among the public collections holding paintings by Giovanni Domenico Tiepolo.

Giovanni Domenico Tiepolo’s works have been exhibited and collected internationally, with auction prices varying by medium and size. His record auction sale was $4,912,460 in 2013 for a lot of six works titled The Celebrated Deeds of the Porto Family of Vicenza at Sotheby’s London.

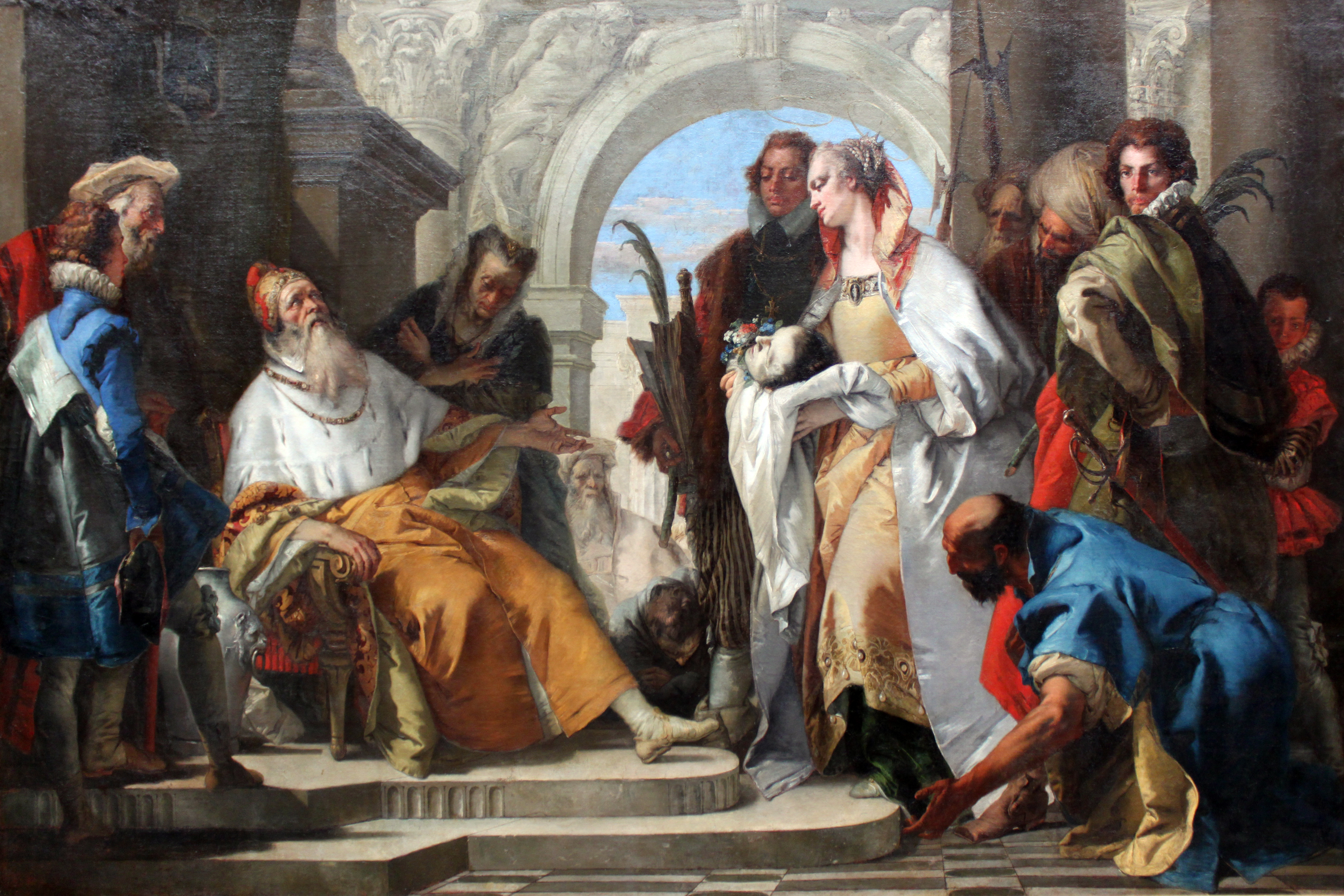
Patron Saints of the Crotta Family, 1750, Städelsches Kunstinstitut

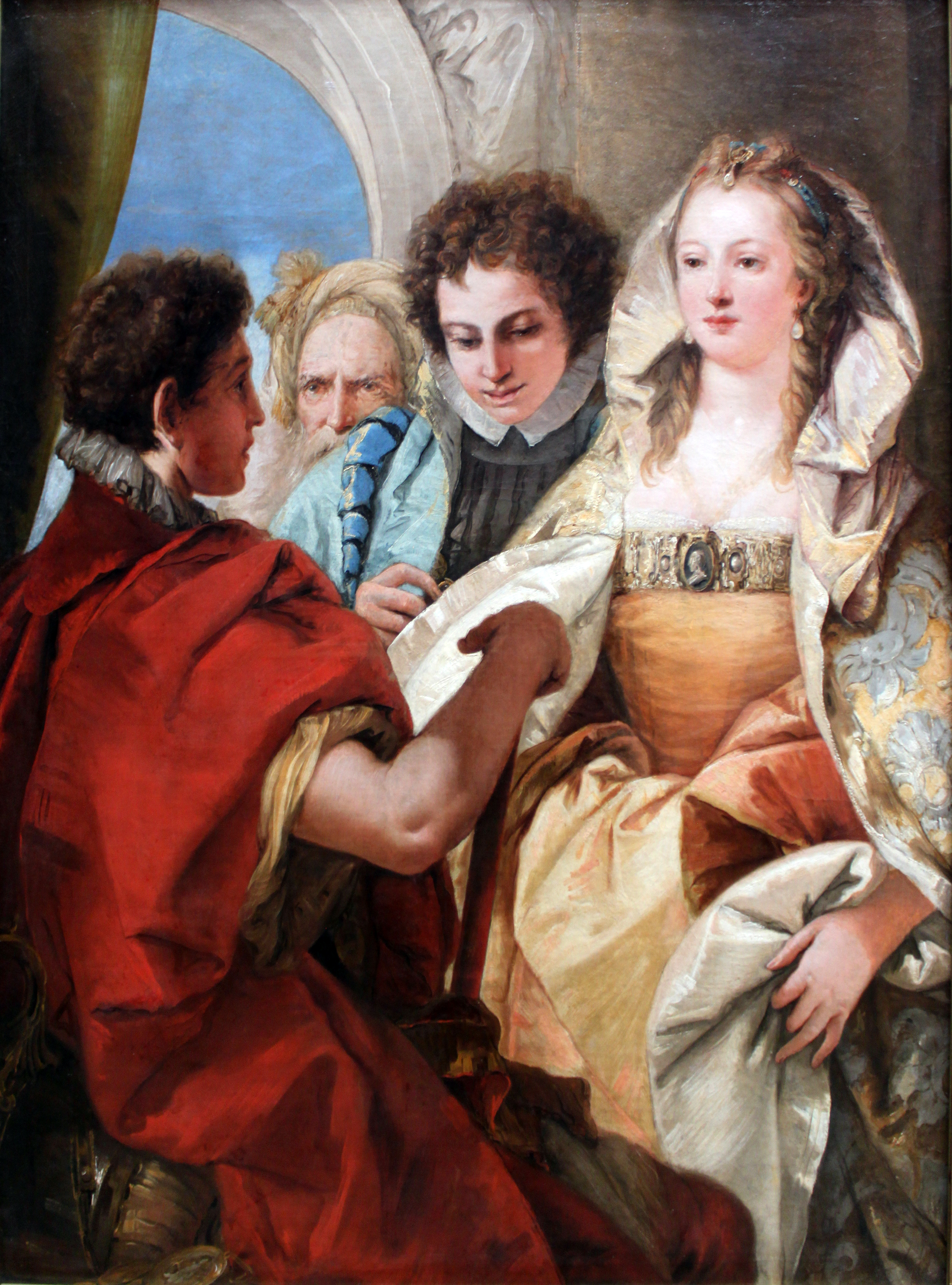
Chastity of Scipio, 1751, Städelsches Kunstinstitut

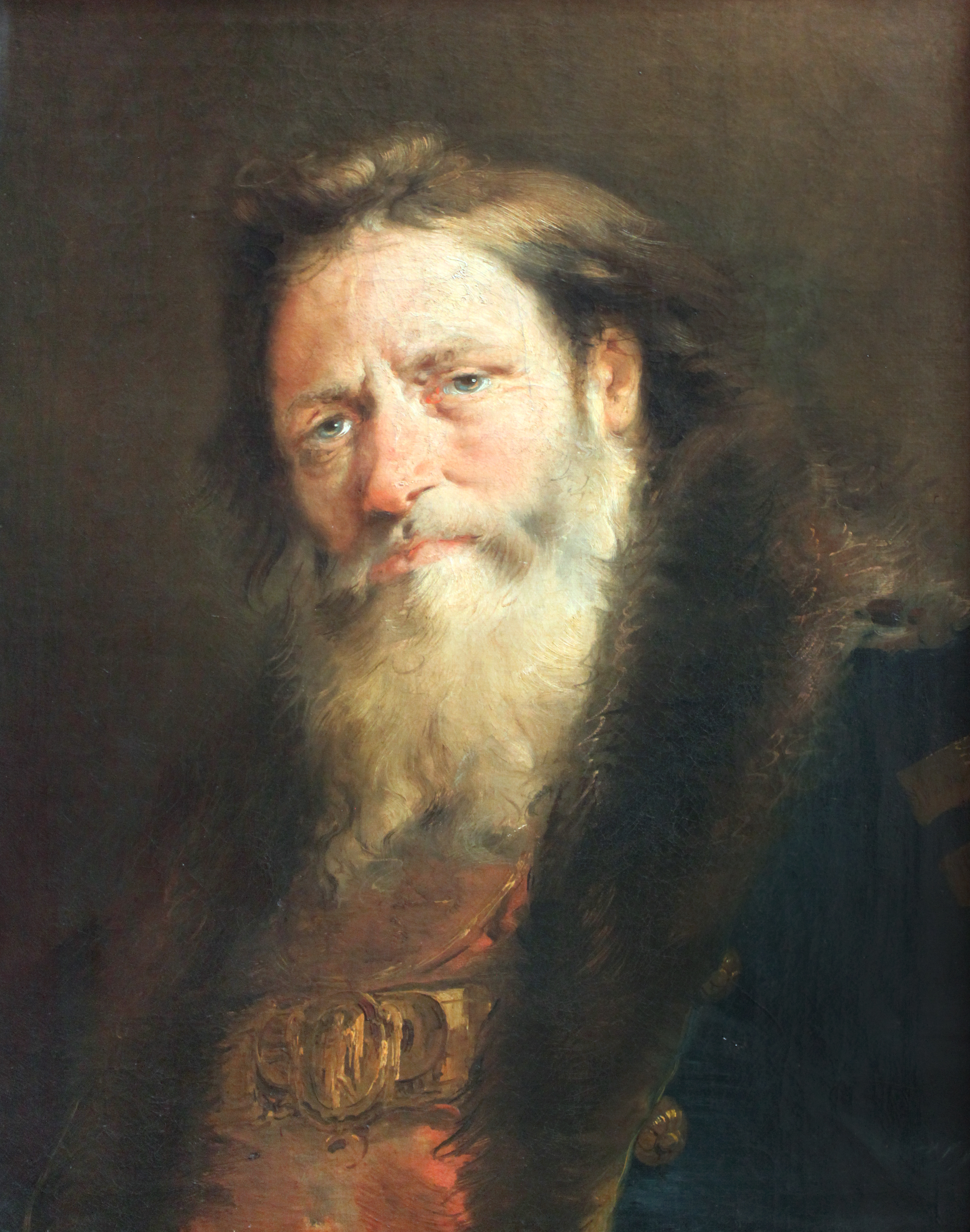
Study head of an old man, 1756, Städelsches Kunstinstitut

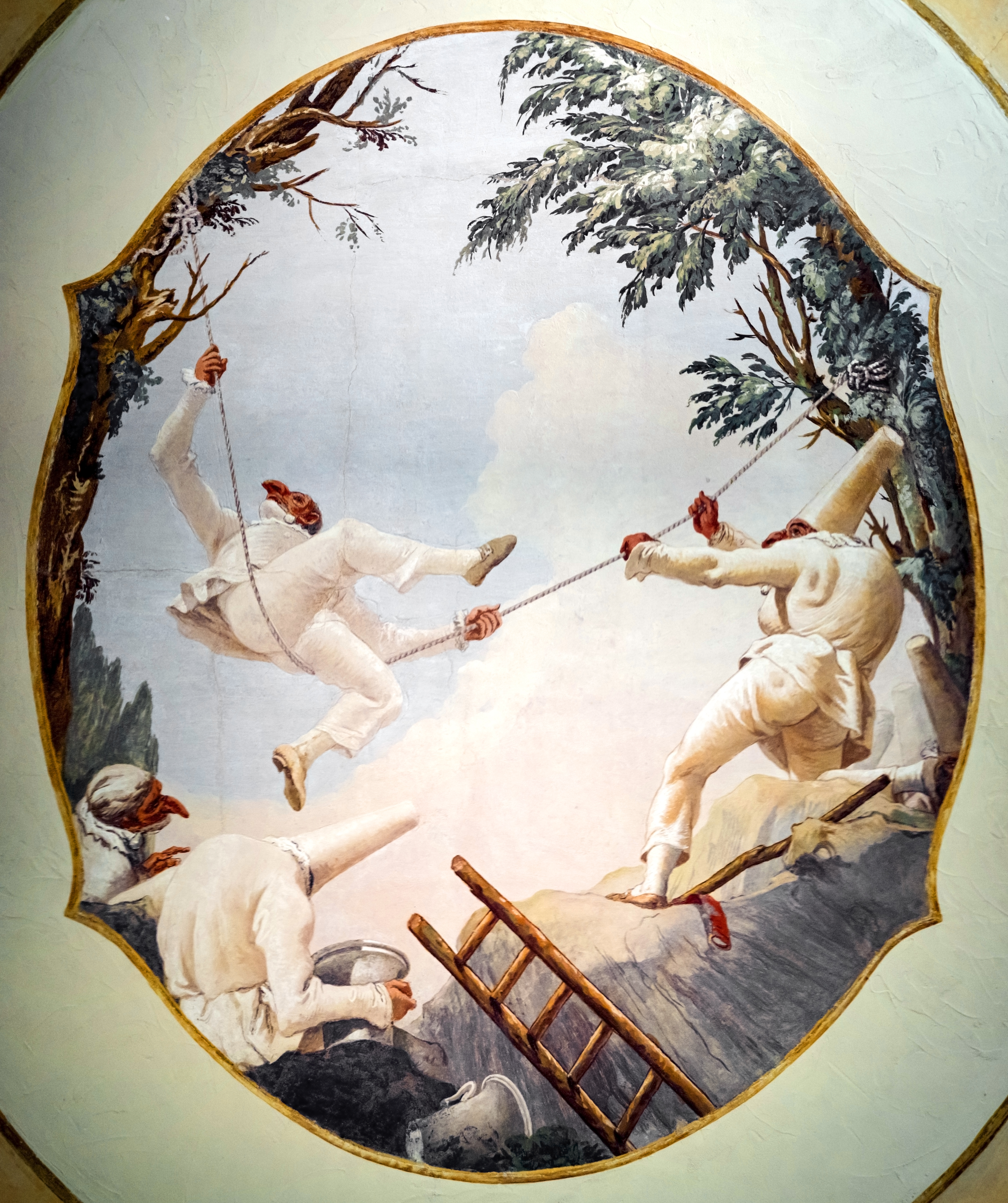
Altalena dei pulcinelli Ca' Rezzonnico Venice

Sketch for St Lio in Glory, for the ceiling of the church of San Lio, Venice.

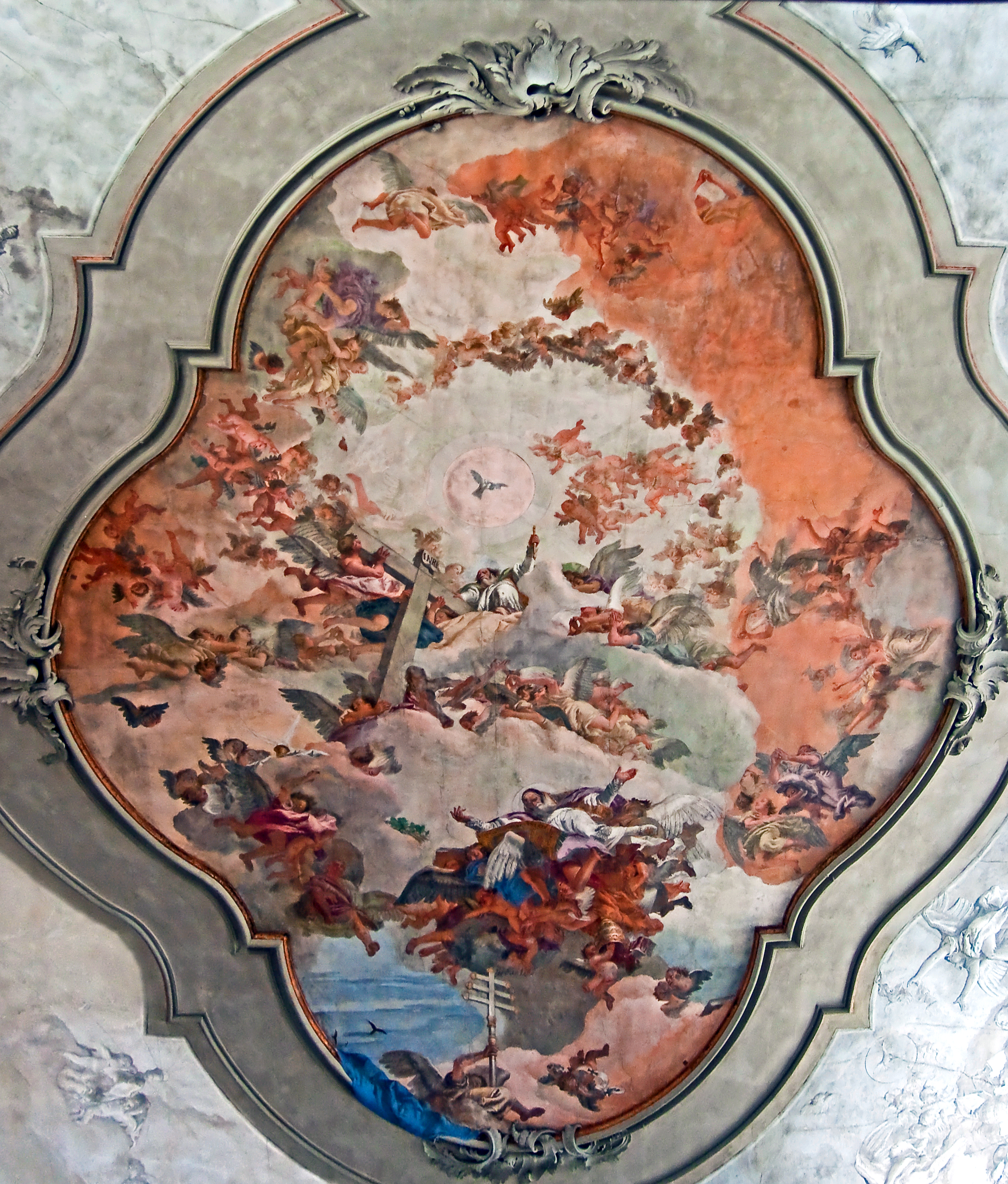
Ceiling of the Church of San Lio, Venice.

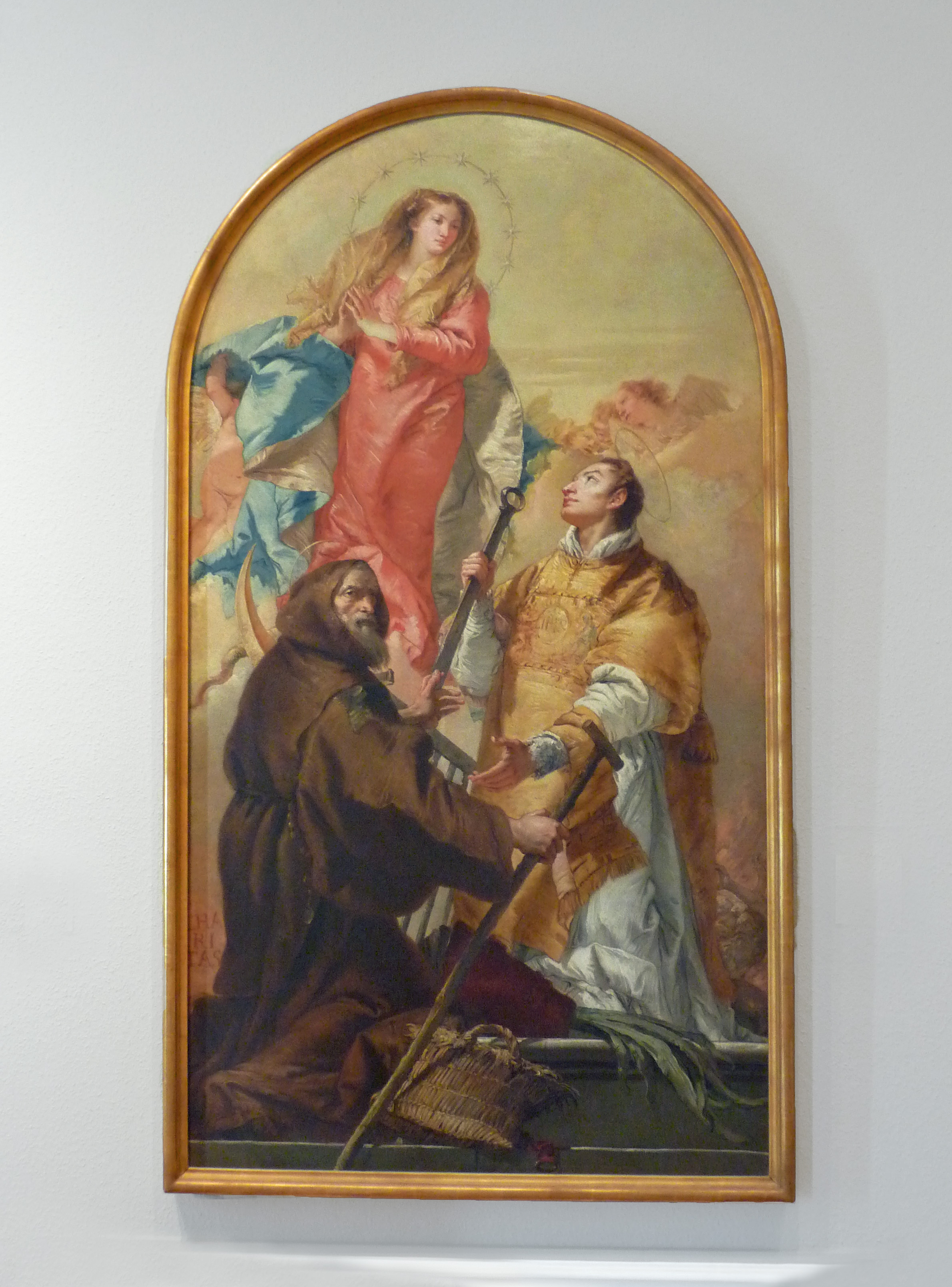
The Immaculate Conception with Saint Lawrence and Saint Francis of Paola, early 1770s (Musée des Beaux-Arts de Strasbourg)

St Ambrose Addressing the Young St Augustine.

Punchinello with the Ostriches.

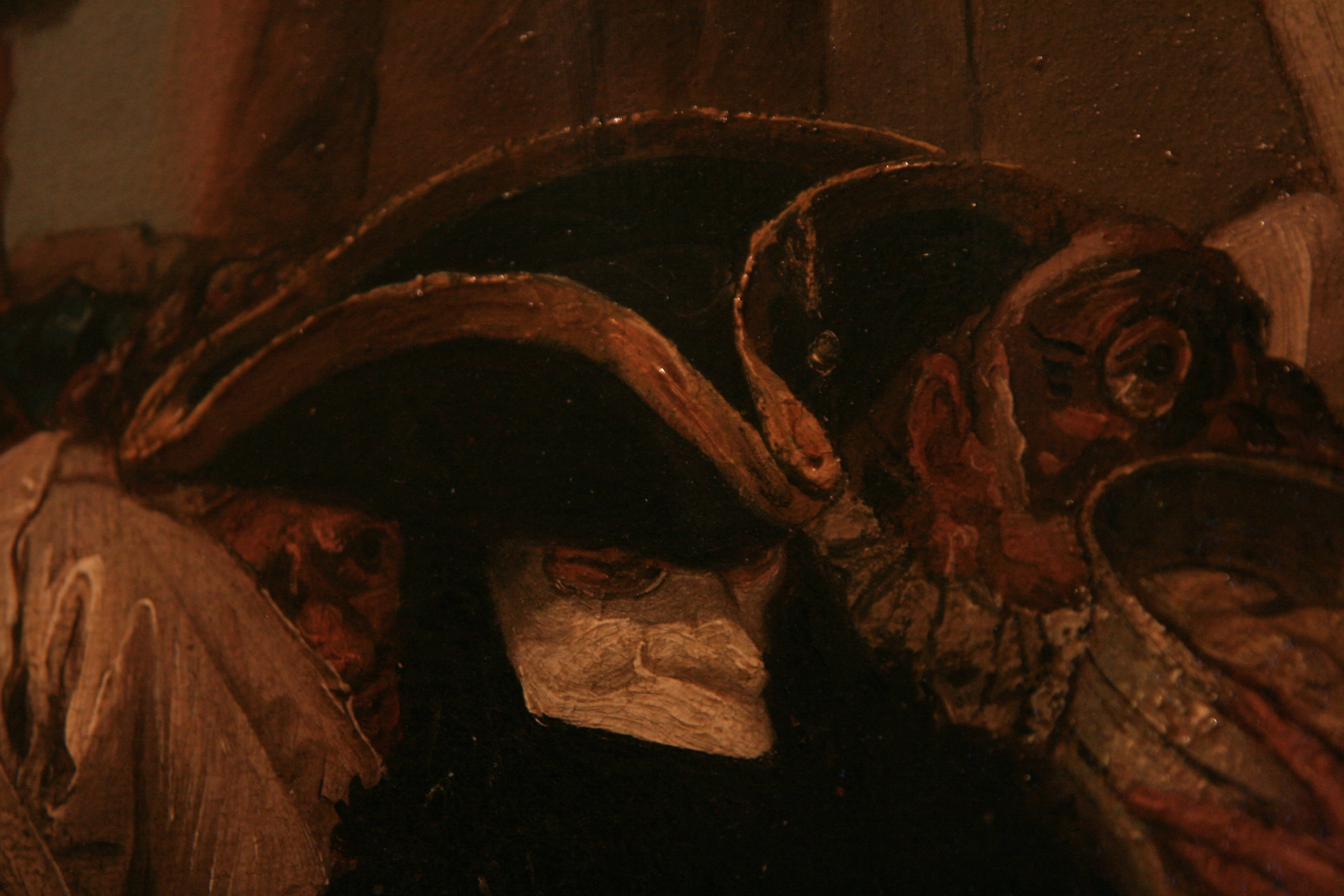
Detail: The quack or tooth puller,1754.

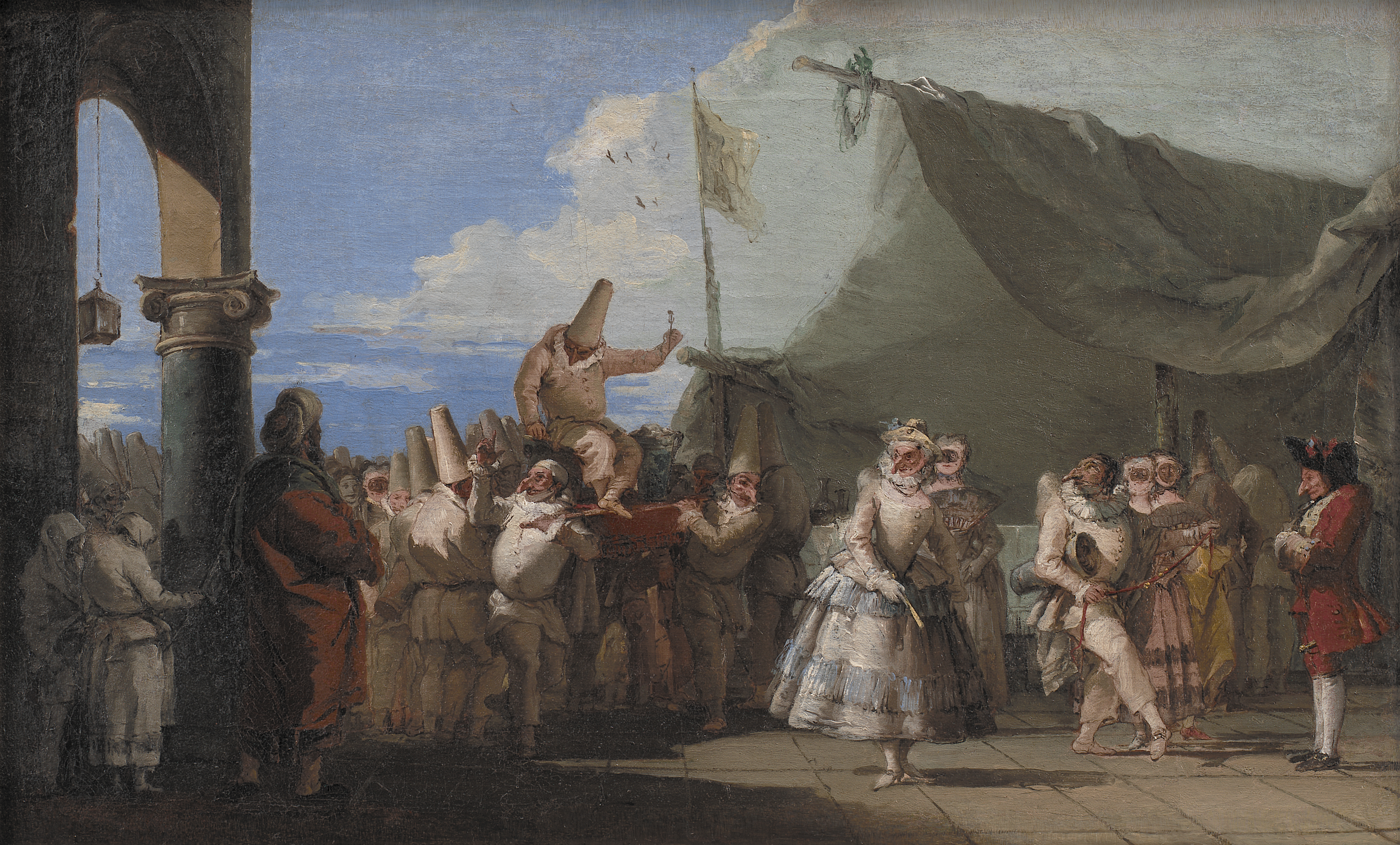
Carnival scene: Triumph of Pulcinella

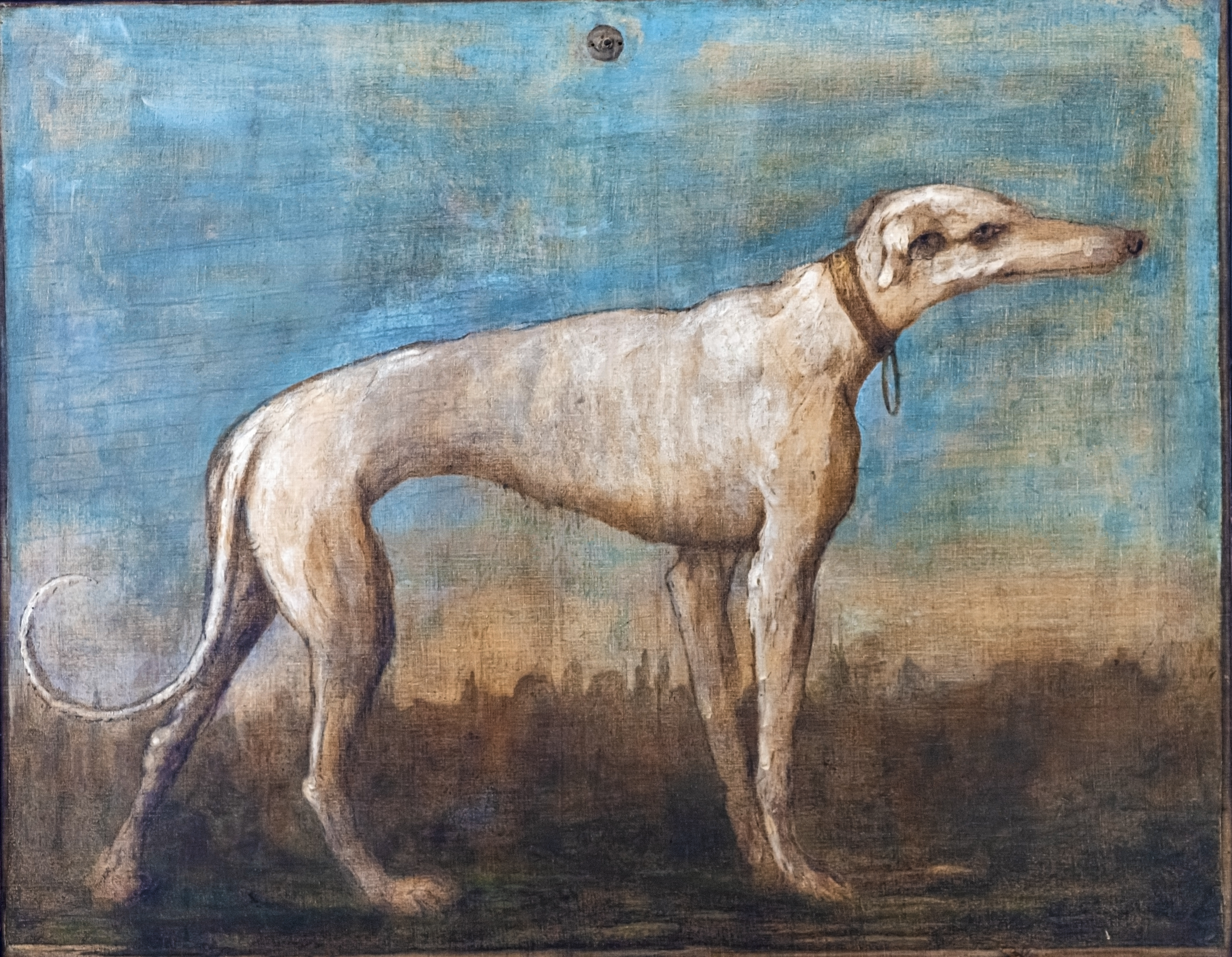
Greyhound, painted for Villa Tiepolo, Zianigo, now at Ca' Rezzonico, Venice

Dedication Page from "Picturesque Scenes from the Flight into Egypt"

== Selected works ==
- The quack or tooth puller (1754) - Musée du Louvre, Paris
- A New Testament (edition 2006)
