= Pablo de Anda Padilla =

Catholic priest (1830–1904)

Venerable Pablo de Anda Padilla
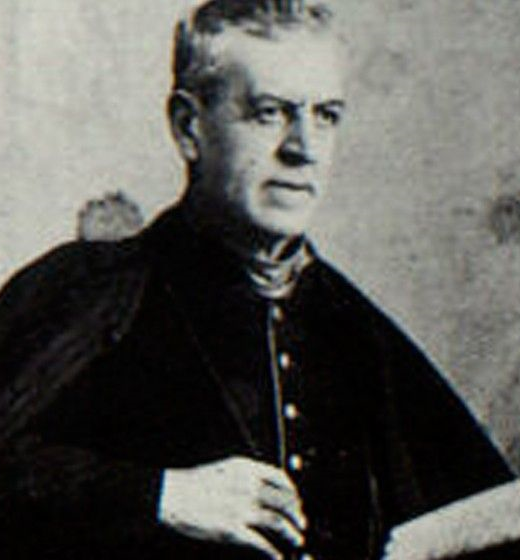
- Born: July 5, 1830; San Juan de los Lagos, Jalisco, Mexico
- Died: June 29, 1904 (aged 73); León, Guanajuato, Mexico

Pablo de Anda Padilla (July 5, 1830 – June 29, 1904) was a Catholic priest and founder of the Minim Daughters of Mary Immaculate.

== Life ==
=== Early years and priesthood ===
Pablo de Anda Padilla was born on July 5, 1830, in the city of San Juan de los Lagos, Jalisco, Mexico. His parents, Mariano de Anda and Sanjuana Padilla had five children: Pedro, José Sóstenes, María Rita, María del Refugio and Pablo. The family environment favored his aspirations to the priesthood and, when he decided to follow that vocation, his parents supported him and moved with him, in 1845, to León, Guanajuato, Mexico, where he began his studies at the Seminary of the Pauline Fathers.

He received Holy Orders on August 24, 1856 at the parish of Venado, in the State of San Luis Potosí in Mexico; his first mass was on September 12 in León, Guanajuato, Mexico.

By the end of the month he was pronounced interim priest of Ahualulco de los Pinos, where he remained until December 14, 1856. On January 1, 1857 he was designated Choir Chaplain of the Cathedral Potosina, with the annexed charges of Master of ceremonies, Mayor sexton, Secretary of Council and Synod of the Clergy of the Diocese, positions he held until March 6, 1865.

=== Founding of the congregation ===
Padilla was a tireless apostle, he opened a Casa de Misericordia, for homeless children, patients and elderly; he created workshops to teach different arts and crafts. He built a sanctuary to Our Lady of Guadalupe on the hill of San Lorenzo in León and founded a hospital next to the sanctuary, where many found refuge after the catastrophic flood in 1888.

He founded the Congregation of Hijas Mínimas de María Inmaculada on March 25, 1886 with only four women; Mercedes de Señor San José Reyes, who until then was known as Soledad; Concepción de Señor San José Barrón, known in the secular world as Refugio Barrón; Guadalupe de Señor San José Reyes, born as Juana; and María de Señor San José Meabe, formerly known as María.

The bishop Tomás Barón y Morales, who gave his blessing and license for the foundation of the new institution, granted them authority to have a small chapel to celebrate mass and save the Sacred Deposit.

The sisters serve in Mexico and Cuba, working in education and health care. In August 1958 they established Guadalupe Tepeyac Clinic.

=== Sickness and disease ===
Three years before his death, Pablo de Anda Padilla became ill and was forced to reduce his activities.

On June 28, 1904, after finishing the Holy Mass, he felt excruciating pain that, according to the symptoms, was the result of bladder stones. At that time, medicine could not do anything, he spent the whole day without any relief. During the night he received the Anointing of the Sick by D. José María Velázquez, accompanied by several priests, especially RR. PP. of the Society of Jesus.

His death was quiet and peaceful, it occurred at four in the morning on June 29, 1904. He was 74 years old and had been priest for 47. His remains are in the Sanctuary of Our Lady of Guadalupe in León.

He was declared venerable by Pope John Paul II on 28 June 1999.

== Institutions run by the congregation today ==
=== Schools ===
- Colegio La Paz, Silao, Guanajuato, Mexico
- Instituto La Salle, Guanajuato, Guanajuato Mexico
- Colegio San Francisco, San Luis de la Paz, Guanajuato, Mexico
- Instituto América, León, Guanajuato, Mexico
- Colegio Pablo Anda, Encarnación de Díaz, Jalisco, Mexico

=== Hospitals ===
- Hospital Pablo de Anda
- Hospital, Guadalupe, Tepeyac
