= Paterno Calabro =

- Comune
- Comune di Paterno Calabro
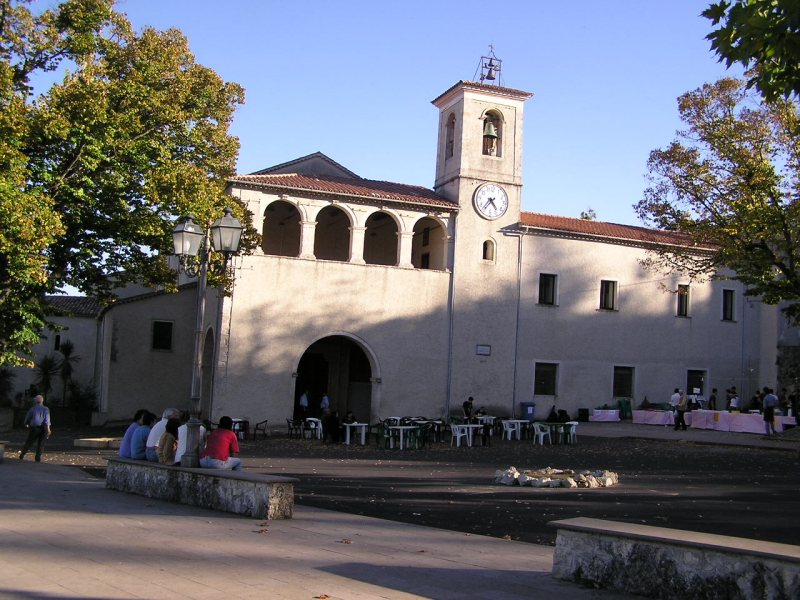
- Sanctuary of St. Francis of Paola.

- Location within Italy Location within Calabria
- Coordinates: 39°14′N 16°16′E
- Country: Italy
- Region: Calabria
- Province: Cosenza (CS)

Government
  - Mayor: Lucia Papaianni

Area
  - Total: 24.2 km^{2} (9.3 sq mi)
- Elevation: 680 m (2,230 ft)

Population (31 December 2017)
  - Total: 1,393
  - Density: 57.6/km^{2} (149/sq mi)
- Demonym: Paternesi
- Time zone: UTC+1 (CET)
  - Summer (DST): UTC+2 (CEST)
- Postal code: 87040
- Dialing code: 0984
- ISTAT code: 078094
- Patron saint: St. Francis Paola
- Saint day: Second Sunday after Easter
- Website: Official website

Paterno Calabro is a town and comune in the province of Cosenza in the Calabria region of southern Italy.
