= Santa Maria della Catena, Alcamo =

Church building in Alcamo, Italy

Santa Maria della Catena
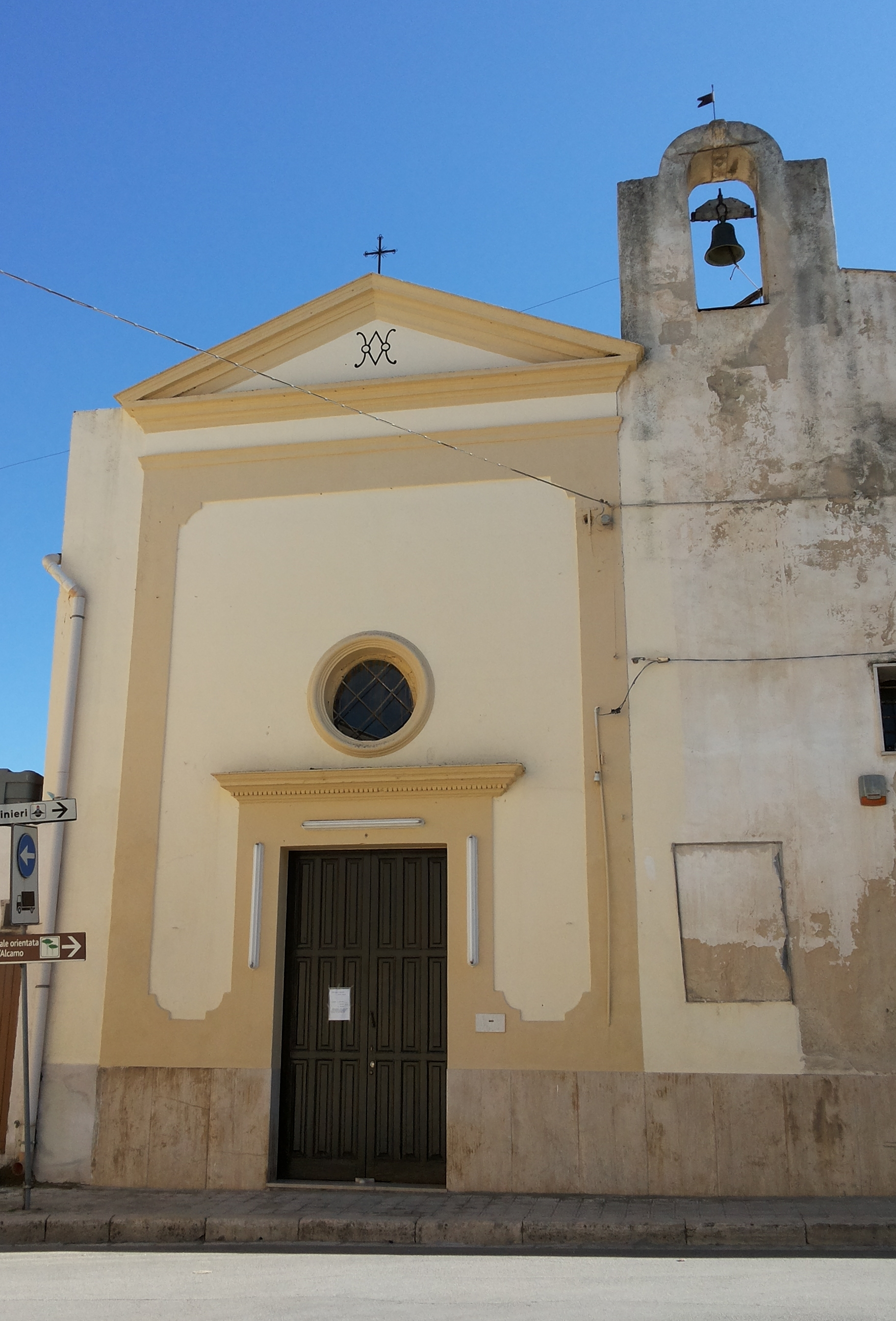
- The façade

Religion
- Affiliation: Catholic
- Province: province of Trapani
- Region: Sicily
- Rite: Catholic
- Patron: Our Lady with a Chain

Location
- Location: Alcamo, province of Trapani, Italy
- Municipality: Alcamo
- State: Italy
- Interactive map of Santa Maria della Catena
- Territory: Alcamo
- Coordinates: 37°58′44″N 12°58′11″E

Santa Maria della Catena ("Holy Mary of the Chain") is a Catholic church located in Alcamo, in the province of Trapani.

== History ==
This church was originally built at about a thousand steps from the eastern town walls in Alcamo; though nobody knows the exact date of its construction, we know, from the deed of the notary Pier Antonio Balduccio IV, that it already existed in 1545.

On 19 June 1619 it was aggregated to the church of Santissima Trinità, that had recently been elevated to parish by the bishop of Mazara del Vallo following his pastoral visit.

In 1633 they founded here the Congregation of Our Lady with a Chain (extinguished later), which was formed by butchers. Owing to the distance of this church from the town, and the uncomfortable walk, above all in winter, the members of this Congregation decided to rebuild it, at their own expense, in a place nearer to the built-up area.

For this reason, in 1661 they bought the houses with vaulted roof called "case della Macina" (houses of the millstone), located opposite the south-eastern walls of the town from the Convent of saint Clare, and, under their patronage, founded the new Church of Our Lady with a Chain.

In the same year they asked the Bishop the permission to carry the ancient image of the Virgin Mary into the new church, but the transport was blocked by the new beneficiary parson of the old Church who imposed in exchange that the administration of the new church were assigned to the parish of Santi Paolo e Bartolomeo, rather than the parish of Santissima Trinità. After coming to an agreement, the sacred image was carried on 26 June 1661.

In 1922 the Reverend Ignazio Corrao founded here the female Congregation of Our Lady with a Chain.

== Description and works ==
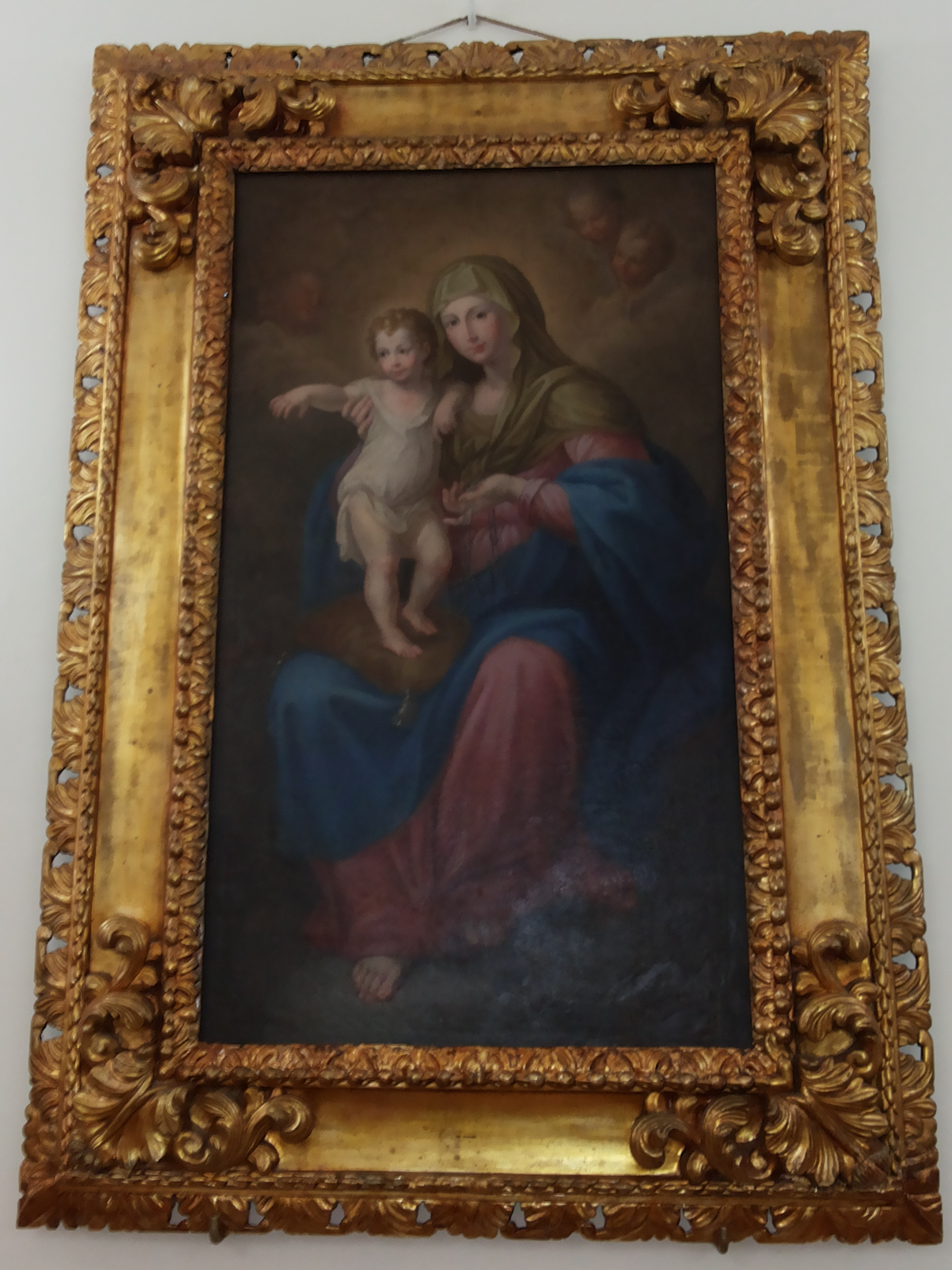
The painting of Our Lady with a Chain by Giuseppe Renda (1799).

Inside the Church, there is a painting dated 1799, realized by Giuseppe Renda, a painter from Alcamo, which represents Our Lady with a Chain. It is set in a 17th-century frame and was restored in 2009, thanks to the financial support given by the Rotary Club of Alcamo.

== Sources ==
- Cataldo, Carlo (2001). La conchiglia di S. Giacomo. Alcamo: Edizioni Campo.
