= Sant'Oliva, Alcamo =

Church building in Alcamo, Italy

Sant'Oliva
- Chiesa di Sant'Oliva
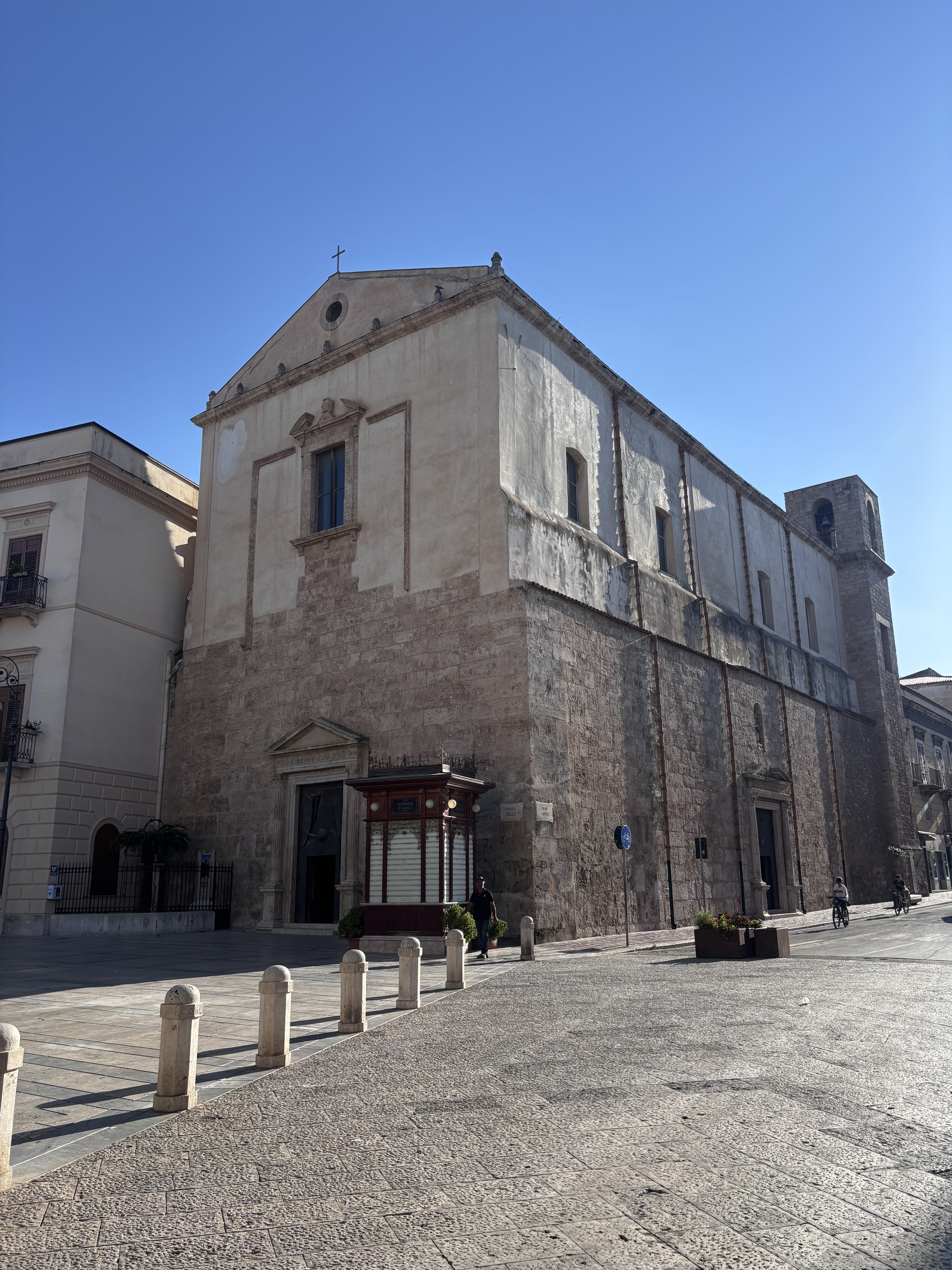
- The church in 2026

Religion
- Affiliation: Catholic
- Province: province of Trapani
- Region: Sicily
- Patron: Saint Olivia

Location
- Location: Alcamo, province of Trapani, Italy
- State: Italy
- Interactive map of Sant'Oliva
- Territory: Alcamo
- Coordinates: 37°58′50″N 12°57′52″E

Architecture
- Groundbreaking: 1533

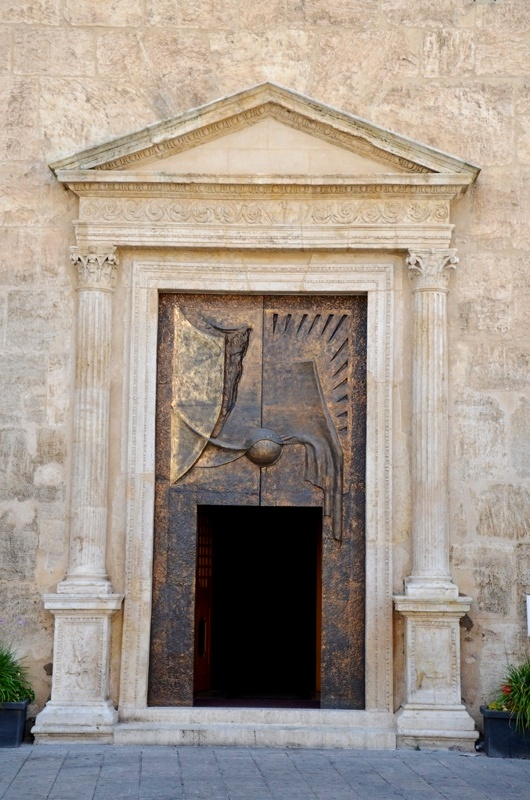
Main portal.

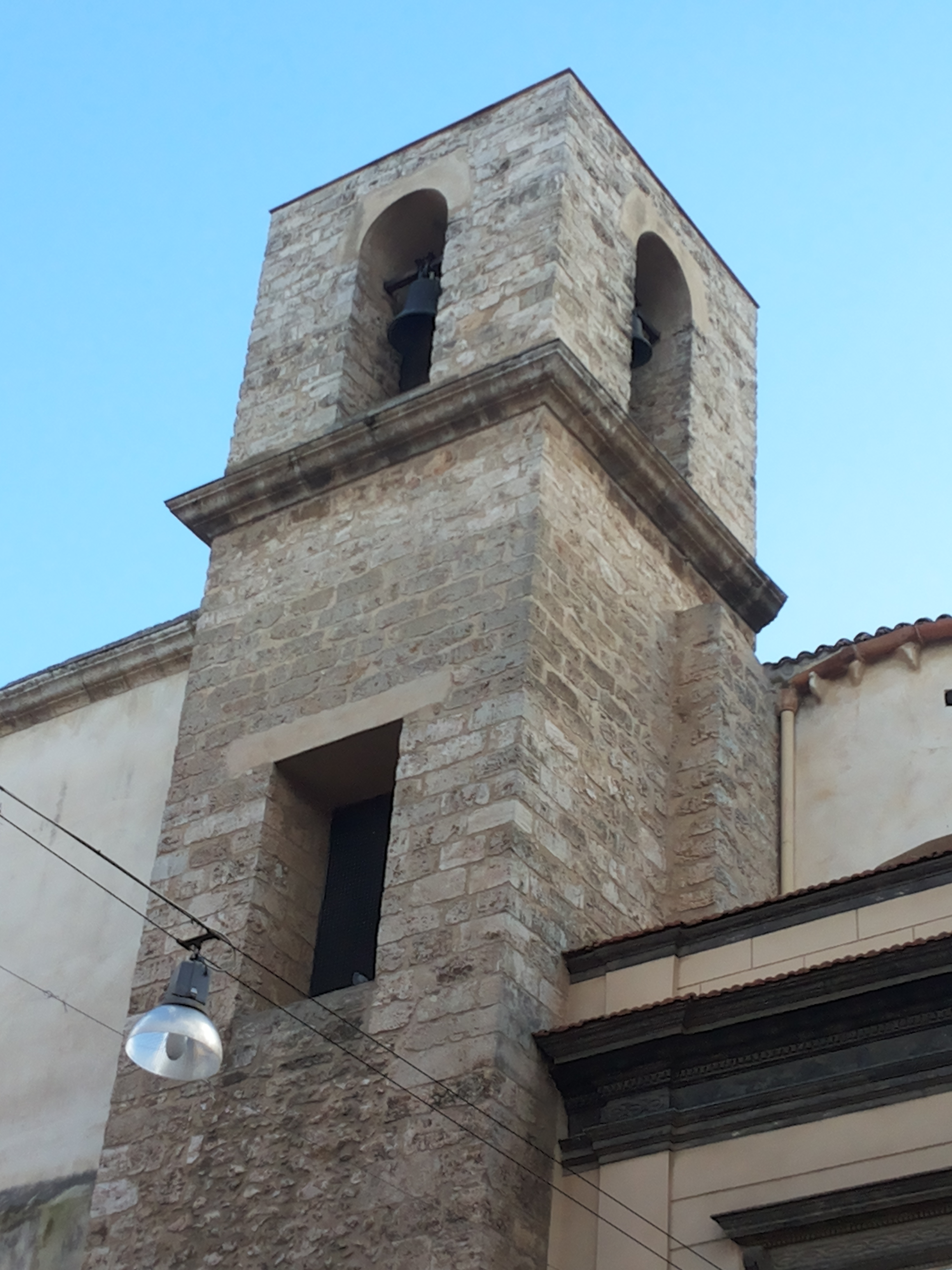
Bell tower.

Sant'Oliva ("Saint Olivia") is a catholic church located in Alcamo, province of Trapani, Sicily, southern Italy.

== History ==
The foundation of the Church of Saint Olivia dates back to 1533. Initially, the church had a nave and two aisles, in gothic-Catalan style.

In 1687 the Night Congregation of the Seven Pains, formed by artists, was founded in this church.

In 1724, the church was rebuilt in the present form, with a longitudinal plan that had one nave, after the design of Giovanni Biagio Amico, an architect from Trapani.

After its construction, the church gave the name to the square on which it faces (on the side of the main entrance), called piano Sant'Oliva. In the 17th century, the square was enlarged with the building of the Church of Our Lady of Stellario (finished in 1625) and the Church of Jesus in 1684. Probably during this period, the square was renamed piazza Maggiore: this name remained until 1875, when it was changed to the present one piazza Ciullo.

In 1927, the Congregation of Saint Rita, and in 1933, the Congregation of Our Lady of Sorrows, were founded in the church. Later, in 1949, Catholic Action (Azione Cattolica) began its activity inside it, thanks to local noblewoman, Donna Caterina Mistretta.

During the night of 7–8 August 1987, a fire destroyed the ceiling of the church; it was rebuilt some years later thanks to the Sovrintendenza ai Beni Culturali of Sicily.

In 1990, there were some restoration works on sculptures, paintings, two wooden organs, golden stucco frames and some wooden fittings belonging to the church.

== Description and works ==
Map of Saint Oliva's church A: main door B: side entrance C: exit from the bell tower's side D: entrance of sacristy E: secondary exit 1-4: chapels in the left nave 5: apse 6-9: chapels in the right nave.

The church has two portals: the main one overlooks piazza Ciullo, while the other one, with the statue of Saint Olivia on it, faces Corso 6 Aprile. Initially, there was a main portal dating back to 1572, but after the acquisition of some funds in connection with the Great Jubilee, both doors were replaced by two golden bronze ones realized by Vincenzo Settipani, an architect. They were made to represent "Jesus while entering the Cenacle with closed doors" (on the main entrance) and "Jesus' entering Jerusalem" (on the side entrance).

At the corner of the church adjoining Corso 6 Aprile, there stands the bell tower, without a pinnacle.

Inside the Church there are marble polychrom altars made by Mariano and Simone Pennino. The walls are decorated by stuccoes created by Gabriele Messina in 1756, and by Francesco and Giuseppe Russo in 1771.

On the high altar, there is a painting called the Purgatory's Souls set free through the Mass' Sacrifice, realized by Pietro Novelli in 1639, and ordered by the Congregation of Purgatory.

Additionally, the church contains the following sculptures:

- The marble group of Annunciation, carved in 1545 by Antonino and Giacomo Gagini, which come from the church of the Annunciation.

The baptistery made by Salvatore Occhipinti in 1947

- The statue of Saint Eligius made in white marble from Carrara and carved by Filippo Pennino in 1767. It was ordered by the brothers of Saint Eligius. Before 1577, Saint Eligio's altar belonged to Maestranza of blacksmiths;
- A wooden Crucifix made by Giovan Pietro D'Angelo in 1574: since 1954 there is the statue of Our Lady of Sorrows by Lorenzo Curti, carved in 1725
- Our Lady of Refuge, a marble statue assigned to Filippo Pennino
- The marble statue dedicated to Saint Olivia, made by Antonello Gagini in 1511, which was commissioned by the brethren of Saint Olivia.
- The statue of Saint Joseph with the Child, placed on the altar belonging to Maestranza of carpenters and to Maestranza of coopers. The realization of this statue was assigned to Girolamo Bagnasco in the middle of the 19th century.
- The wooden statue representing Saint Rita, made by Luigi Santifaller (1962);
- The wooden statue of Our Lady of Miracles, realized by Luigi Santifaller (1949).
- the wooden statue of saint Rita by Luigi Santifaller (1962)
- The marble statue of Saint Luke, made by the Gagini family.
- The marble statue of Saint Angel, also made by the Gagini family.
- Two holy water stoups, at both sides of the entrance, made by Mariano Pennino in 1774.

== See also ==
- Piazza Ciullo

== Sources ==
- Cataldo, Carlo (2001). La conchiglia di S. Giacomo. Alcamo: Edizioni Campo.
- Renda, Saverio. Universa nostra caritas De gloria Olivae (La gloria di Gerusalemme). Litotipografia Abate. Archived from the original on 2015-12-22.
- Regina, Vincenzo (1997). Alcamo: la chiesa di S. Oliva nella storia e nell'arte dei Gagini, di Pietro Novelli e di Giovan Biagio Amico. Alcamo: Cartogram.
