= Sant'Agostino, Alcamo =

Church building in Alcamo, Italy

Sant'Agostino
- Chiesa di Sant'Agostino
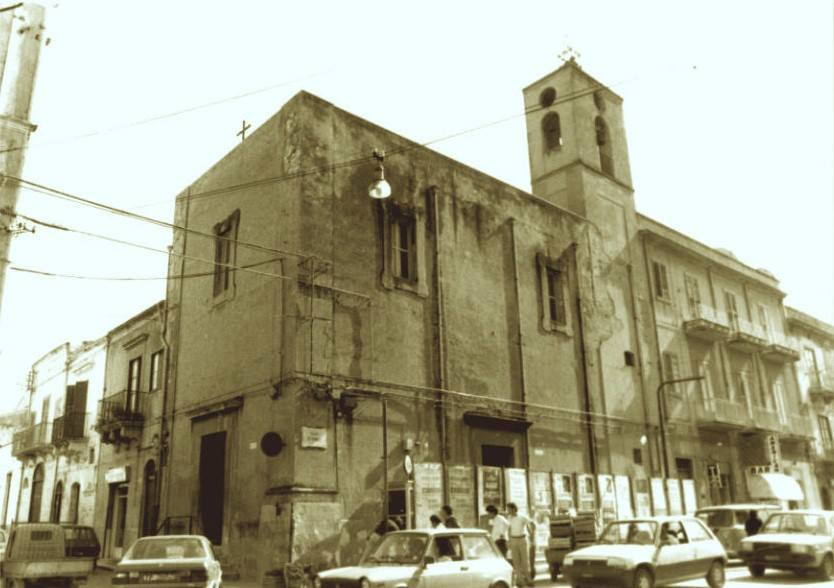
- The façade

Religion
- Affiliation: Agostinian
- Province: province of Trapani
- Region: Sicily
- Rite: Catholic
- Ecclesiastical or organizational status: Rectory
- Patron: Saint Augustine

Location
- Location: Alcamo, province of Trapani, Italy
- Municipality: Alcamo
- State: Italy
- Interactive map of Sant'Agostino
- Territory: Alcamo
- Coordinates: 37°58′49″N 12°57′40″E

Architecture
- Groundbreaking: 1589

Sant'Agostino ("Saint Augustine") is a Catholic church located in Alcamo, in the province of Trapani.

== History ==
In 1506 the Fathers of the Order of Saint Augustine had already a friary in Alcamo opposite Porta Saccari (a town gate) near the present via San Nicolò. As they bore hard being subject to the Bishop’s authority, in 1589 they built another friary, together with the Church of Saint Augustine, in the same place where the Church is located now.

In 1650 the premises were still being constructed because the monks lived in great poverty of alms in kind and finally, in 1660, for the same reasons they left both the Church and the friary to the vescovile Curia; since 1713 they were administrated by the parish of Saints Paul and Bartholomew's Church. During the years 1849–1850 it was rebuilt in the rectangular shape, with chapels having pilasters and corinthian capitals; then it was restored several times, while the area where there was the friary was used for private residences.

At present the parson of the Saints Paul and Bartholomew's Church is the Rector of this Church.

In 1876 they founded the Pia Unione Femminile Gesù, Maria and Giuseppe: its founder, the priest Antonio Barbuscia Santoro, was told by his mother, when a boy, that during his birth (with death danger for both of them), he had been consecrated to the Holy Family. The parson of the Saints Paul and Bartholomew's Church gave this priest an altar with the image of the Holy Family. As "good and evil inside families and society originated from woman's good and bad behaviour", the scopes of this Congregation were:

- to put a stop to all the evils filling the town
- to honour Jesus, Mary and saint Joseph
- give to its members every means more profitable for their sanctification and the moral and religious edification of their families.

== Works ==
The Church has 5 altars and one nave with a barrel vault; there are 24 built-in pillars with Corinthian capitals.

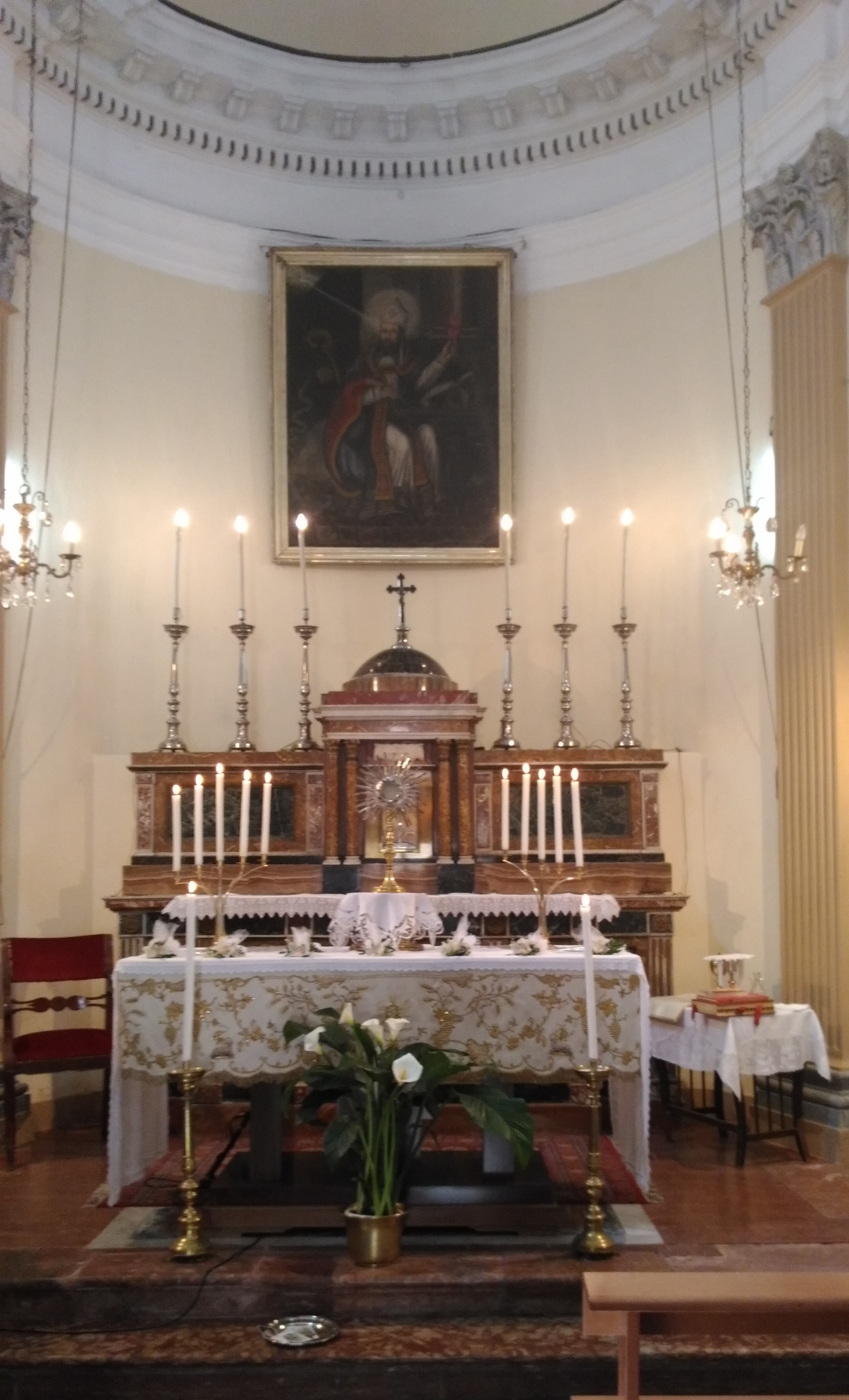
Main altar

- High altar: Saint Augustine, a painting made by an unknown author; until 1835 it was dedicated to Saint Nicholas of Tolentino, with a painting on canvas made 1610 by Giuseppe Carrera, now hosted in the anti sacristy of the Saints Paul and Bartholomew's Church.
- Brass Tabernacle in Gothic style and inlayings (in the high altar

On the sides of the high altar there are a painting with saint Augustine and one with saint Monica on the right, and a painting with saint Rosalia and Our Lady of Dying People (Madonna degli Agonizzanti)

- First right chapel: Saint Nicholas, wooden statue made by L. Santifaller
- Second right chapel: a painting with the Holy Family, dating back to the second half of the 19th century.

== See also ==
- Alcamo
- Agostiniani
- sant'Agostino

== Sources ==
- Carlo Cataldo: Guida storico-artistica dei beni culturali di Alcamo-Calatafimi-Castellammare del Golfo p. 82; Sarograf, Alcamo, 1982
- Carlo Cataldo: La conchiglia di S.Giacomo p. 227; Campo, Alcamo, 2001
