= Sanctuary of Madonna dei Miracoli =

Church building in Alcamo, Italy

- Santuario della Madonna dei Miracoli
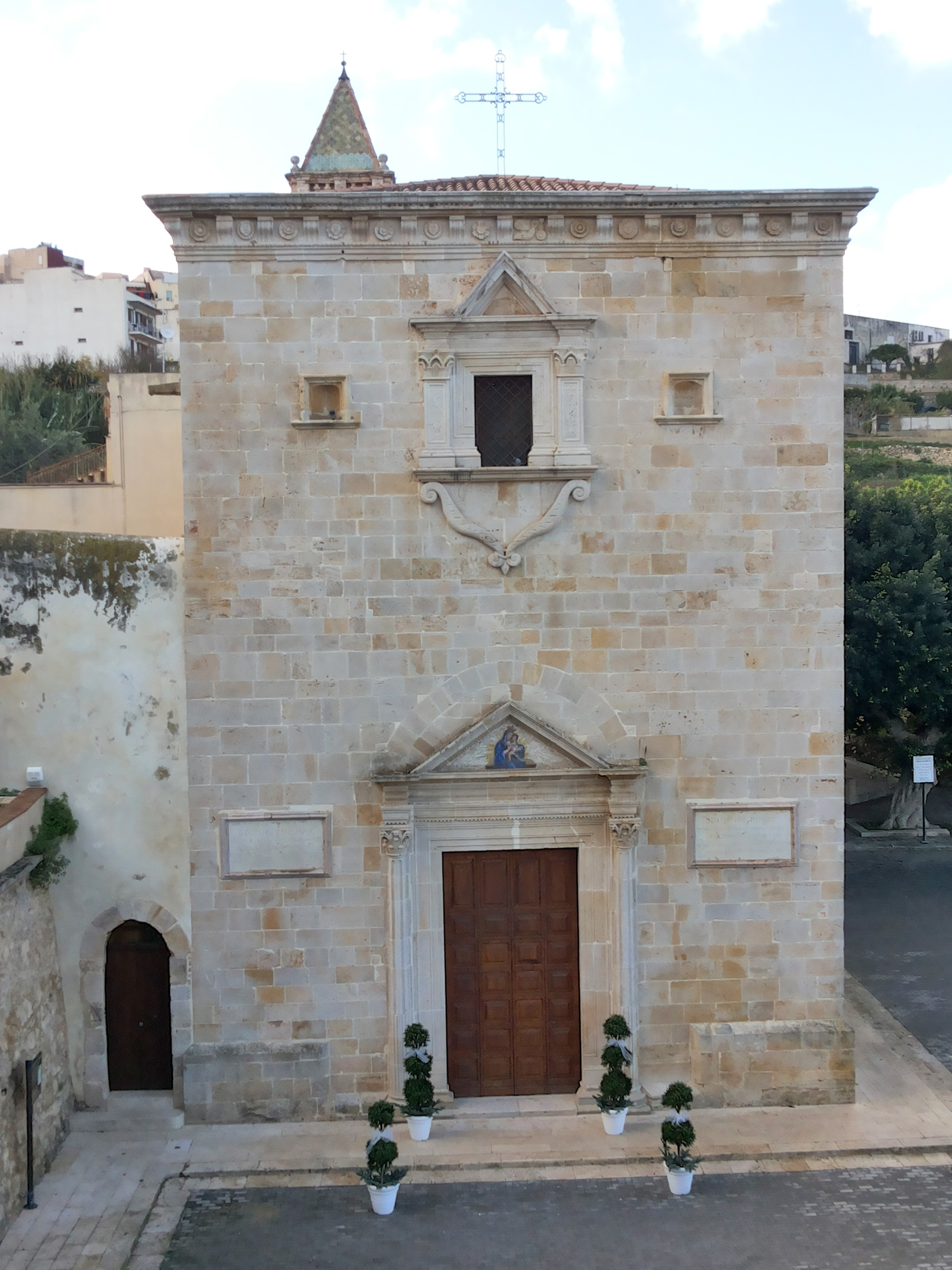
- Façade of the sanctuary of Madonna of Miracles

Religion
- Affiliation: Roman Catholic
- Province: Trapani
- Region: Sicily
- Rite: Catholic

Location
- Location: Alcamo, Trapani, Italy
- State: Italy
- Interactive map of Sanctuary of Madonna dei Miracoli
- Territory: Alcamo
- Coordinates: 37.984770°N 12.966656°E

Architecture
- Style: Baroque-Renaissance style

The Sanctuary of Madonna dei Miracoli ("Holy Mary of Miracles") is a church in Alcamo, province of Trapani, Sicily, southern Italy; it is dedicated to the Madonna of the Miracles (the patron saint of Alcamo).

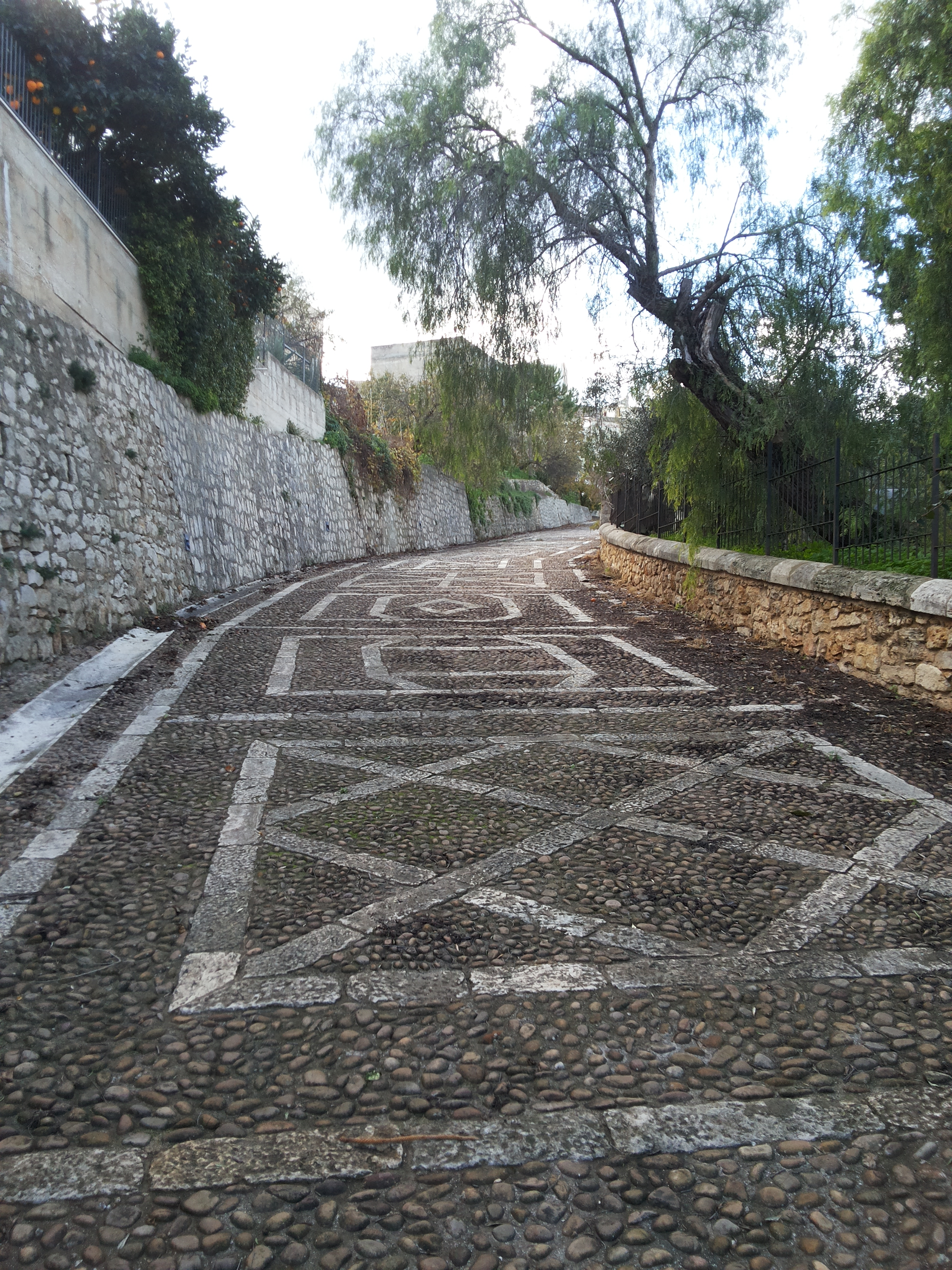
The sanctuary footpath.

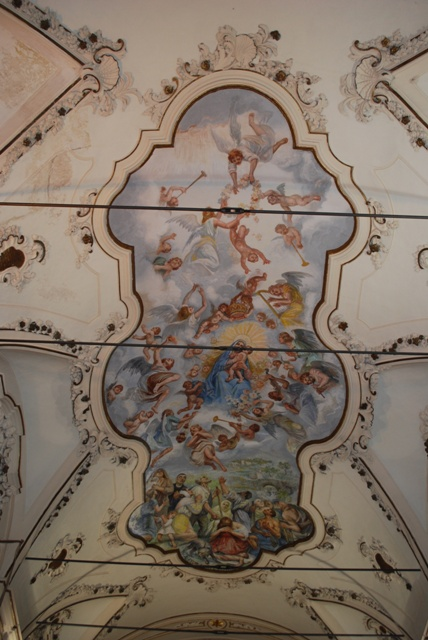
The Madonna of Miracles' Glorification.

== History ==
The sanctuary was built in 1547 by order of the governor and captain of justice of Alcamo Fernando Vega and following the discovery of an icon of Madonna of Miracles in a small chapel which had been abandoned. Afterwards the sanctuary was modified several times, with a restoration in the first years of the 18th century.

In 1754 it was aggregated to the Basilica di Santa Maria Maggiore of Rome; in 1784 there was the solemn coronation of Our Lady of Miracles. In 1901 they founded here the pious congregation Le predilette di Maria.

In 2015, in connection with the Extraordinary Jubilee of Mercy, the sanctuary was proclaimed "Holy Door" of Alcamo, together with the Basilica of Our Lady of the Assumption.

== Descriptions and works ==
You can reach the sanctuary through a downhill pebbled footpath which leads to a large flight of steps near the church. The sanctuary, in a Baroque-Renaissance style, has got two façades with two different portals. On the main façade, opposite the footpath, there is a jut window surrounded by two smaller ones.

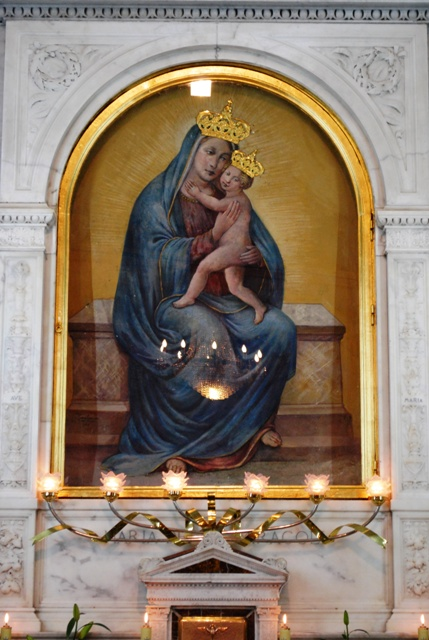
The crowned painting of Madonna of Miracles.

The interior of the sanctuary has a single nave with 8 altars, there are also some stuccoes by Nicolò Curti made in 1762.

On the vault of the sanctuary there is a fresco representing the glorification of Our Lady of Miracles, while in the apse there is a second fresco with the apparition of Our Lady of Miracles to a group of women, and a third one with the founding of Our Lady of Miracles. These three works were realized in 1947 by Alessandro Abate, a painter from Catania.

These are the other works:

- Next to the main entrance, on the left, there is the marble sarcophagus made by Rocco di Rapi in 1557 and containing the mortal remains of Don Fernando Vega.
- First left altar: the Nativity of the Virgin Mary, a painting made in 1851 by Giuseppe Patania, a painter from Palermo.
- In the chapel dedicated to Maria Santissima dei Miracoli, surrounded by a round red marble arc, you can admire the painting representing Our Lady of Miracles. On 21 June 1784 the Madonna's image was crowned.

The picture was painted a second time in 1890, following a fire, and restored in 1963 by the Sicilian painter Gianbecchina.

- Third left altar: the Holy Family, a canvas made by Patania in 1847
- High altar: Our Lady of Miracles with saint Rocco, saint Sebastian and saint Rosalia (co-patrons of the town of Alcamo) during the end of the plague in 1575, painted by Patania in 1828
- First right altar: the Annunciation, painted by Patania in 1851
- Second right altar: the Crucifixion, painted by Patania in 1847
- Next to the main entrance, on the right: a white marble holy water stoup, probable work of the 17th century
- On the right wall of the nave there is a beautiful marble medallion representing Judith by Gagini, coming from the church of the Annunciation.

Inside the sacristy there are:

- the Founding of the image of Our Lady of Miracles, painting made by Sebastiano Bagolino
- the Nativity of the Virgin Mary, made by Father Felice from Sambuca
- the Immaculate, made by Father Felice from Sambuca too.

== Rites and celebrations ==
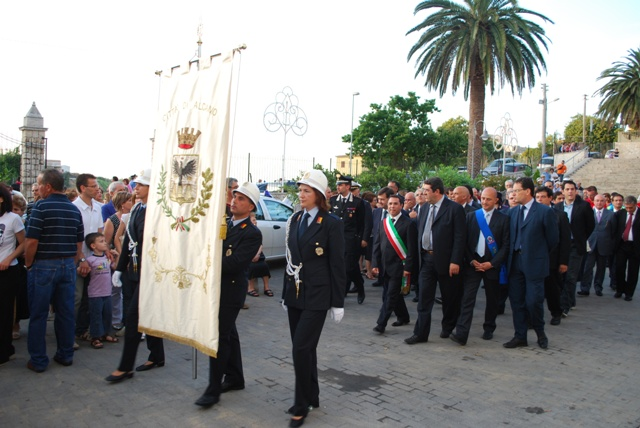
The civil authorities's descent to the sanctuary during the celebrations in honour of Madonna of Miracles.

Traditionally, during the month of May (dedicated to Our Lady), believers go to the sanctuary through the footpath, saying their prayers during the descent. Every year, on 19, 20 and 21 June, inside the Church there are the celebrations in honour of Madonna of Miracles: this is the most important religious feast in Alcamo.

== See also ==
- Alcamo
- Arab fountain of Alcamo
- Our Lady of Miracles
- Sanctuary of Most Holy Mary of the Height

== Sources ==
- Città di Alcamo – Assessorato al Turismo (2002). Alcamo – un itinerario guidato per una città tutta da scoprire...
- Cataldo, Carlo (2001). La conchiglia di S. Giacomo. Alcamo: Edizioni Campo.
- Cataldo, Carlo (1982). Guida storico-artistica dei beni culturali di Alcamo-Calatafimi-Castellammare del Golfo-Salemi-Vita. Alcamo: Edizioni Sarograf.
