= Arab fountain of Alcamo =

Fountain in Alcamo, Italy

Coordinates: 37°59′00″N 12°57′58″E

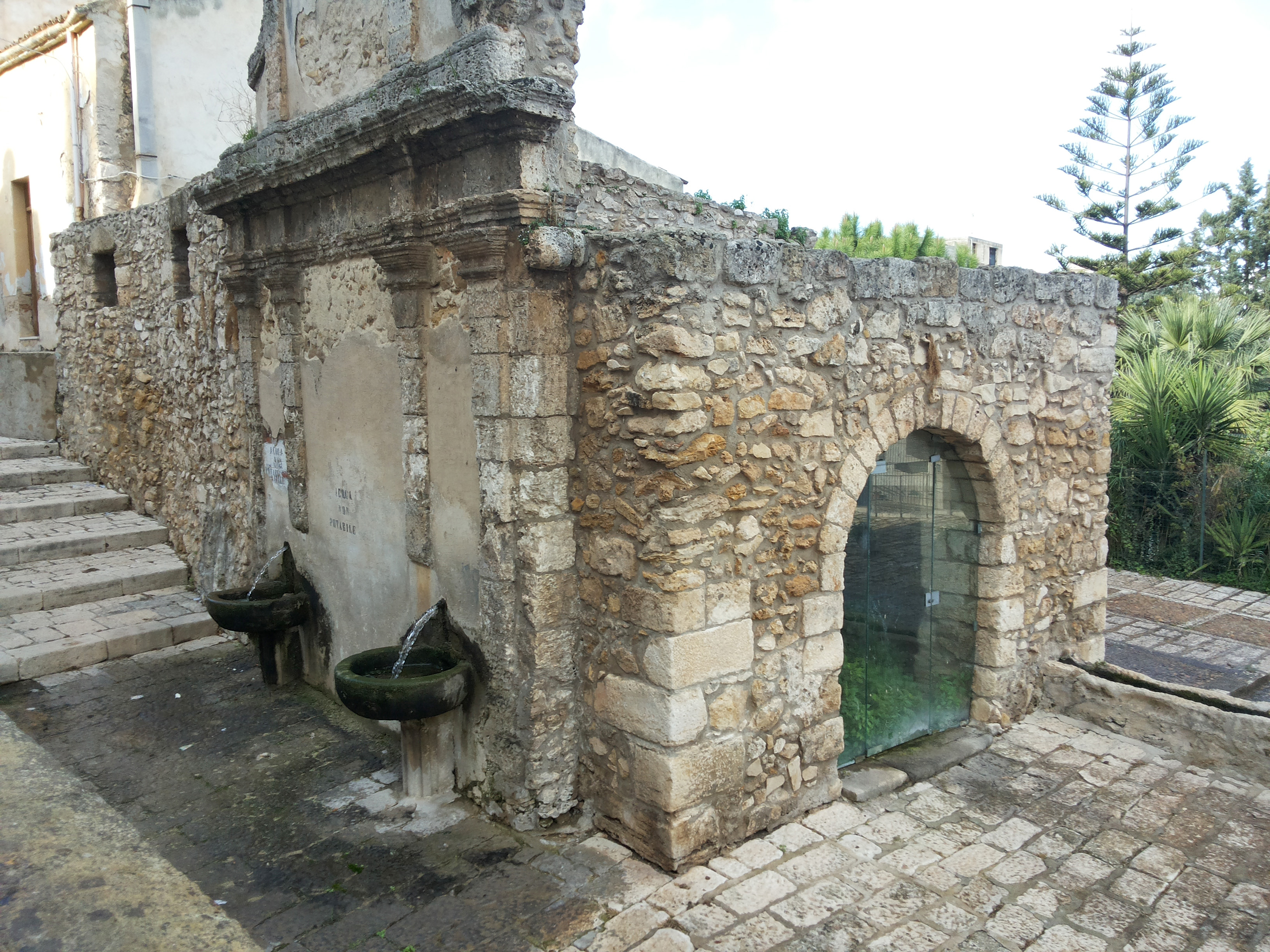
Side view of the fountain

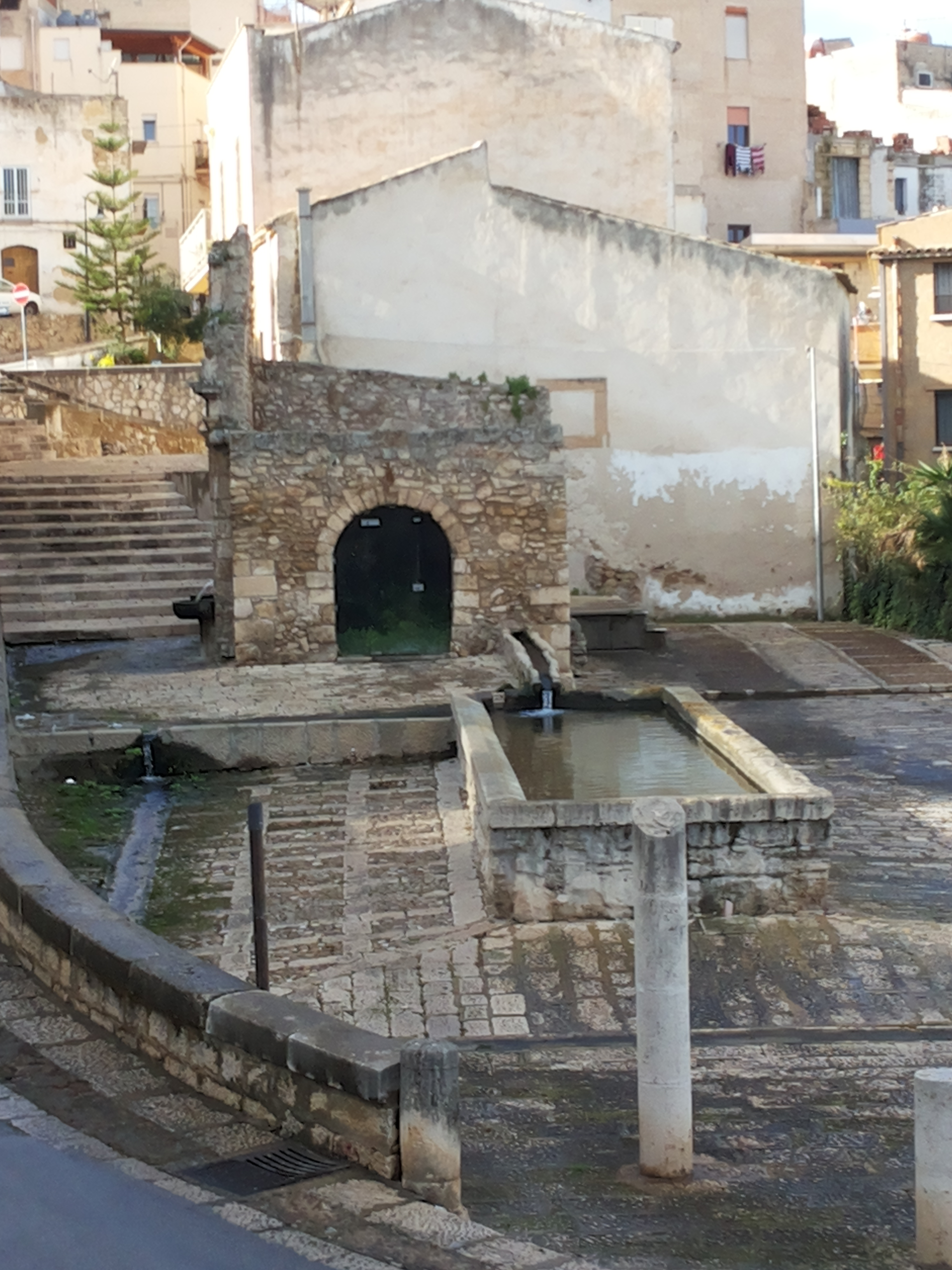
Front view

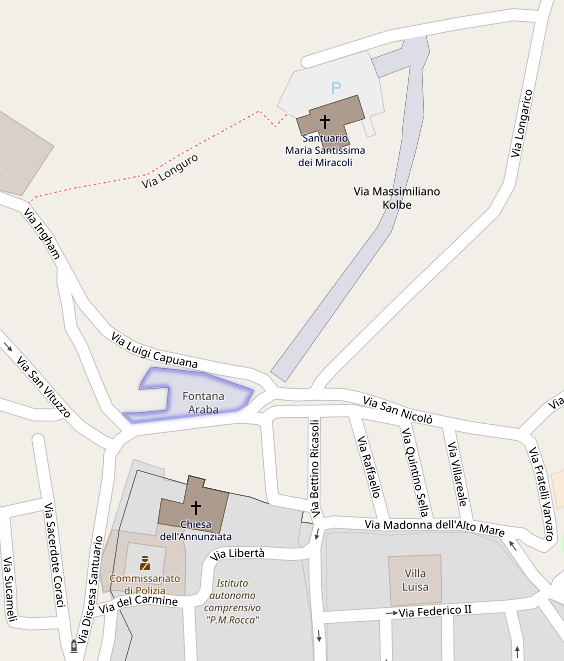
Location of the Fontana Araba and the Sanctuary of Madonna of Miracles within Alcamo

The Arab fountain of Alcamo is very ancient (together with Cuba delle Rose, the Arab Cuba of Vicari and the Piccola Cuba of Palermo), and is still functional: it was built during the period of the Arab domination of the town. It is located in the lower part of Alcamo, at about 300 metres from the Sanctuary of Madonna of Miracles.

== History ==
In 1154, in a passage of the Book of Roger, written by the Arab geographer Idrisi, the town of Alcamo was defined a manzil (that is a casale or group of houses) with fertile lands and a prosperous market. In this period, this hamlet (=casale) was called "Alqamah".

The town centre was inhabited by Muslims and subdivided into four casalia: San Vito, San Leonardo, Sant'Ippolito and San Nicolò del Vauso (which later became feudal hamlets). These casalia became then Christians, after the Arabs were expelled by Frederick II, Holy Roman Emperor because of their rebellions.

The Fountain of San Vito was built by the Arabs near a water spring, in the hamlet of Alqamah; but at the end of the 15th century there was a big earthquake, that probably damaged the fountain, which afterwards was restored. Later the residential area concentrated around the Castle of the Counts of Modica; near the fountain they started the activity of pastoralism which led to the construction of an abreuvoir.

== Description ==
In the façade there are two sinks, with two spouts (cannoli) and lesenes surmounted by capitals. The abreuvoir, realized with carved limestone ashlars, was built in the first half of the 19th century.

The restoration works, completed in 2015, have given a greater valorisation of the characteristic road that, leaving from Piazza Ciullo, leads as far as the Sanctuary of Madonna of Miracles, where in May believers go there on pilgrimage to pray their patroness.

=== Restoration ===
Thanks to the fundings received through G.A.L. (gruppo di azione locale), aimed to the requalification of the cultural sites in the rural landscape of the territory of Alcamo (among which there are also the Cuba delle Rose and the holy aedicules), they could restore and valorize the site of the ancient Arab fountain; the planning was predisposed by the engineers of the municipality of Alcamo.

== Sources ==
- Regina, Vincenzo (1972). Profilo storico di Alcamo e sue opere d'arte dalle origini al secolo XV. Alcamo: Edizioni Accademia di Studi "Cielo d'Alcamo".
- "ALCAMO in "Enciclopedia Italiana"". treccani.it.
- Calia, Roberto (1991). Una città da scoprire: Alcamo. Alcamo: Edizioni Blu Imaging & ADV.
- Orlandi, Cesare (1770). Delle città d'Italia e sue isole adjacenti compendiose notizie.
- Orlandi, Conte Cesare (1770). Delle città d'Italia e sue isole adjacenti compendiose notizie.
- "Itinerari artistici". Archived from the original on 2015-04-03.
- "Lunedì inaugurazione della Fontana Araba ad Alcamo". 7 May 2015.
- "Alcamo: La cuba delle rose e la Fontana Araba". Archived from the original on 2018-04-15.
