= Santissima Annunziata, Alcamo =

Church building in Alcamo, Italy

Coordinates: 37.9828°N 12.9660°E

Santissima Annunziata
- Chiesa dell'Annunziata
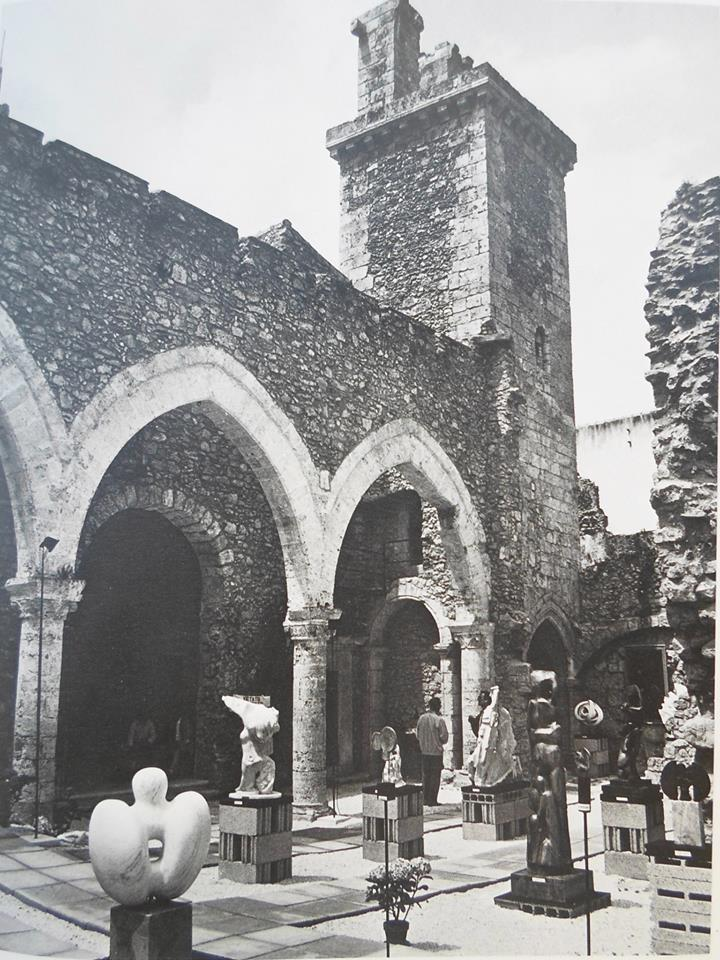
- The interior of the church during an art exhibition

Religion
- Affiliation: Catholic
- Province: province of Trapani
- Region: Sicily

Location
- Location: Alcamo, province of Trapani, Italy
- State: Italy
- Interactive map of Santissima Annunziata
- Territory: Alcamo

The Santissima Annunziata ('Most Holy Annunciation'), also known as the Church of Carmine, is a Catholic church in Gothic-Catalan style and its remains can be seen in Alcamo, in Trapani province. One can visit the church and the adjoining convent of the Carmelites (today the police station’s premises) in Piazza Libertà.

== History ==
The original body of the church was built during the Aragonese rule in Sicily, probably between 1332 and 1379, although it would in all likelihood date back to 1032. The church has gone through various enlargements, re-adaptations, and changes during the centuries, particularly in the 16th and 17th.

The square bell tower, located on the right side of the entrance, was realised at the beginning of the 15th century, and was accessible from the church. Beginning in the 16th century, they started a second elevation and later would build a music stand leaning on an arch, and stretching from the bell tower as far as the new protruding chapel. In this fashion, the decorations above the door and the circular window were cut and a colonnade was created in front of the church.

Around the 16th century in the Church, there was the Confraternity of Saint Blaise, which probably converged later in the Confraternity of the Annunciation.

In 1537, the oratory adjoining the church was rebuilt by the Confraternity of Maria Santissima Annunziata. In 1752, this confraternity was promoted a company.

Further to the abolition of religious orders in 1866, the Carmelites were expelled from the convent, which was transformed into barracks, while the church was neglected. The friars tried to get it back again, but the negotiations dragged on and, when the government decided to give it back, the roof had fallen down and the church had already ruined as from the end of the 19th century.

In 1950, the Confraternity of Maria Santissima Annunziata passed to the church of Saint Olivia and it reassumed the title of confraternity in 1954, but it came to an end a short time after.

The church, which is usually closed to public, is often used for cultural events, mainly exhibitions and concerts.

== Description and works ==
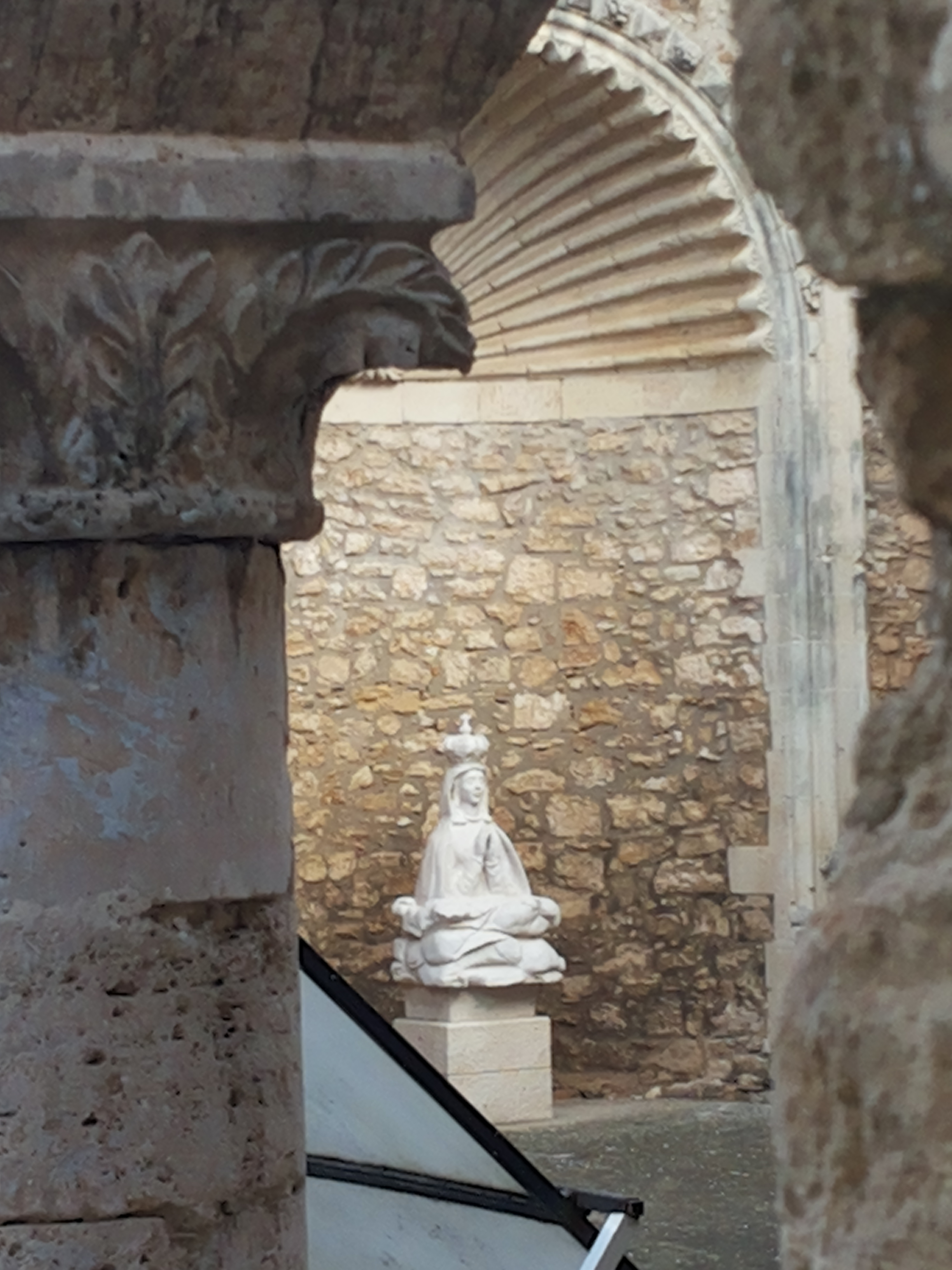
Details of a column and an apse inside the church.

The church, with a trapezoidal plan, had a nave and two aisles separated by two rows of tuff columns, with very low capitals decorated with floral forms and animals, each one different from the other. Each row of columns was surmounted by five pointed arches of Catalan and Italic style (called “a terzo punto”). Today from the original structure there are only a series of columns on the right nave) and some chapels enriched by precious decorative elements. The wooden saddle roof, which was higher above the presbytery, does not exist any longer.

At the end of the church there are three apses, also surmounted by pointed arches.

The three naves are separated by three arches from the presbytery, which is a step higher than the floor of the naves. Under the presbytery there is a crypt used for public sepulchre. Its entrance is next to the elevated step. Inside this crypt there is a painting of the Holy Crucified.

The front door has two large decorative fillets adorned with intaglios representing leaf work of Norman style. On the façade above the door there is a circular perforated window; on the right side of the door you can see a bell tower dating back to the 15th century.

The church walls and pillars were decorated with frescoes: most of them are not visible now because of an incautious whitewashing of the walls. Above all they have discovered the images of a monk and a crucifix.

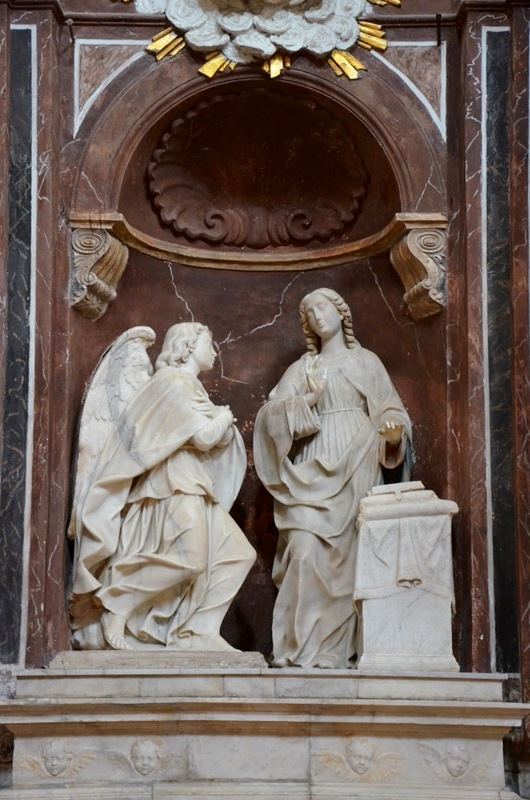
The Annunciation by the Gagini, hosted in church of Saint Olivia.

On the high altar there was a white marble sculpture entitled “The Annunciation” representing the kneeling Virgin with the Archangel Gabriel next to her and the Holy Father above them. This work was realized in 1545 by Antonino Gagini and Giacomo Gagini. In 1906 it was placed in Saint Olivia's Church, while the statue of Madonna of Carmelo, realized in paper pulp and carried in procession by the friars, is hosted inside Saints Paul and Bartholomew's Church.

According to Father Facciponte, a Jesuit, very probably the white alabaster holy water stoup, with bas-reliefs representing the Announcer Angel and the Virgin, which today are inside the Church of the College of Jesuits or church of Jesus, probably come from this church too.

== Sources ==
- Regina, Vincenzo (1972). Profilo storico di Alcamo e sue opere d'arte dalle origini al secolo XV (in Italian). Alcamo: Edizioni Accademia di Studi "Cielo d'Alcamo". Regina.
- Cataldo, Carlo (2001). La conchiglia di S. Giacomo (in Italian). Alcamo: Edizioni Campo. Cataldo.
