= Santissima Trinità, Alcamo =

Roman Catholic church in Alcamo, Italy

Santissima Trinità
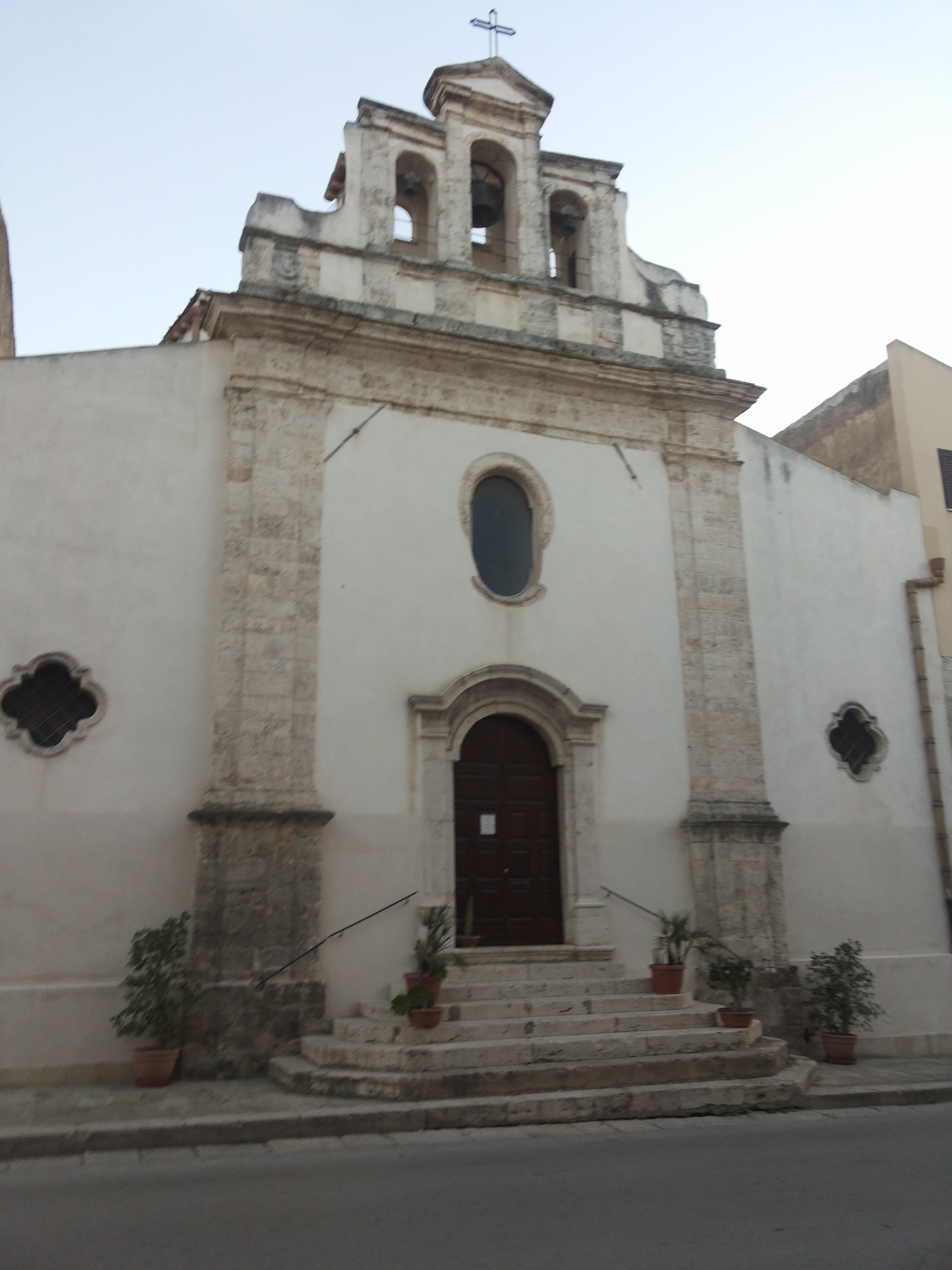
- The façade

Religion
- Affiliation: Catholic
- Province: Trapani
- Region: Sicily
- Rite: Catholic
- Patron: Santissima Trinità
- Year consecrated: 1757

Location
- Location: Alcamo, Trapani, Italy
- Municipality: Alcamo
- State: Italy
- Interactive map of Santissima Trinità
- Coordinates: 37°58′44″N 12°57′58″E

Architecture
- Funded by: Angelo di Poto
- Groundbreaking: 1746

Santissima Trinità ("Holy Trinity") is a Catholic church in Alcamo, in the province of Trapani.

== History ==
The church was founded in 1552 by Angelo di Poto, a clergyman, on a piece of land given by the municipality, and it was a Parish from 1615 to 1639. The present one was built between 1746 and 1757, in substitution of another Church which stood at the north-eastern corner of the crossing between via Santissimo Salvatore and via Trinità.

In 1571 they founded the homonymous Confraternity, which was assigned the Church by the General Vicar; its brethren had to say the Liturgy of the Hours, three times a year, on Christmas, on Easter and Pentecost. It was existing until 1615, when the Church was elected a Parish and its brethren left it.

They associated some benefits and revenues (such as the Church of Saint Michael the Archangel, the Church of Saint Catherine and the Church of Our Lady of the Chain) to this Church in order to have a certain financial autonomy.

On October 13, 1639, when there was the pastoral Visit of the new bishop of Mazara del Vallo (Don Giovanni Domenico Spinola), and he noticed that the new two parishes of Santissima Trinità and Saint Paul had financial difficulties, suppressed the parish of Santissima Trinità. This choice was due to the fact that the town was expanding along Corso 6 Aprile, towards the Saints Paul and Bartholomew's Church.

In the Church only the night Congregation remained, but its members, noticing that their Church was going to ruin as time was passing by, decided to leave it and build a new one on the plain in front of it in 1746.

The new Church was consecrated in 1757 and in 1771 it was embellished with stuccoes.

== Description and works ==
The Church is with a nave, three altars and a small chapel.

Inside it there are the following works:

- The Most Holy Trinity: a painting, probable work of the 17th century, representing the Holy Trinity, on the high altar
- Mary Help of Christians (Maria Santissima Ausiliatrice) with Saint Giovanni Bosco, a painting made in 1943 by the Franciscan Sisters of Mary in Rome
- The Holy Heart of Jesus (Sacro Cuore di Gesù), a painting made in 1943 by the Franciscan Sisters of Mary in Rome
- Our Lady of Sorrows, a statue placed in a small chapel on the left.

== See also ==
- Catholic Church in Italy

== Sources ==
- Carlo Cataldo, Guida storico-artistica dei beni culturali di Alcamo-Calatafimi-Cstellammare Golfo, p. 33, Sarograf, Alcamo, 1982.
- Bembina G. B.- Alcamo sacra, con note di Francesco Maria Mirabella, Pietro Maria Rocca; edizioni Accademia di Studi "Cielo D'Alcamo", Alcamo, 1956
