= Filippo Pennino =

Italian sculptor

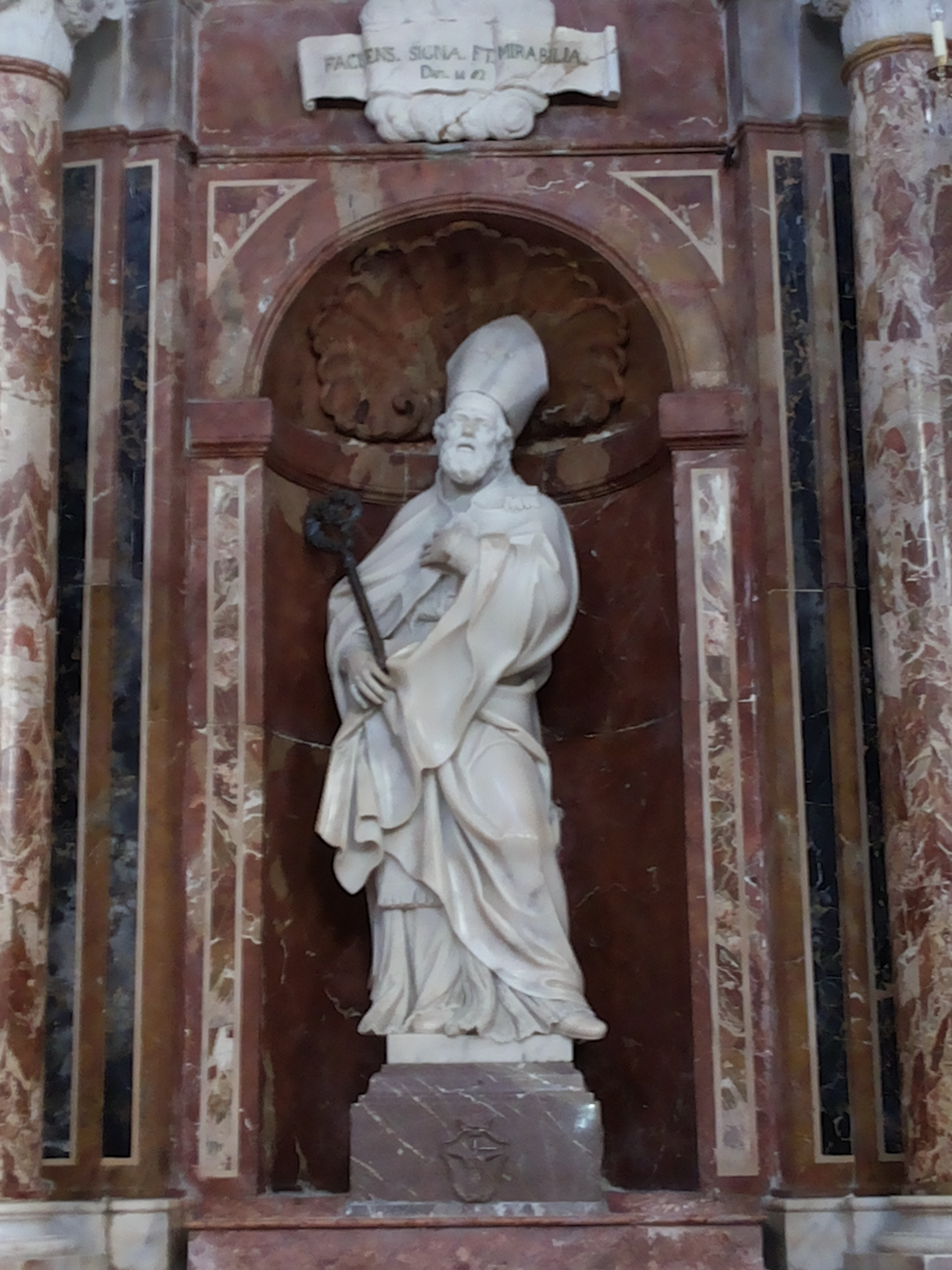
"Sant'Eligio", sculpture by Filippo Pennino, located in Alcamo (Italy).

Filippo Pennino (1755-1801) was an Italian sculptor.

Pennino was born, lived and worked in Palermo. Most of what is known about his life is through his works. He carved the Fountain with Triton and Puttini at Villa Trabia in Bagheria and the Angel at the entrance to the local Oratory of Saint Philip Neri church. In 1763 he carved a tomb for the Church of St. James in Bivona. He also carved funerary monuments, among which one was dedicated to Mallia at the church Chiesa madre in Gela. One of his final works before he died was in the first bay Chapel of the Baptistery of the Palermo Cathedral where he sculpted an octagonal baptismal font in 1801 along with his son Gaetano Pennino, who Filippo trained to be a sculptor.
