= Our Lady of Miracles =

Sicilian patron saint

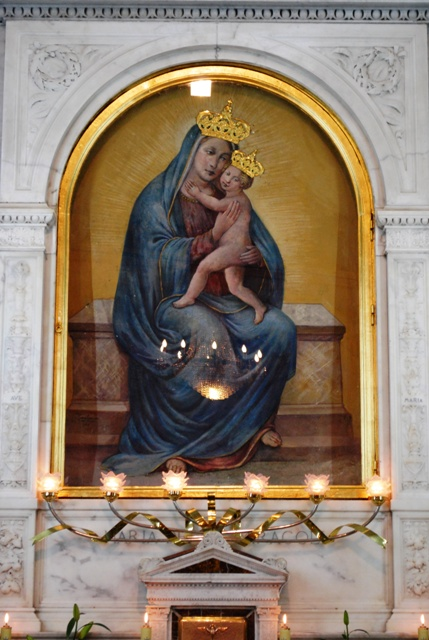
The image of Our Lady of Miracles hosted at the Sanctuary of Madonna of Miracles in Alcamo.

Our Lady of Miracles (or Madonna of Miracles) is the patroness saint of the town of Alcamo.

== Historical hints ==
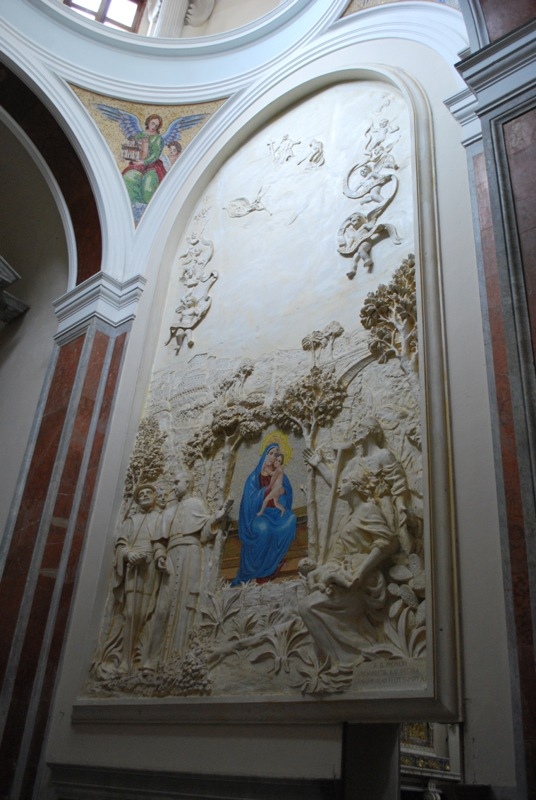
A representation of the discovery of Our Lady of Miracles' image (inside its chapel in the Basilica of Our Lady of the Assumption in Alcamo).

The cult of Madonna of Miracles in Alcamo dates back to 21 June 1547, the day people remember the Madonna's apparition to some women near a stream running north of Alcamo.

According to tradition while washing their clothes in the torrent, the women, with a blind and a deaf one among them, saw the apparition of a woman with a child and were hit by a gust of pebbles moved during the apparition, but without getting any injury or pain; on the contrary, after being hit by the pebbles, they strangely felt a certain sense of wellbeing and recovered their health. After learning the news, the women's husbands, thinking that it was a joke, went to investigate about the event, thinking that someone was hidden among the bushes around there, but they didn't find anybody.

Then the local authorities inquired on the spot, cut down the near grove and found the ruins of a "cuba", an old arc of a mill that nobody remembered any longer, and inside there was a fresco on a stone made by an anonymous painter of the 13th century representing Our Lady with the Child Jesus, which at first the believers called "Madonna Fons Misericordiae" (that is Our Lady Source of Mercy).

After this discovery all the people started praying before the image rediscovered and in the following days there were several miracles.

Then since 1547, Our Lady of Miracles became the patroness saint of Alcamo, in substitution of the Holy Crucified, who was the patron saint of Alcamo and other near small towns (among which Calatafimi and Salemi). The old patron saint's memory however remains in Alcamo people's mind: in fact they call San Francesco di Paola "santu patri" (whose translation means "patron saint") as the Church named after him was called the Holy Crucified Church.

The Madonna's discovered image was first called "Our Lady Source of Mercy”, but thanks to the high number of subsequent miracles, in 1583 the name was changed into "Our Lady of Miracles".

Further to these events, Don Fernando Vega, Alcamo's governor and justice captain, ordered the construction of the Sanctuary of Our Lady of Miracles, which hosts the Madonna's image. Inside the Church there is a white marble sarcophagus containing the mortal remains of the governor Don Fernando Vega, according to his will.

== Celebrations ==
Every year in Alcamo there are the celebrations in honour of Our Lady of Miracles since 19 June until 21 of June. This is the most important religious and folkloristic festivity in Alcamo. The real celebrations are often anticipated by other events, so extending the feast to about two weeks, in this way the beginning of the celebrations changes every year, while the last day is always the 21 of June.

The celebrations include:

- "The pealing of church bells" which opens the celebrations together with the burst of crackers and the passing of the band through the town streets; in the past Alcamo's band also joined the musical band of Partinico (a neighbouring small town).
- The holy Mass in honour of Our Lady of Miracles in the Basilica di Santa Maria Assunta (also called "mother church"), in which all confraternities and laical groups in Alcamo take part.
- The descent to the Sanctuary of Madonna of Miracles (called "calata"), in which all civil and religious authorities of the town (together with the Mayor) take part; they are preceded by the band and the gonfalon of the town. In old times people took also the animals that had recovered from an illness. Inside the sanctuary they sing Vespers and then there is the Eucharistic Blessing.
- Dance, music and theatrical performances.
- Sport events.
- Exhibitions of various kinds, including one about local Craftmanship.
- "The Market Fair" at Piazza della Repubblica.
- The Streets entertainers' (called "madonnari") festival.
- The Procession of Our Lady of Miracles' statue along the town streets and return to the mother church. Before this solemn procession, the statue of Our Lady of Miracles, realized in 1720 by Lorenzo Curti from Castelvetrano, is adorned with a silver star crown ("stellario" in Italian), a crown and a hairpin embellished by precious stones (called "tuppu di la Maronna") which is placed behind the Madonna's nape. After that the statue goes out from the Church, taken along the streets by a group of believers on their shoulders and accompanied by the band and it comes back to the mother church at the end of the procession.
- Fireworks near the so-called "bastione" in Piazza Bagolino. They take place at the end of the feast, soon after the statue's return into the church, at about midnight.

The traditional descent to the sanctuary is put on during the so-called "Historical Cortege" with period costumes. This cortege, which anticipates the real "calata", passes through Corso 6 Aprile and Piazza Ciullo, and finally ends at the Castle of the Counts of Modica (also called "Castle of Alcamo"). The workmen of the association "I Cavalieri di San Giorgio" (San Giorgio's knights). take part in the cortege too.

In the past there were the horse races along Corso 6 Aprile too (and in the last years also in Viale Italia), but this tradition (called "Palio di Alcamo") was then interrupted owing to the requests done by the Associazione Nazionale Tutela Animali, the International Organization for Animal Protection and by the Observatory Zoomafia of Lega anti vivisezione, (organizations which protect animals) that denounced the abuses animals suffered and the presence of people involved in illicit activities.

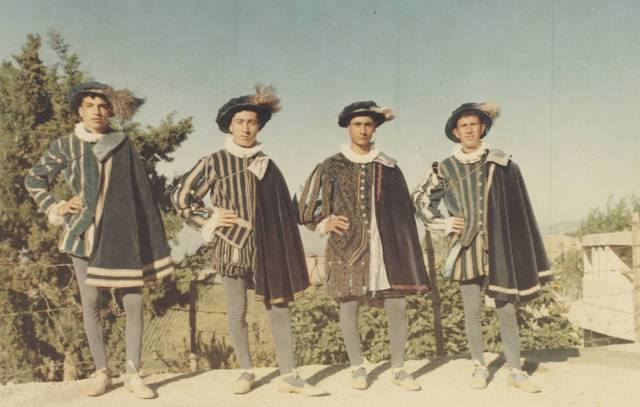
Costumes of "I Cavalieri di San Giorgio" worn during the historical cortege (1966).

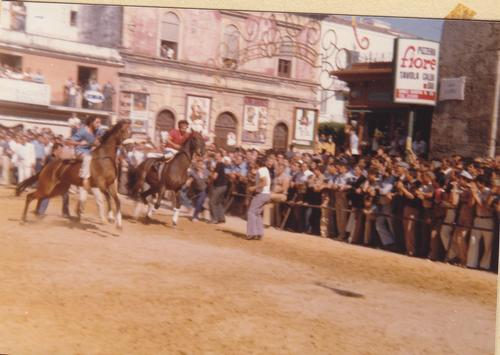
Horse races in Corso 6 Aprile (1979).

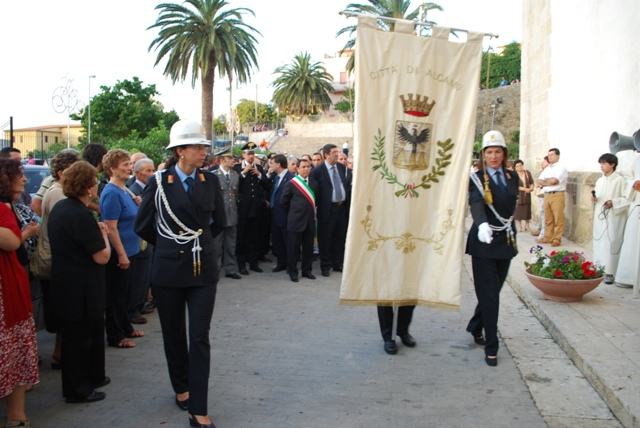
The Descent to the sanctuary.

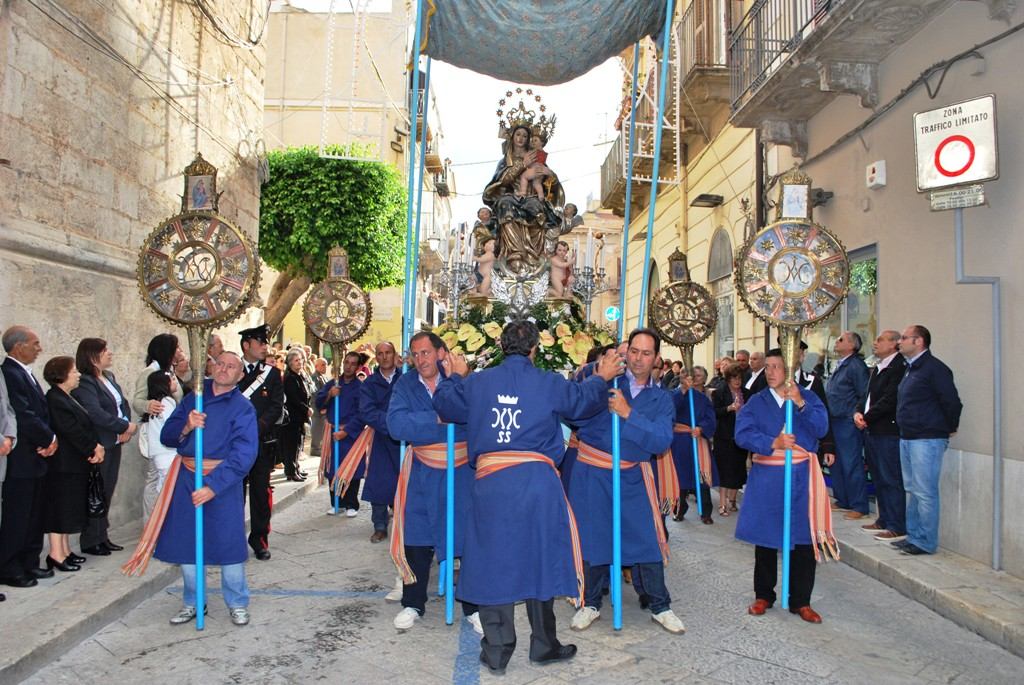
The solemn procession of Our Lady of Miracles' statue.

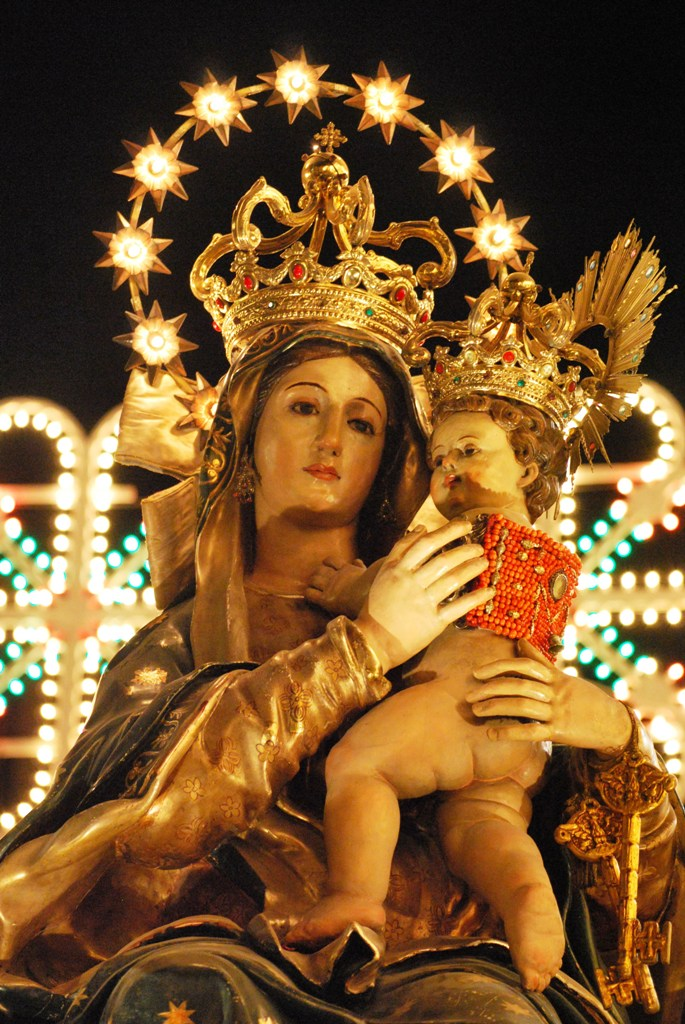
Our Lady of Miracles' statue before the solemn procession.

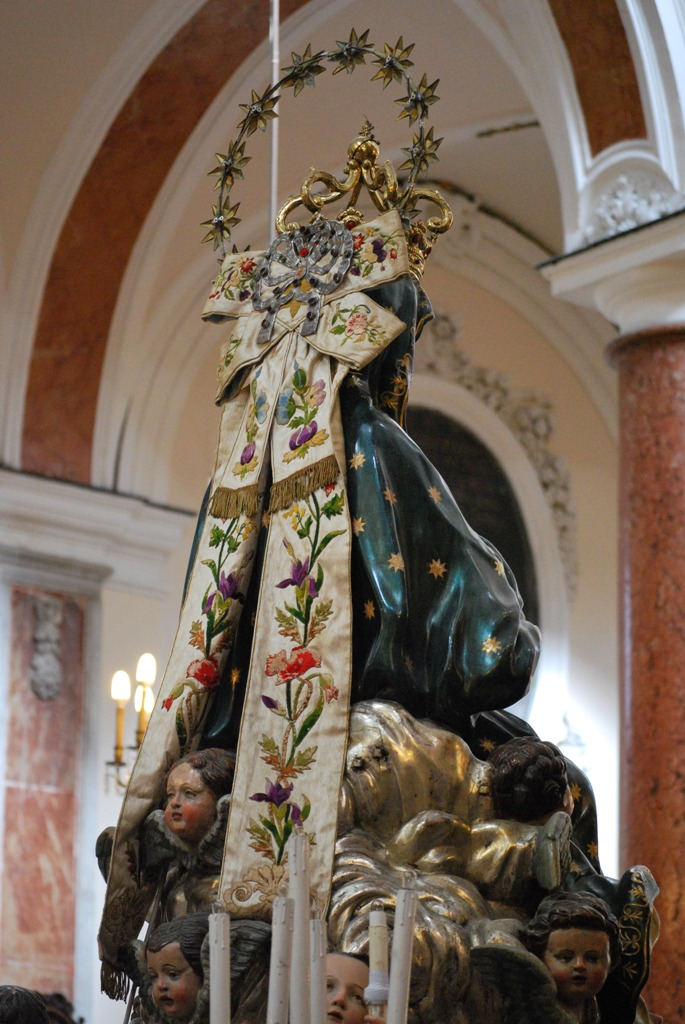
"Tuppu di la Maronna"

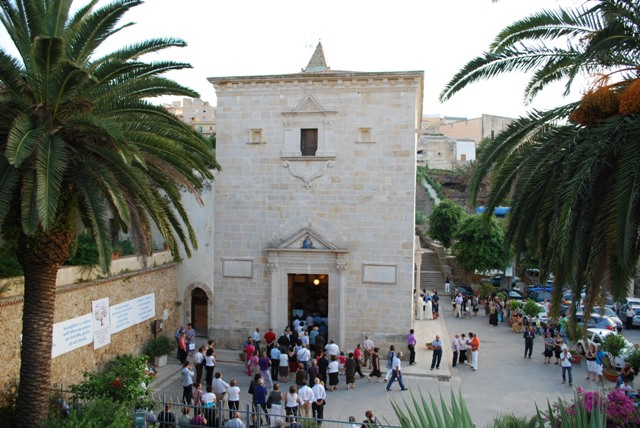
The Sanctuary of Madonna of Miracles during the traditional "calata" (descent).

== Penitential Procession ==
Since 1615, the year in which Alcamo was seriously hit by pestilence, there is the so-called "Penitential procession" of Madonna of Miracles. It takes place on the third Sunday of Lent: the Madonna's statue is brought from the Basilica of Our Lady's Assumption to the Church of Saints Paul and Bartholomew, where it remains for a week and is solemnized, then it goes back to the mother church.

== See also ==
- Sanctuary of Madonna of Miracles
- Basilica of Our Lady of the Assumption (Alcamo)
