= Santi Paolo e Bartolomeo, Alcamo =

17th-century church in Alcamo, Italy

Santi Paolo e Bartolomeo
- Chiesa dei Santi Paolo e Bartolomeo
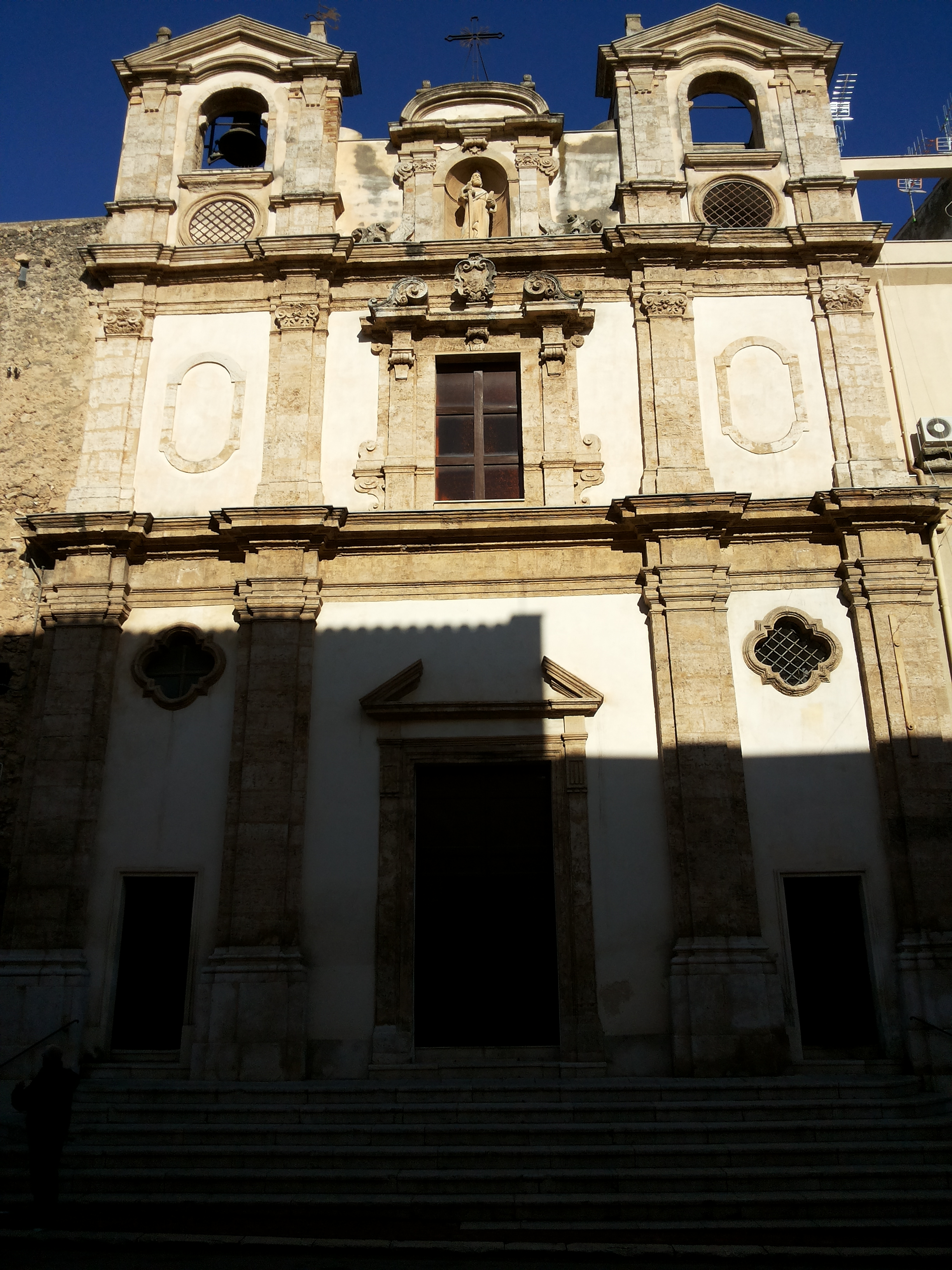
- Saints Paul and Bartholomew's Church façade

Religion
- Affiliation: Catholic
- Province: Trapani
- Region: Sicily

Location
- Location: Alcamo, Trapani, Italy
- State: Italy
- Interactive map of Santi Paolo e Bartolomeo
- Territory: Alcamo
- Coordinates: 37.9805°N 12.9616°E

Architecture
- Style: Baroque

Website
- http://www.parrocchie.it/alcamo/sanpaolo/

Santi Paolo e Bartolomeo ('Saints Paul and Bartholomew') is a 17th-century baroque style church located in Alcamo, in the province of Trapani, Sicily, southern Italy.

== History ==
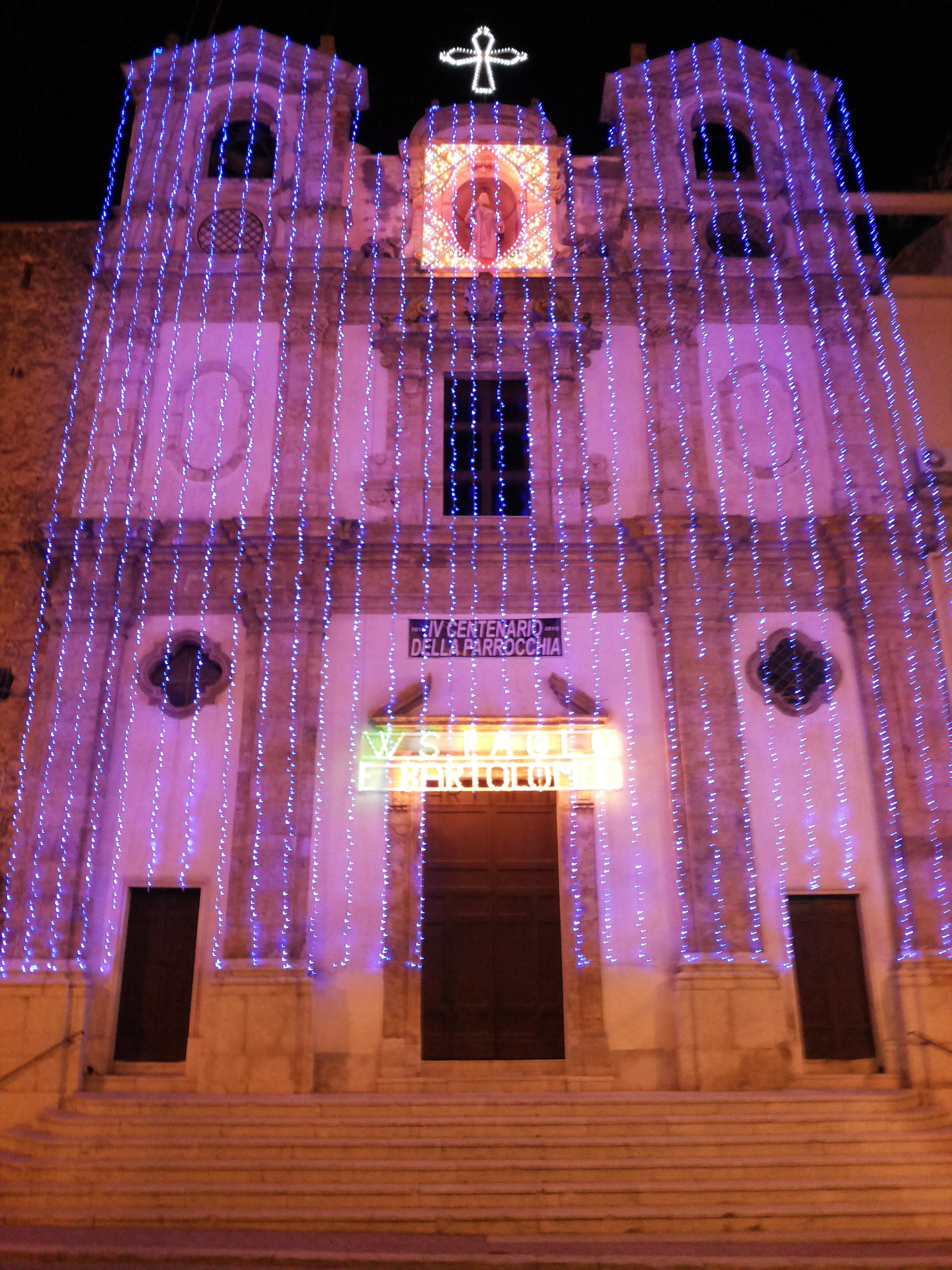
Façade of the Church of the Saints Paul and Bartholomew on the 4th century of its foundation

In 1533, Don Adamo Morfino, further to a vow promise, started the construction of a hospital for sick and incurable people with a contiguous chapel dedicated to Saint Paul in Conversion, which was then situated at the end of the present Corso VI Aprile (called "Corso Imperiale" at that time). This building, necessary because of the high number of inhabitants requiring medical treatment, wasn't entirely completed and was stopped in 1590 because there were no funds.

In obedience to the will of the bishop of Mazara of the time, since 1615 they began the construction of the Parish Church of "Saint Paul in Conversion" by enlarging the previous chapel of Saint Paul in Conversion. The same bishop got to build, simultaneously, the church of the Holy Trinity which in 1639 was aggregated to the first one to remedy the lack of income.

In 1689, the Church was demolished and rebuilt thanks to the believers' offerings; its construction was completed in 1692. Afterwards, as there was money availability given by some believers (in particular the rich owner Mariano Balli), the Church was further enlarged (1702-1705), and they finished the dome.

Between 1775 and 1809, they completed the façade, built the Holy Sacrament's side chapel, the chapel of Madonna of Miracles (Alcamo's patron saint) and an anti-sacristy. During this period (in 1778 to be precise) a copper clock was also placed on the bell tower in the left side of the façade (looking from the outside), replaced in 1846 by a steel one and definitely removed in 1910 as it didn't work any longer. In 1916, the other clock of the bell towers on the façade was restored.

After the 1968 Belice earthquake, they restored some parts of the façade, removing the lime and the plaster which had been added during the maintenance works done in the past.

== Description and works ==
The church, with a Latin cross plan, has got three naves, with a door associated to each one in the façade (a central and two side ones).

On the façade, realized on a design made by Emanuele Cardona, there are two bell towers, with four bells weighing 20 quintals on the whole, one of them was used for the running of the clock which does not exist any longer.

The naves are divided by two rows of four columns made with monolithic marble from monte Bonifato, leaning on quadrangular bases. The apse has got an eye window, where they added a wrought iron cross in 1927.

Inside the Church there are the Baptistry and two altars in the smaller naves (the altar of Madonna with the Seven Angels on the right and Saint Bartholomew's altar on the left).There are also the following chapels:

- The Madonna of Honey's chapel (Madonna del Miele) and the Holy Sacrament's chapel in the transept;
- The Madonna of Pompei's chapel and the Holy Sacrament's chapel next to the presbytery.

On the apse there is Saints Paul and Bartholomew's painting, made by Giuseppe Felice in 1701. In the chapel of Madonna of Honey there is a painting of Madonna of Honey dating back to about 1300; this is the most ancient painting in Alcamo and is ascribed to Barnaba of Modena.

The stuccoes inside the Church were realized by Vincenzo and Gabriele Messina, and the frescoes by Antonio Grano. Inside the sacristy there is a painting which represents the Holy Heart of Jesus made by Giuseppe Carta in 1858, and of the Holy Heart of Jesus, carved in 1932 by Giuseppe Ospedale on behalf of the Congregation with the same name: it was carried out in procession at the end of July.

In the antisagresty there is another painting, made by Giuseppe Carrera in 1610, representing San Nicolò da Tolentino kneeling in front of an altar in a dark room, and a wooden statue of Madonna del Miele, carved in 1846 by Giovanni Stellino. It was venerated on the altar until 1903 and was restored a few years ago by Maria Rosa Puma. In the office there are:

- Our Lady of Miracles, a painting made on zinc
- A baroque wooden scaffarrata: inside it there is a Child Jesus holding his right hand on his chest, while the left one is sustaining a blood-red heart. He has three necklaces, one made with coral, the second with pearls, and the third one with a golden crucifix. On the two sides there are two angels.
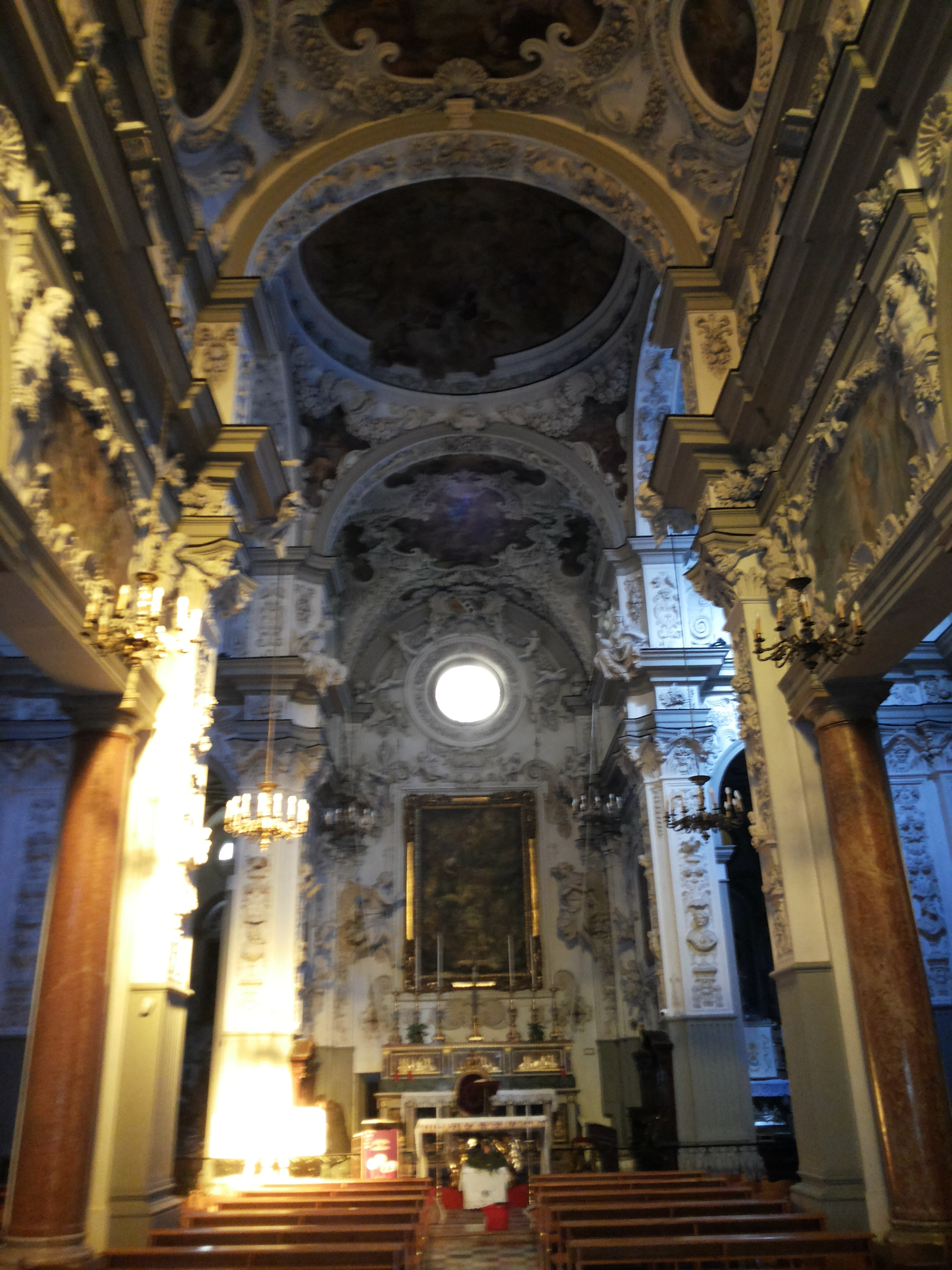
Apse with an eye window

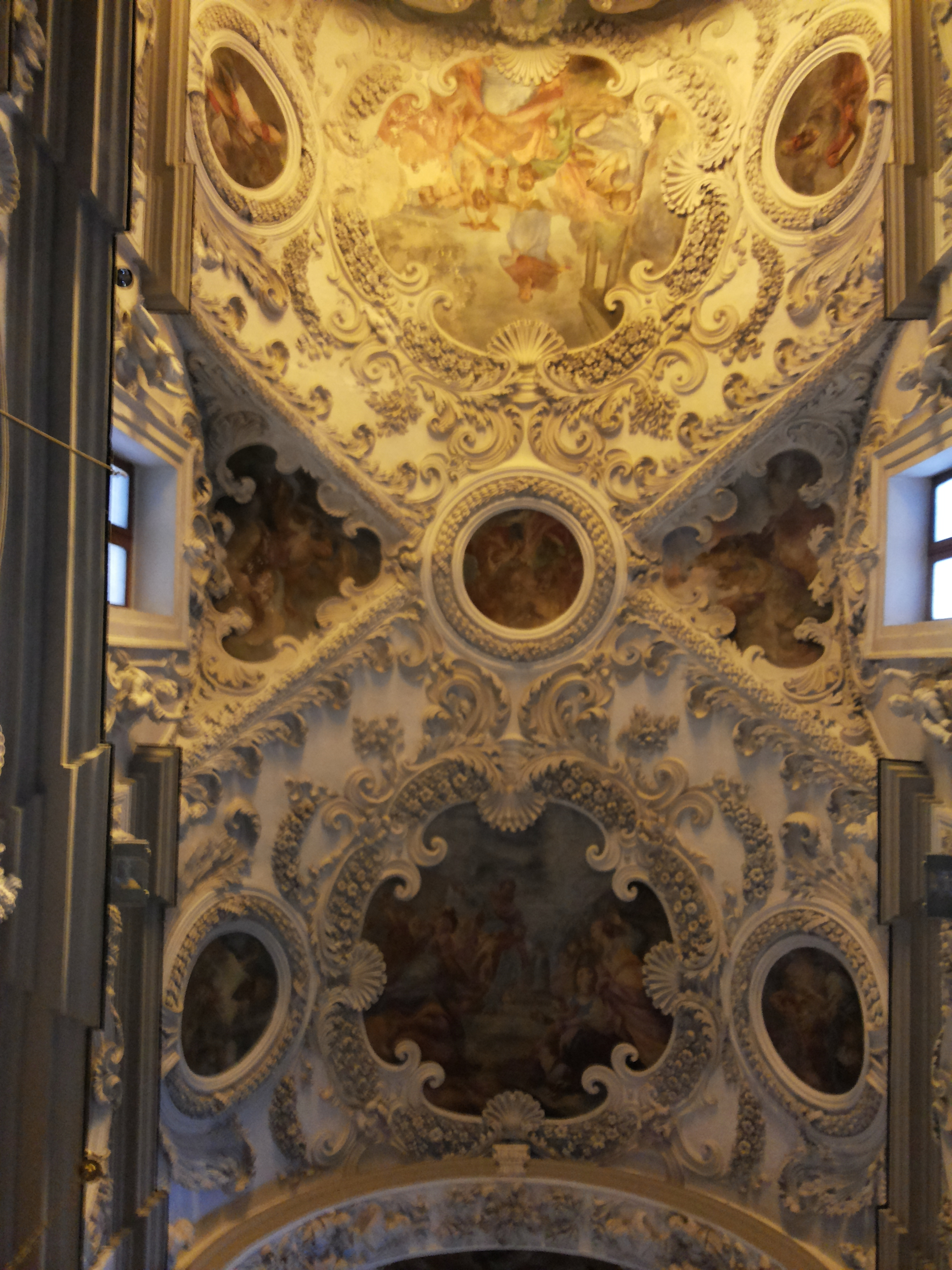
Baroque ceiling decorated with stuccoes and paintings

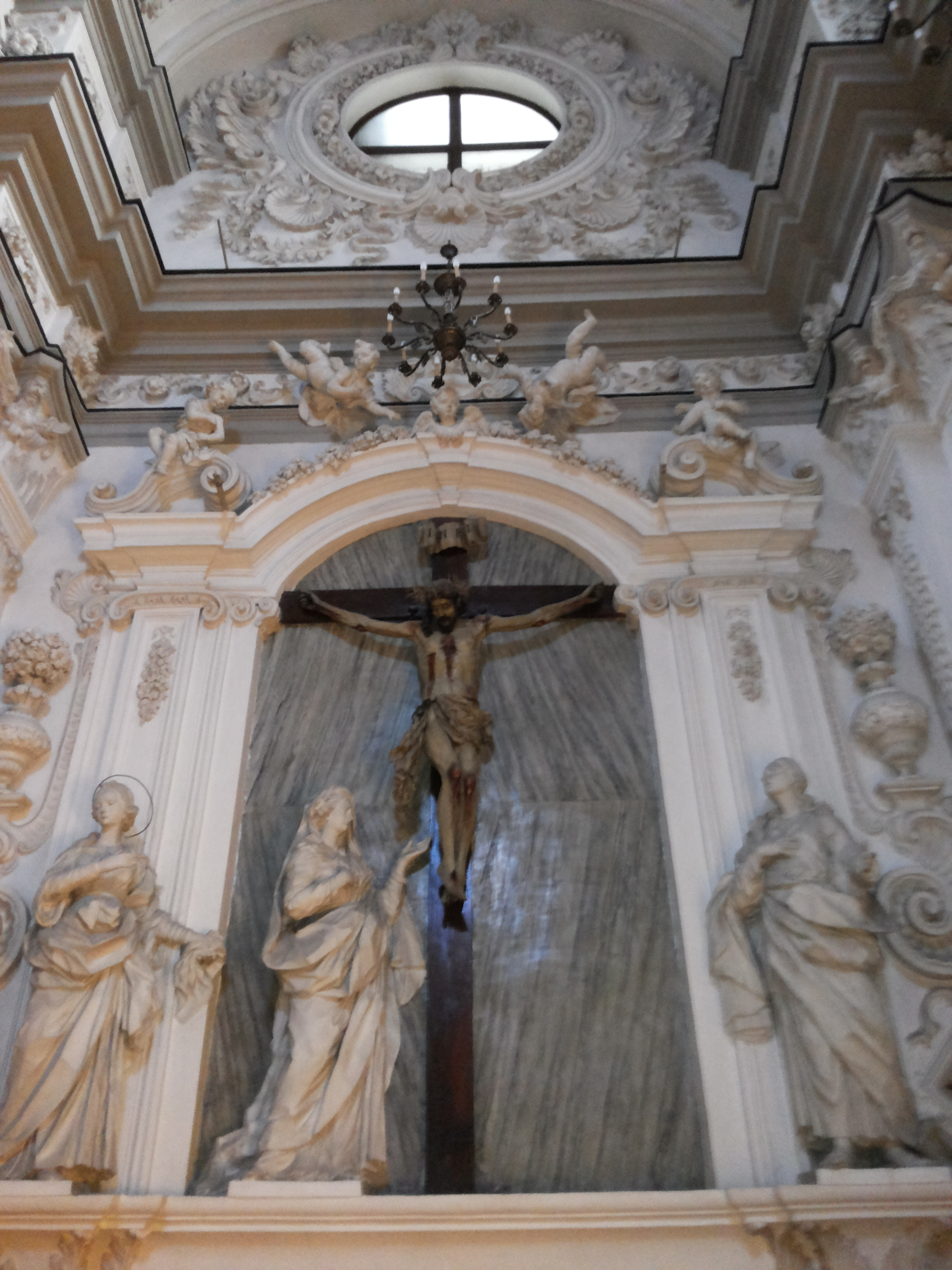
The Holy Crucified's chapel

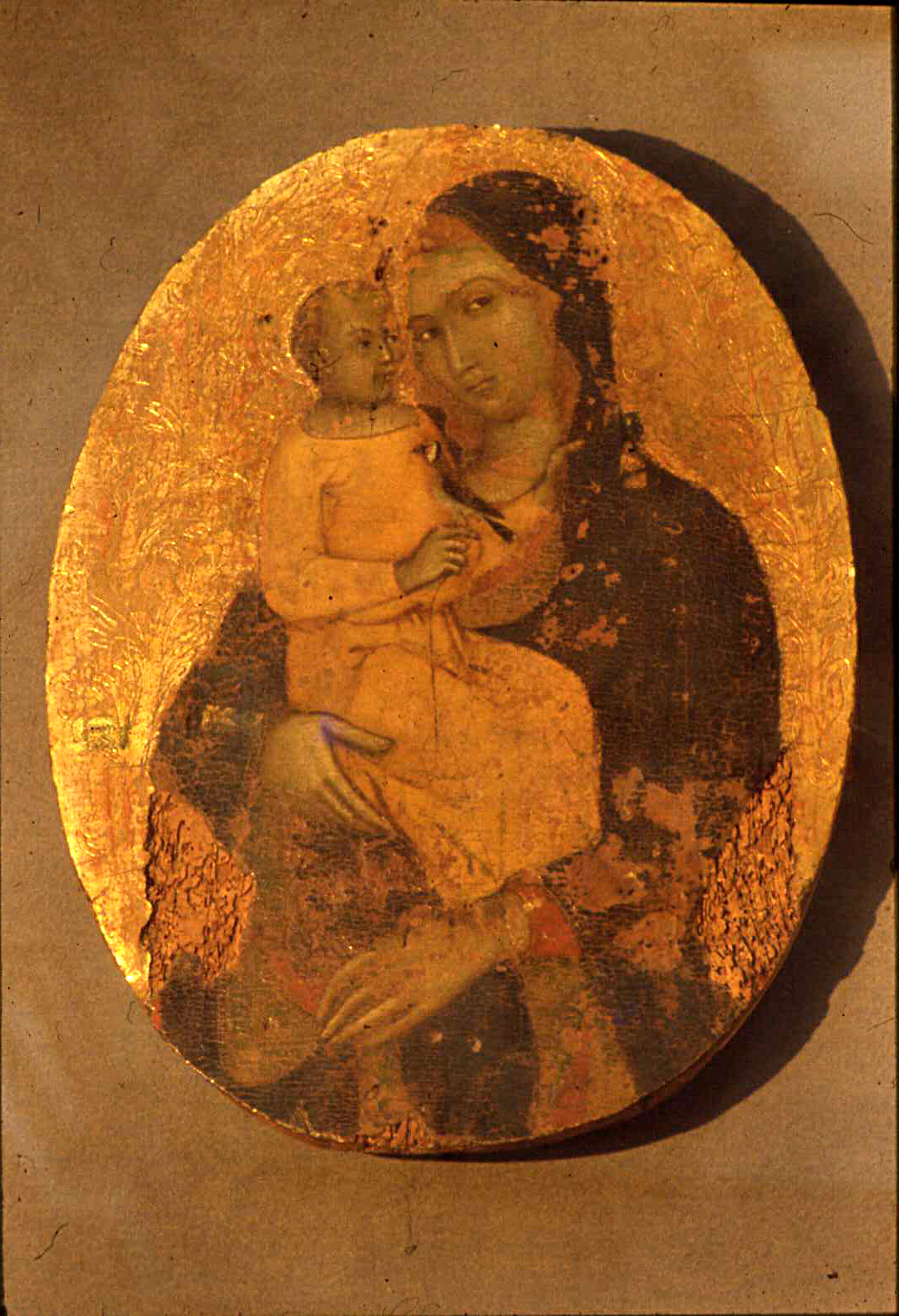
The painting of Our Lady of Honey

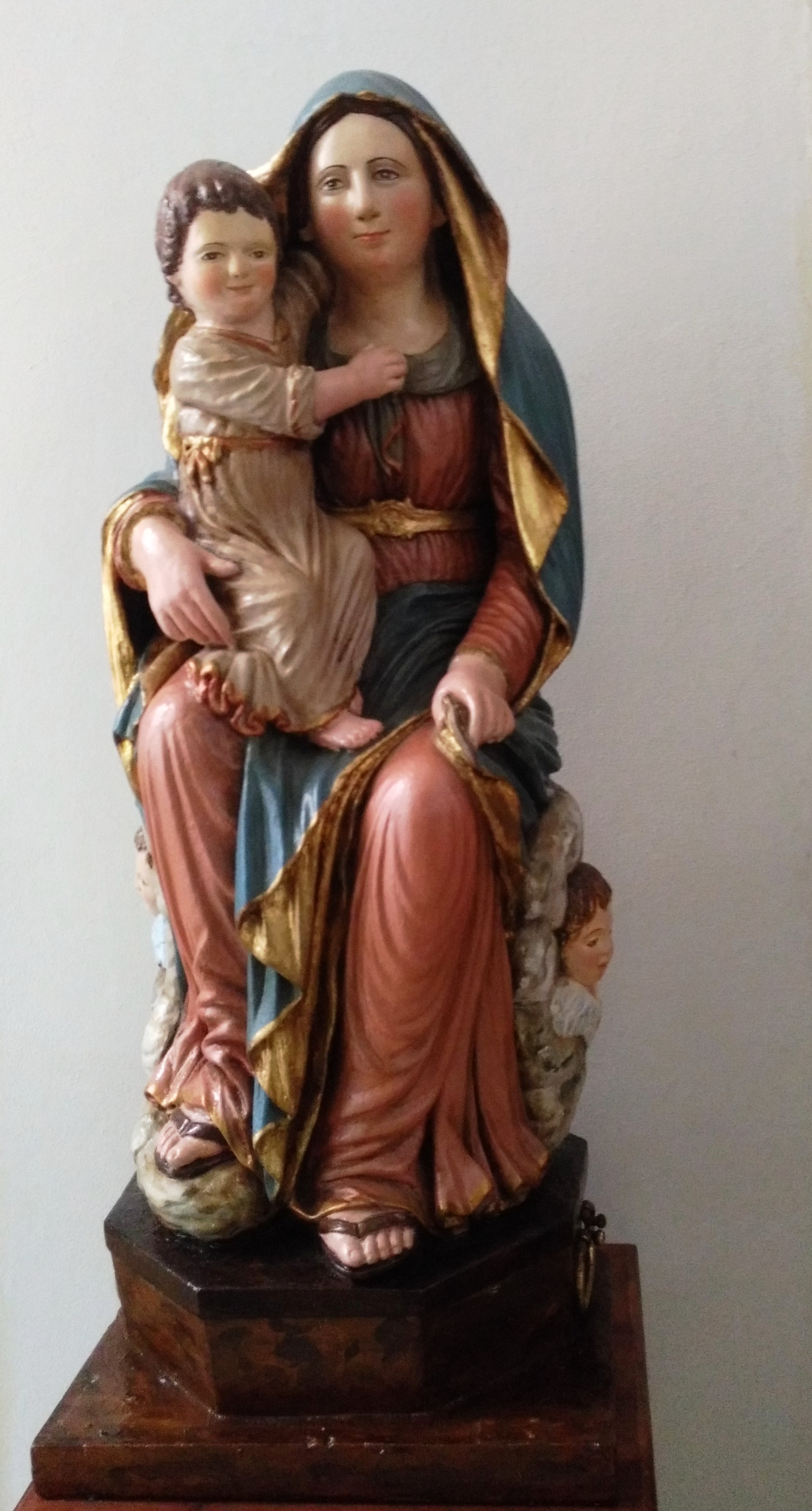
Statue of Madonna del Miele

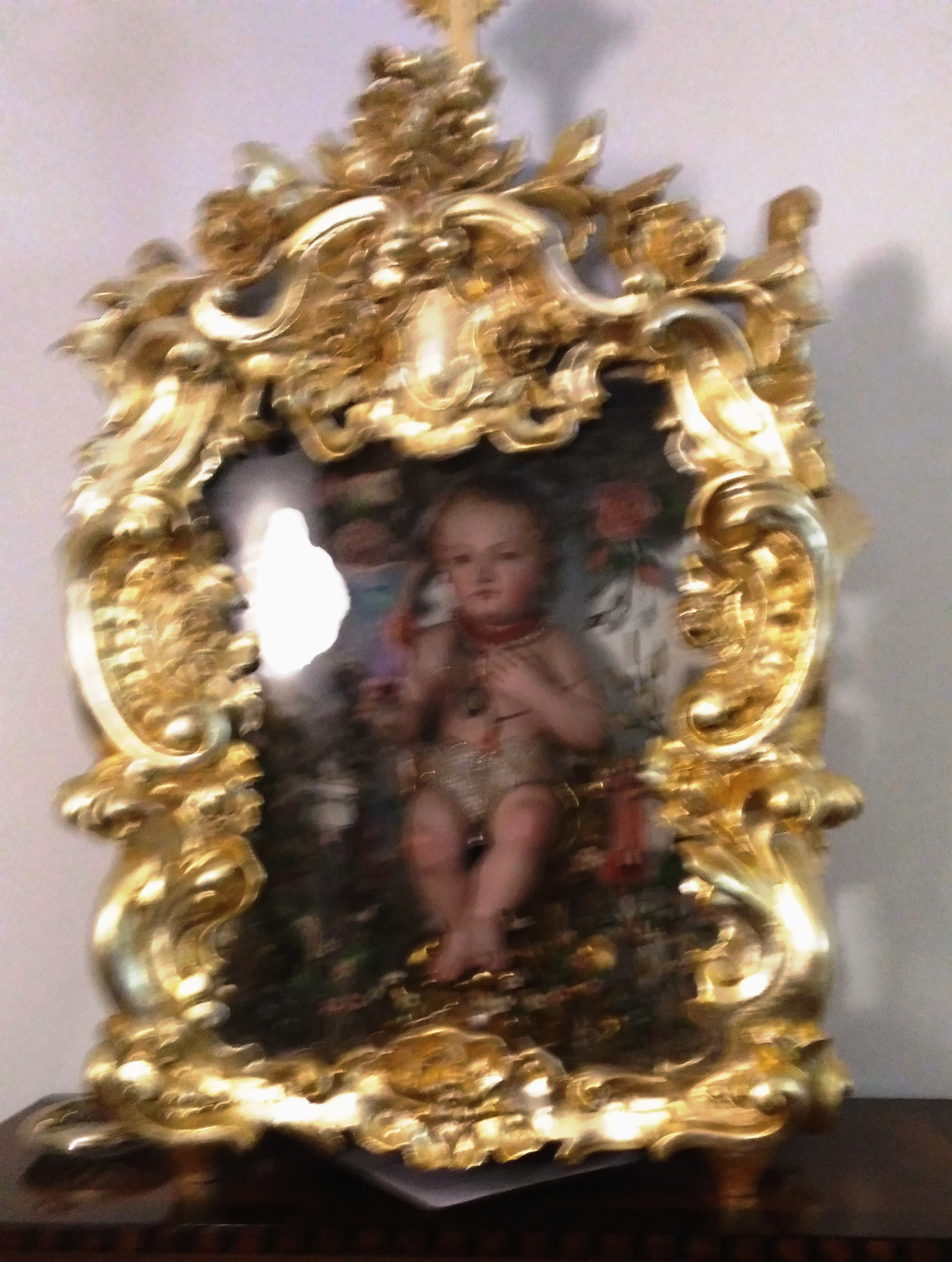
Scaffarrata with the Child Jesus

== See also ==
- Alcamo
