= Town hall, Alcamo =

Town hall of Alcamo, Italy

Palazzo Comunale
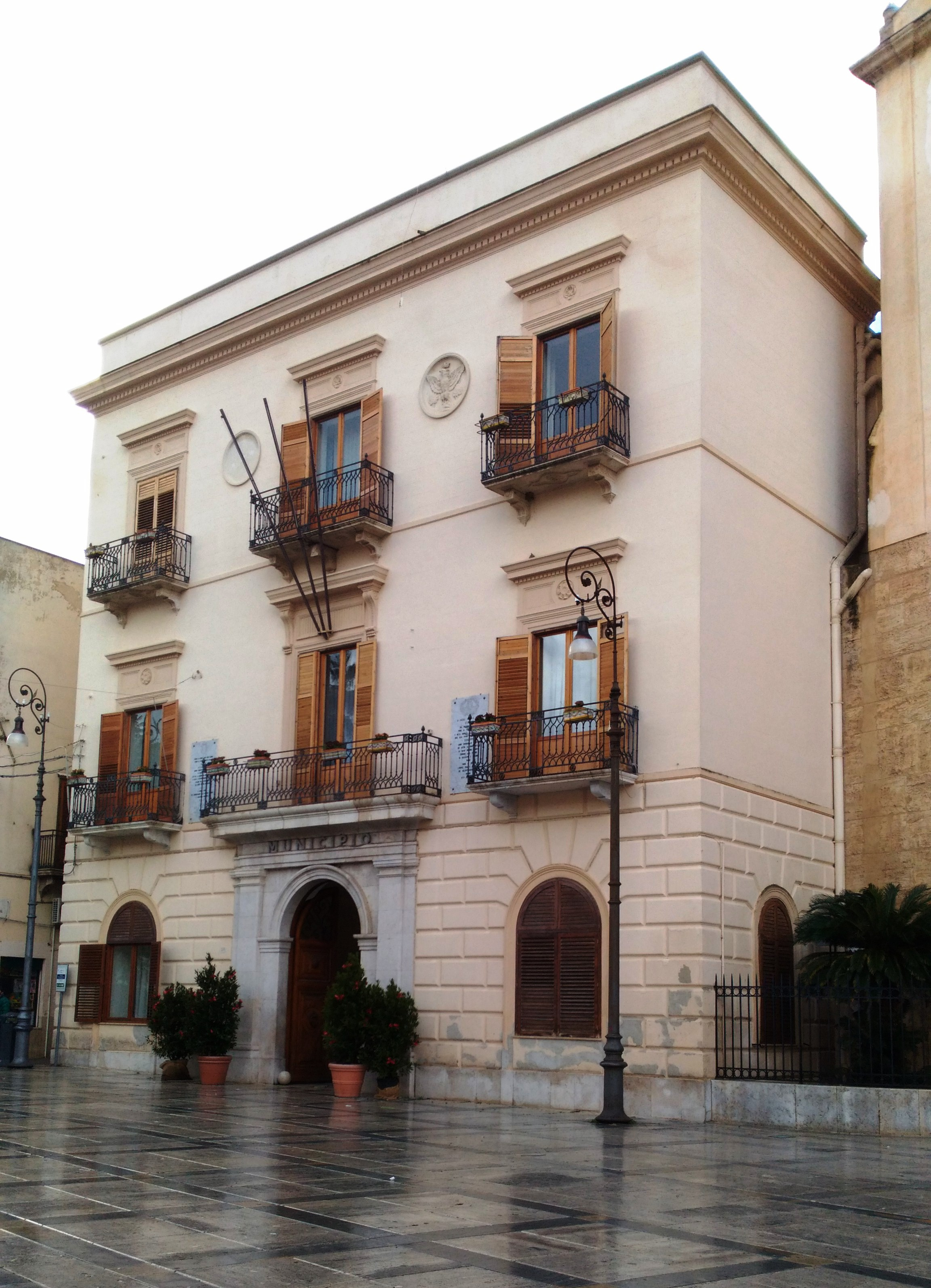
- The façade
- Interactive map of the Palazzo Comunale area

General information
- Architectural style: neoclassical
- Location: Alcamo, Italy
- Coordinates: 37°58′49″N 12°57′53″E
- Construction started: 1843
- Completed: 1865

Design and construction
- Architect: Gaspare Di Giovanni
- Engineer: Francesco Palermo, Greco and Severino

The Town hall of Alcamo (province of Trapani), also called Il Municipio, is a public historical building located in Piazza Ciullo, in the town centre of Alcamo.

== History ==
Owing to the continuous changes of the municipal seat, in 1842 the pro-tempore Lord Mayor, dottor Giovanni Ferrando, bought a warehouse in the main street, in order to build the Town Hall there.

The choice for this place was due to its favourable position. The construction, after the project of the architect Gaspare Di Giovanni, started in 1843; later, the engineer Francesco Palermo, assisted by the engineers Greco and Severino, took over him. The building was completed in 1865 and the following year they settled the municipal offices there; the palace was completely restored in 1984.

== Description ==
The façade is in the neoclassical style: on the ground floor there are two windows with arches and the main front door. On the first and second floor there are three balconies with stone corbels and galleries, dominated by a pediment and a wrought iron parapet. On both sides of the central balcony of the second floor there are two tondos: on the right one there is an eagle, which represents the coat of arms of the town. The façade is completed by the eaves; the entrance has a portal, made with travertine, with two side lesenes; in the entrance hall there is a barrel vault and on the walls there are the engravings of some drawings realized by the painter Gino Patti in 1962: on the right there are some works of the town, such as Church of Saint Thomas, Palazzo De Ballis, the Castle of the Counts of Modica and the Contrast "Rosa fresca aulentissima" by Cielo d'Alcamo, while, on the left, you can see some houses of Alcamo.

To reach the first floor, you have to walk through an entrance with an arch and four marble columns; above the arch there is a plaque with an inscription in memory of the proclamation of the Italian Republic (1946); on the left side another plaque (placed in 1875) commemorates the plebiscites held in 1860 for the annexation to the Kingdom of Italy, and, on the right, a third one in memory of the citizens from Alcamo who died in 1860 during the revolutionary movements (Giuseppe Fazio, Liborio Vallone and Francesco Casarubea).

On the two sides of the main balcony of the first floor, in 1910 (on the 50th anniversary of these movements), they put two plaques in memory of the enterprise carried out by the two brothers Stefano and Giuseppe Triolo barons of Sant'Anna: the one on the left commemorates the rebellion which took place on April 6, and the right one, the heroism of the two Triolo brothers.

== Sources ==
- Roberto Calia: I Palazzi dell'aristocrazia e della borghesia alcamese; Alcamo, Carrubba, 1997
- Carlo Cataldo: Guida storico-artistica dei beni culturali di Alcamo, Calatafimi, Castellammare del Golfo, Salemi e Vita, Sarograf-Alcamo (1982)
- P.M. Rocca: di alcuni antichi edifici di Alcamo; Palermo, tip. Castellana-Di Stefano, 1905 p. 63

== See also ==
- Ex Loggia Comunale
- Giuseppe Triolo
- Gino Patti
