= Santa Maria dello Stellario =

Church building in Alcamo, Italy

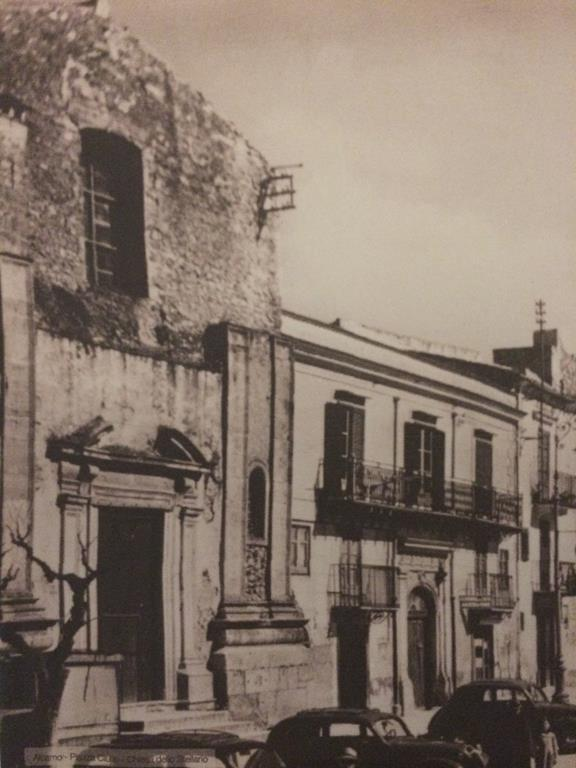
- The façade

Religion
- Affiliation: Capuchin
- Province: province of Trapani
- Region: Sicily
- Rite: Catholic
- Patron: santa Maria dello Stellario
- Year consecrated: 1625

Location
- Location: Alcamo, province of Trapani, Italy
- Municipality: Alcamo
- State: Italy
- Interactive map of Santa Maria dello Stellario
- Territory: Alcamo
- Coordinates: 37°58′49″N 12°57′55″E

Architecture
- Founder: Father Mariano Orofino
- Groundbreaking: 1625

Santa Maria dello Stellario (or Church of Stellario) was a catholic Church located in piazza Ciullo, in the town centre of Alcamo, in the province of Trapani.

== History ==
It was founded in the 17th century by Mariano da Alcamo, a Capuchin friar, and consecrated in 1625. As the historian Ignazio De Blasi affirms in his work, they carried the Holy Sacrament and the painting of Maria Santissima dello Stellario in procession to this Church, to ask her intercession for rain to come. It had not rained for several months: it rained continuously for three consecutive days. The founder also created the homonimous confraternity in the same period. In 1964, before being demolished, the Church was not in bad conditions: in fact, in 1939 Maria De Blasi Casale, a widow, had financed the restoration of its roof.

=== Description ===
The façade had a fine portal; the Church had a single nave, there were Ionic capitals and two altars on both sides. On the high altar, there was a painting of the titular saint, later missing, realized by Giuseppe La Ficara in 1651. The picture, with a low artistic value, represented Mary on a throne of clouds, in the middle of 12 stars and the Infant Jesus in her arms; there were a cardinal and a capuchin friar on the sides, while the Eternal Father and the Holy Ghost were portrayed in the upper part.

In 1769 the Church was embellished with stuccoes; inside it, there were also some ancient crypts which were destroyed during the demolition, made after the building had been sold by the Curia of Trapani. With the income they bought a piece of land in Viale Europa, in order to provide that area with a parish Church, later called chiesa del Sacro Cuore.

=== The confraternity of Santa Maria dello Stellario ===
It was founded on 21 June 1602 in the Mother church and had its oratory inside this Church. From the information that the historian Ignazio De Blasi handed down, we know that its brethren were butchers and farmers. They wore a sack and a visor made with linen cloth, a fabric mantle with the image of Maria Santissima dello Stellario, and a big cordon; they went barefoot, with sandals like capuchin friars, the order which their founder, Father Mariano Bonofino, belonged to. The confraternity dissolved in the forties.

==== Duties of the brethren ====
Here it is the list of their obligations:

- Being always very diligent, in any occasion
- Taking part in the sung Mass and receive Communion on 8 September, festivity of their titular Saint.
- Taking part in the procession of Corpus Domini and on its Octave
- Accompanying dead brethren to their sepulchre and complying with the Easter Precept on Maundy Thursday, in the Church of the Capuchin friars.

== See also ==
- Chiesa del Gesù, Alcamo (Church of Jesus)
- Church of Saint Olivia
- Piazza Ciullo

== Sources ==
- Cataldo, Carlo (1982). Guida storico-artistica dei Beni Culturali di Alcamo-Calatafimi-Castellammare del Golfo-Salemi-Vita. Alcamo: Sarograf.
- Cataldo, Carlo (2001). La conchiglia di S.Giacomo. Alcamo: Campo.
- Bembina, G.B. (1956). Alcamo sacra; con note di P. M. Rocca, rivedute ed accresciute da Francesco Maria Mirabella. Alcamo: Accademia di studi Cielo d'Alcamo.
- Messina, Salvatore (2015). Alcamo nella storia, nella leggenda e nell'arte. Alcamo: Campo.
- "La Chiesa dello Stellario ad Alcamo. Uno scempio impunito".
