= Ex Jesuits' College =

Building in town centre of Alcamo, Italy

Coordinates: 37.9799628°N 12.965153°E

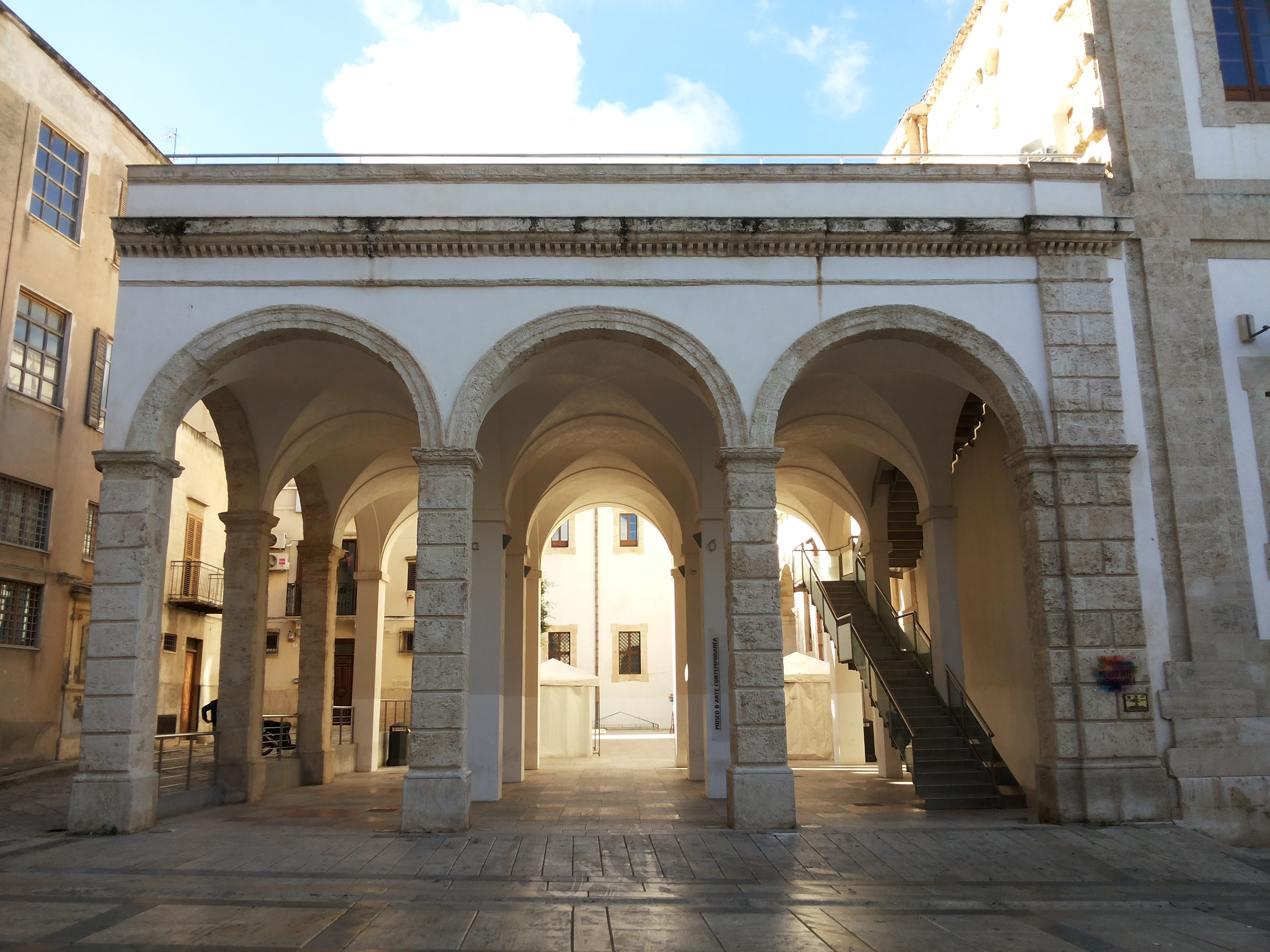
- The Arcade
- Interactive map of the Ex Jesuits' College area

General information
- Location: Alcamo, Italy
- Construction started: 1652

The ex Jesuits' College (in Italian Collegio dei Gesuiti) is a building in the town centre of Alcamo (in the province of Trapani).

== Historical hints ==
Its construction started in 1652, on a project by Dazio Agliata (thanks to the donation by the Jesuit Vincenzo Abbati), in order to promote the diffusion of the Christian faith, but it has never been completed. The building of the colonnade, instead, dates back to the following century.

The only original document about this project was found at the National Library of Paris: in the planimetry there were foreseen four sides with an inner court, the terrace covering the colonnade which was to be built on the ground floor surrounded by the wall of the attic. The project was never completed entirely: in fact, only two sides were realized, the ones facing North and West that have maintained their original characteristics.

In the 18th century the College of Jesuits was enriched with an arcade: they had foreseen another construction above it, but it was not realized. Originally the colonnade of the college had four arches; only three remain now as the one which connected the arcade to the Church of Jesus (in Italian chiesa del Collegio dei Gesuiti), was demolished.

In recent times it has been restored for seven years and today it is the representative house of the town, of the Museum of Contemporary Art of Alcamo and of the Civic Library "Sebastiano Bagolino", which hosts rare incunabula and sixteenth-century editions.

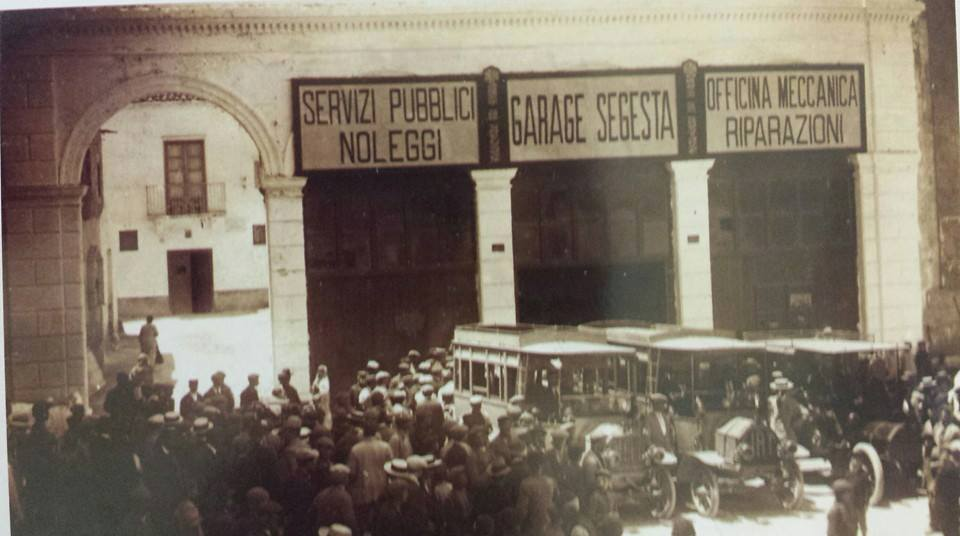
A vintage photo of the arcade, showing the fourth arch which was destroyed later.

== The College ==
The place chosen for the construction of the college, was located on the western side of the town, outside of its walls, very near piazza Maggiore (later piazza Ciullo) in a central area which was already interested by new buildings since the 16th century.

It was required by the ecclesiastical authorities that these colleges were built inside the town centres (so they could rely on a large number of potential students), big enough to lodge the Jesuits and the schools for their pupils, possibly with a garden and preferentially near a church and the Mother Church, but also, at a certain distance from the areas of influence of other religious orders.

Inside the Collegio dei Gesuiti, founded for the diffusion of faith and spiritual formation, also laymen found room, having here a guide for their path of faith.

== Works ==
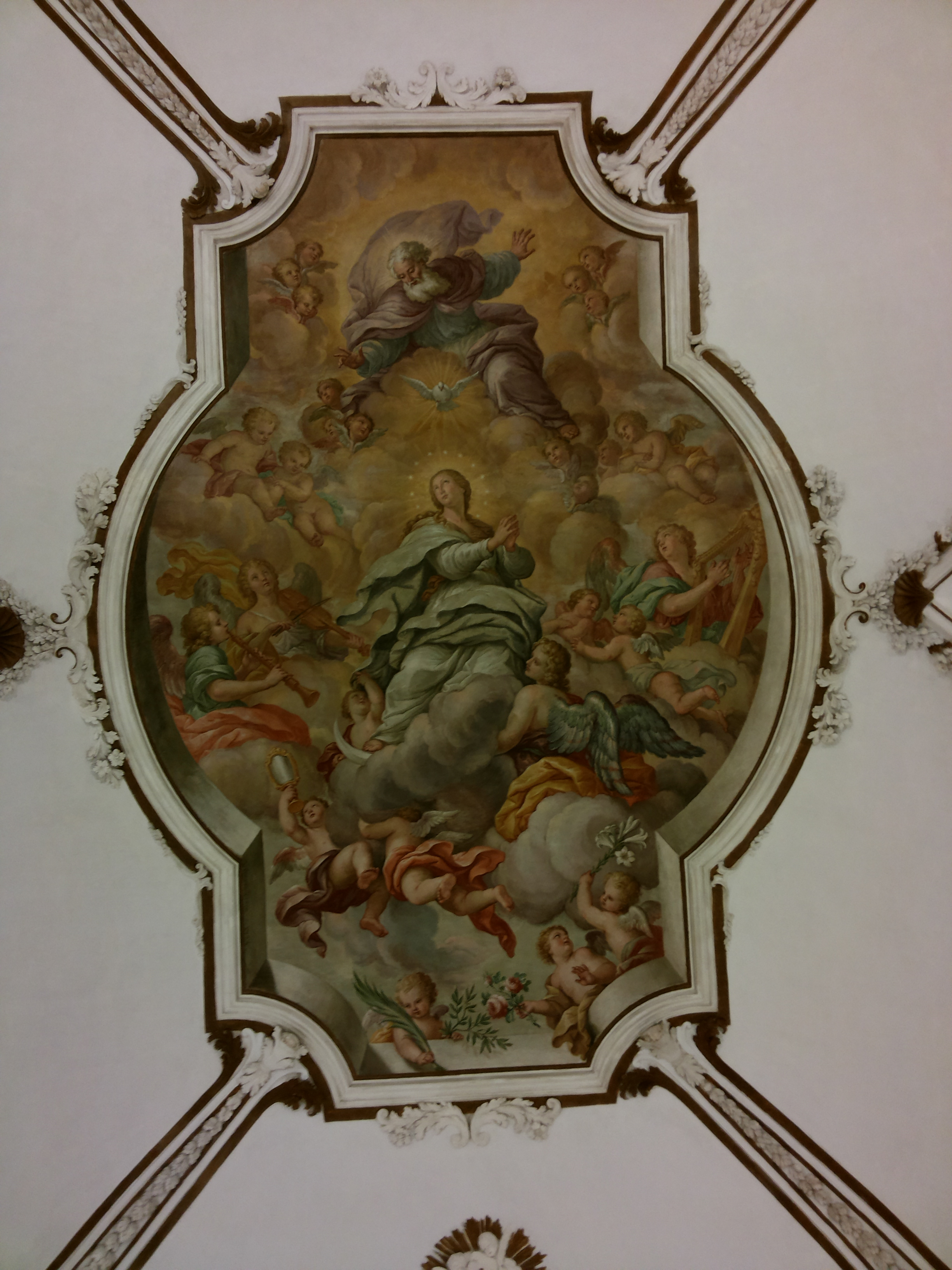
La Gloria dell'Immacolata. Affresco nel soffitto dell'oratorio dell'ex collegio di Domenico la Bruna (1738).

Besides the works exhibited inside the museum, inside the Oratory there are some 18th-century frescoes by Domenico La Bruna: Our Lady's Assumption (on the ceiling), Jesus in the Gethsemane, the Flagellation of Jesus, the encounter with Saint Veronica and others.

== See also ==
- Ex Loggia Comunale
- Piazza Ciullo
- Chiesa del Gesù, Alcamo (Church of Jesus)
- Church of the Holy Family (Alcamo)
- List of Jesuit sites

== Sources ==
- "I Tesori del Centro Storico".
- "itinerari artistici". Archived from the original on 2015-04-03.
- "Alcamo, il collegio dei Gesuiti diventa museo d'arte contemporanea". Archived from the original on 2015-11-19.
- "Lo storico Collegio dei Gesuiti di Alcamo diventa museo". 20 July 2014.
