= Chiesa del Gesù, Alcamo =

Church building in Alcamo, Italy

Chiesa del Gesù
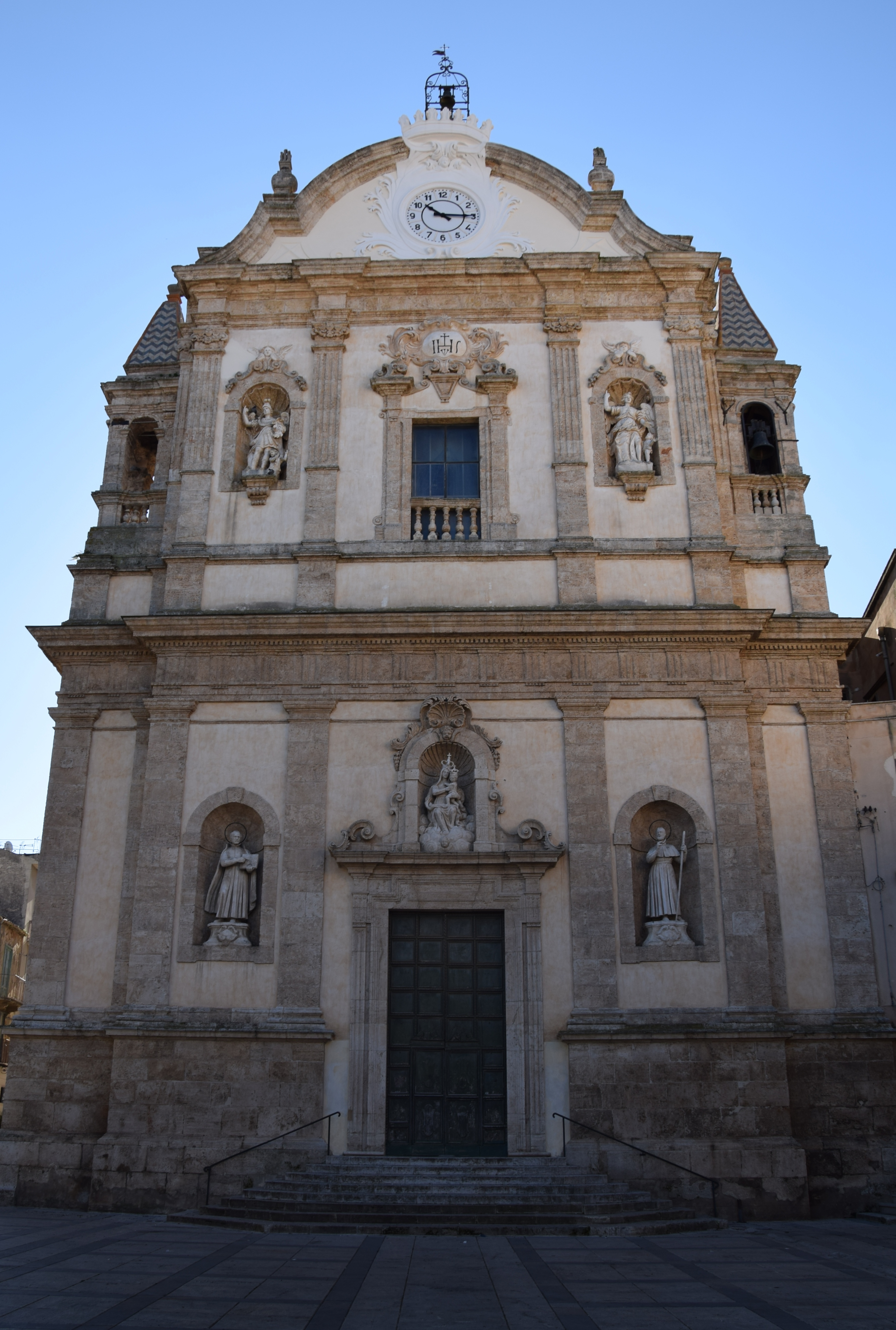
- The façade of the church of Jesus

Religion
- Affiliation: Catholic
- Province: Trapani
- Region: Sicily
- Patron: Jesus

Location
- Location: Alcamo, Trapani, Italy
- State: Italy
- Interactive map of Chiesa del Gesù
- Territory: Alcamo
- Coordinates: 37°58′47″N 12°57′55″E

Architecture
- Founder: Father Vincenzo Abbati
- Groundbreaking: 1684

The Chiesa del Gesù ("Church of Jesus", also called church of the College of Jesuits) is a Catholic church located in Alcamo, in the province of Trapani, Sicily, southern Italy. It is the second largest church in Alcamo, after the basilica di Santa Maria Assunta.

== History ==
The church's construction began in 1684, thanks to the savings made by the Jesuits who built it on a piece of land given by the Town Council; in exchange for it, they undertook to make several building improvements at their own expenses, in particular:

- The addition of six steps to Porta Stella, through which people entered the walled town;
- The fixing of the water piping which took the water of the spring outside the town walls to the fountain used as a drinking trough; they had to move it from piazza Ciullo and place it in the new site next to the main tower of the ditch (corresponding to the present via Mazzini). In this manner they diverted the way that animals crossed to water: it was necessary to do that because after the construction of the Church of Jesus their transit would have been obstructed.

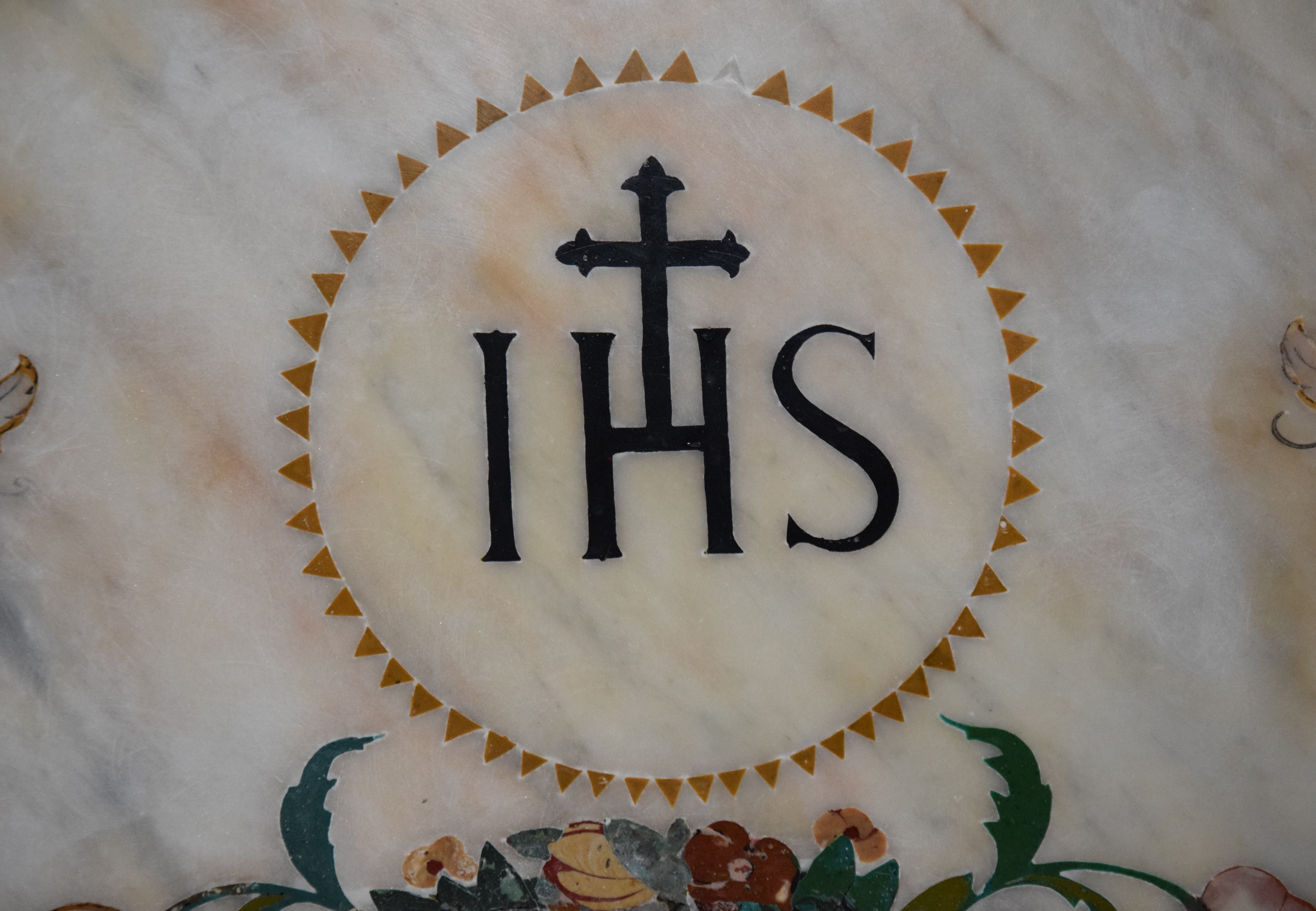
The Jesuits' emblem represented in a marble inlay inside the Church.

On 7 June 1725 Father Vincenzo Monteleone from Alcamo, who was the rector of the Jesuits' College, was appointed as the procurator for the building of this Church which in that period reached only the height of 8 palms on the western side, opposite the town walls.

On 29 July 1764 they inaugurated the Church with a solemn ceremony; later they decorated it with stuccoes and in 1767 completed its construction, which lasted 80 years on the whole, so people called it "the Church of Patching".

In 2014 they made some restoration works on the façade.

In 1748 there was already existing the Congregation of the Maestranza of Rope Makers, probably taking part in the secret Congregation of the Nativity of the Virgin Mary; as their patron, they venerated Christ tied to a column, a wooden statue inside a small chapel which is located next to the secondary church entrance in via Mazzini.

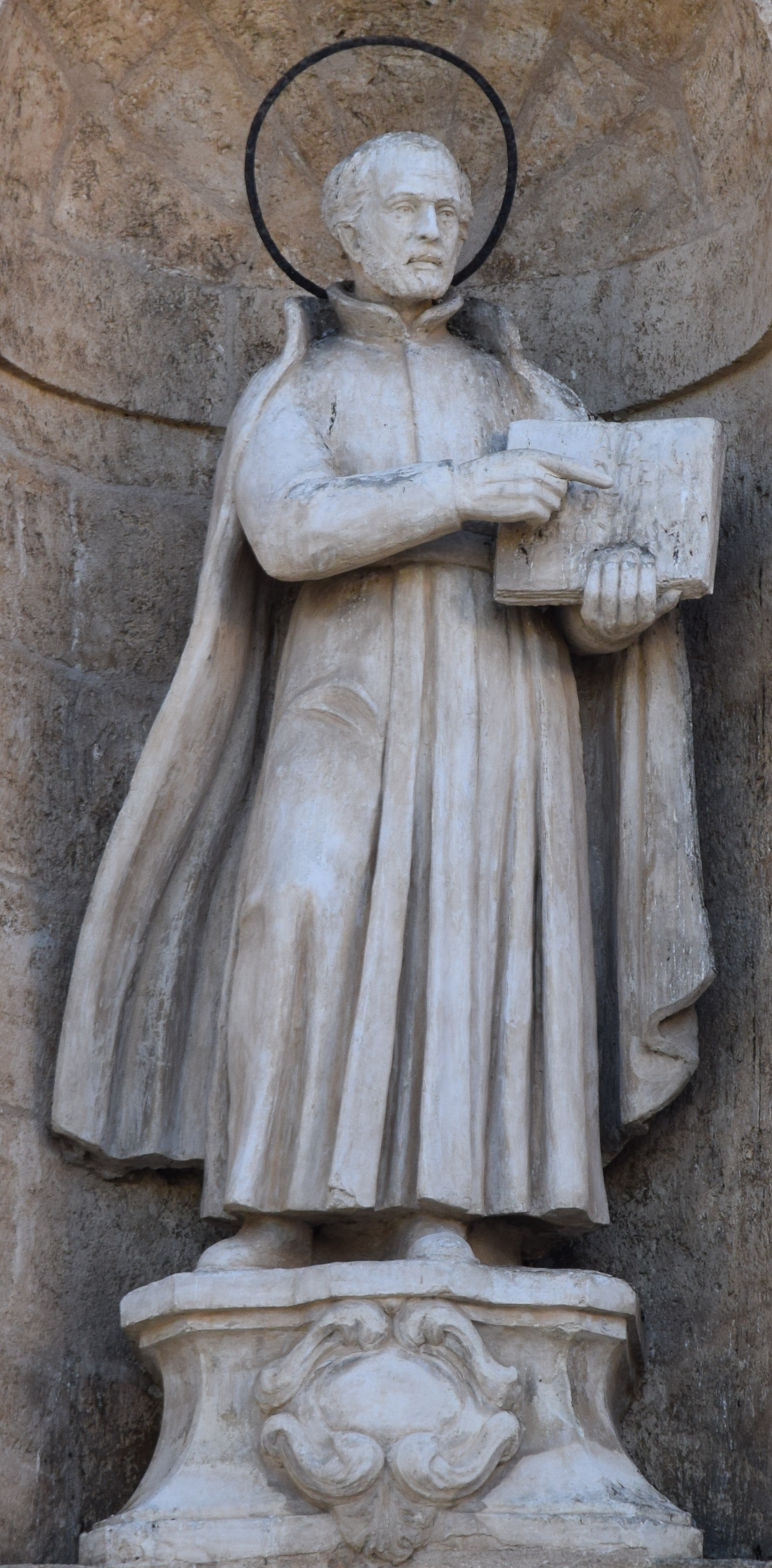
Saint Ignatius of Loyola.

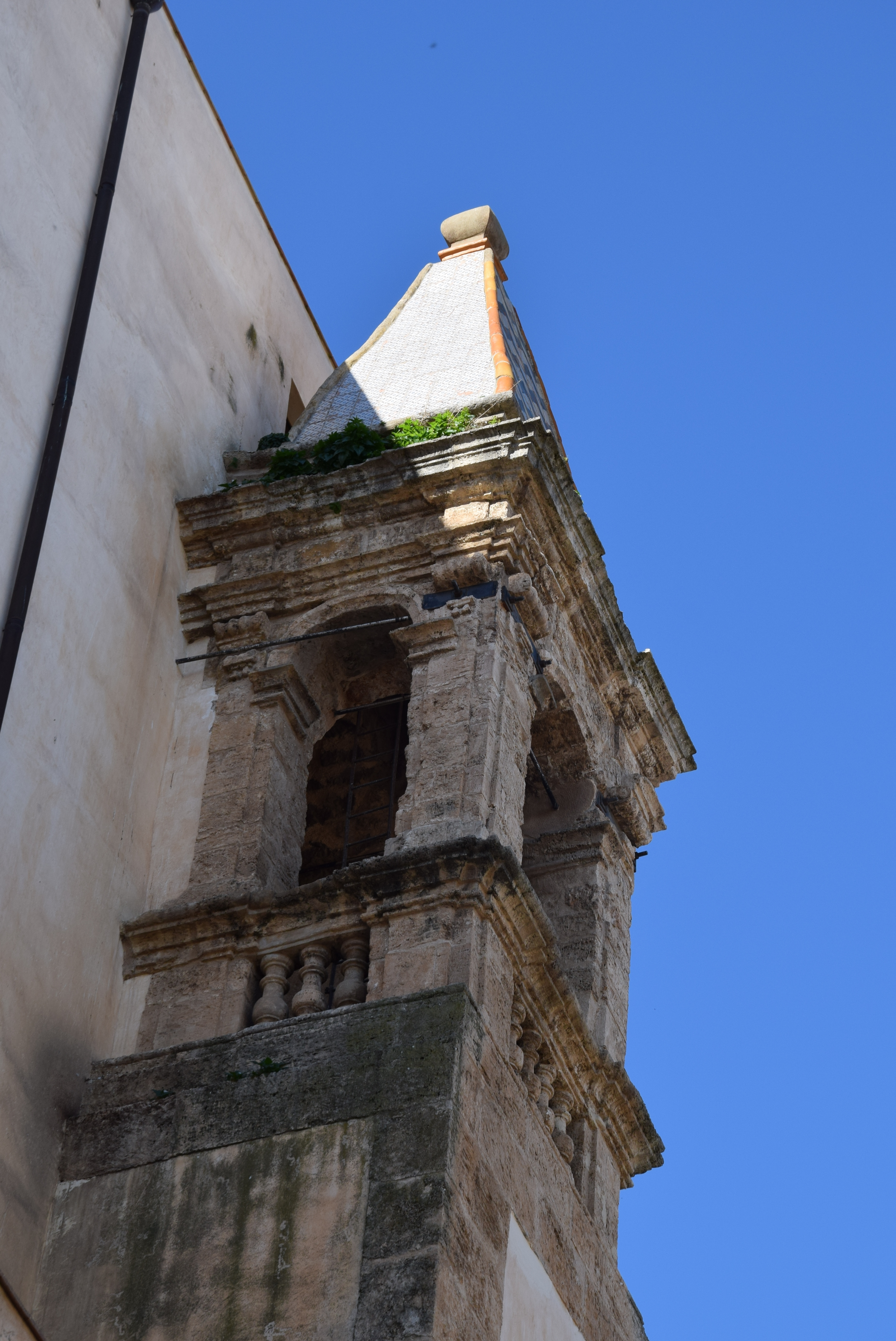
The bell tower on the left of the façade (seen from behind).

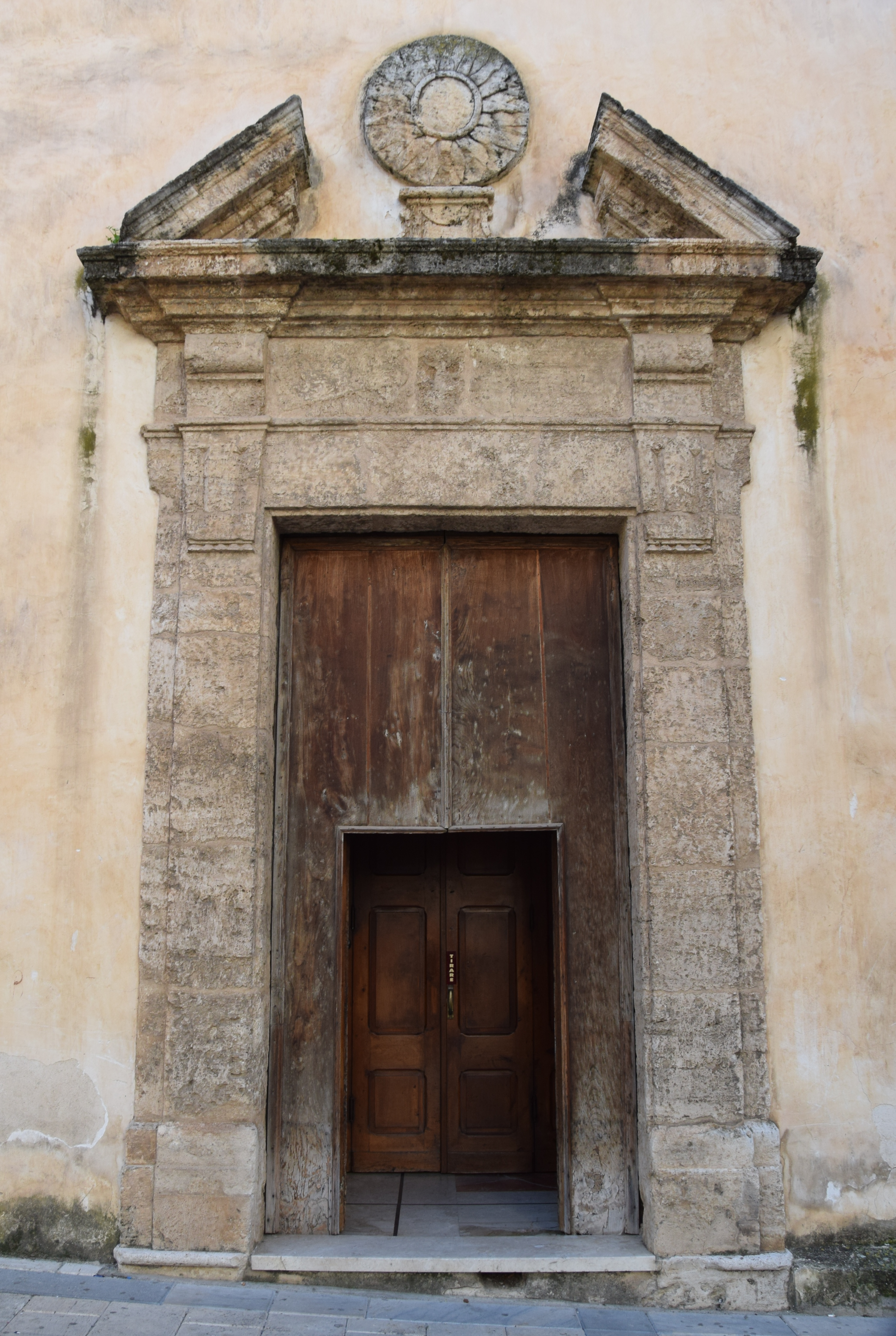
Side portal.

== Description and works ==
The façade of the church is dominating piazza Ciullo: it is in Baroque style and is enriched by square pilasters with Doric-Tuscan and ionic orders. There are five niches on this façade and they contain the statues of saint Ignatius of Loyola, Saint Francis Xavier, Our Lady of Miracles (the patroness saint of Alcamo) and the Archangel Michael and Raphael. In 1931 the three statues which are placed in the lower part were restored (free of charge) by Giuseppe Bambina, a sculptor from Alcamo. It was necessary to restore them because of the damage provoked by Garibaldi's troops that threw stones and shot their guns against them when they entered the town on 17 May 1860.

In 1989 they placed a clock above the central balcony: operated by a remote control, it substituted an older one that decorated the Bell tower of the Mother Church of Alcamo before, while on the sides there are two bell towers surmounted by triangular cusps. Inside one of the belfries there are three bells "Saint Ignatius of Loyola", "Saint Francis Xavier" and "Monstrance Holy Heart of Jesus". On the top of the façade there is a marble crown in memory of the Spanish domination of Sicily.

There are two entrances: the main one is in piazza Ciullo and the side one in via Mazzini. The main entrance has got a stone stairway (called "pietra di li Carrubbazzi" by people).

The church's plan is with one nave overtopped by a barrel vault. The walls and the apse are embellished by stuccoes (cornices and wallpapers) in Rococo style, completed in 1767 (the year in which the Jesuits were expelled from this Church), maybe realized by Giovanni and Francesco Russo, who were Lorenzo Curti's assistants when young.

The present dome was made in 1962; below it there was a headstone with the letters "P X" (missing today) indicating the entrance to the Crypt expanding six meters deep towards the high altar, where they buried the members of the Society of Jesus who had deceased.

On the high altar, there is a painting made in 1797 by Giuseppe Renda, a painter from Alcamo, entitled Jesus' Circumcision (La circoncisione di Gesù). The altar is enlighted by stained glass windows from the top. In the central one, Jesus is represented with his open hands.

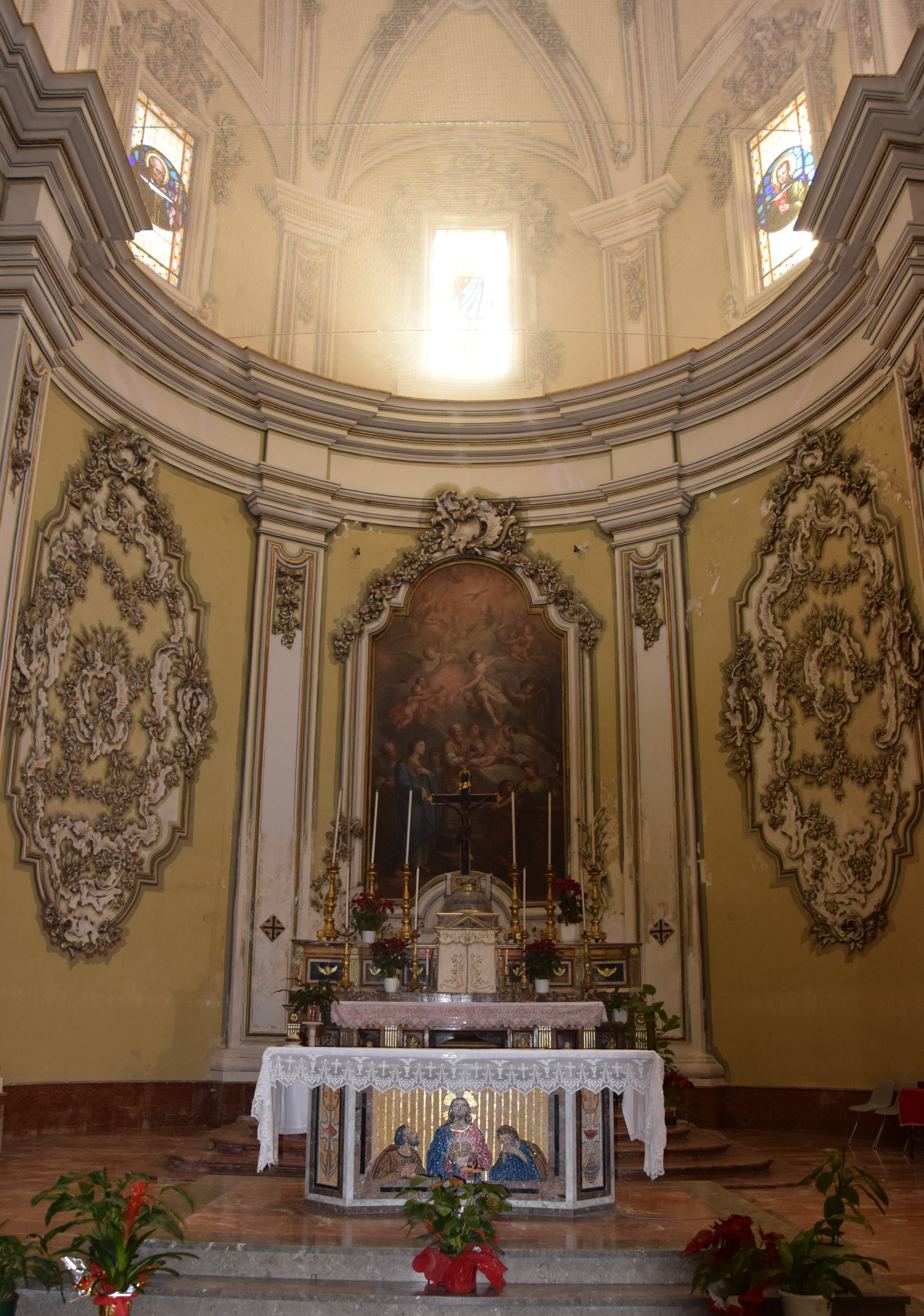
The high altar

Inside the Church there are four chapels, the bigger ones are placed instead of the Transept. There are the following chapels:

- That one on the left side of the high altar is dedicated to saint Ignatius of Loyola, the founder of the Society of Jesus (1534);
- The chapel on the right side of the high altar is dedicated to saint Francis Xavier, co-founder of the Society. In this chapel there is a canvas painting by an unknown author of Pietro Novelli's school: it represents saint Francis Xavier at Gandhia in India, where he converted and baptized about 33,000 people in ten years from 1542 to 1552, he gained the nickname "the apostle of Indies" for this reason
- In the chapel on the left side of the main entrance there is a painting of saint Aloysius Gonzaga; in his honour they founded the congregation of saint Aloysius that met in the oratory of the students, on the ground floor of the College of Jesuits, the present sacristy of the Church of the Holy Family (Alcamo);
- In the chapel on the right side of the main entrance there is a painting of saint Francis Borgia, the third general provost of the order of Jesuits.

Besides, in the Choir there is an altar which was first located in one of the side chapels (very presumably the chapel of the Holy Heart of Jesus or that dedicated to the Immaculate Conception). This altar is surmounted by a wooden bust of Saint Ignatius of Loyola.

At the side entrance from via Mazzini there is a holy water stoup dated 1500 made with white alabaster, probably coming from the church of the Annunciation. On its molded shaft there are the carvings of some motifs with acanthus leaves and the image of Annunziata. The circular font basin is decorated with Festoons and contained four heads of angels: today there is only one existing.

== The sepulchral monument of Father Vincenzo Abbati ==
Next to the main entrance of the Church there is a marble monument: it is in Baroque style and realized by unknown artists at about 1764. It is 383 centimetres high and 198 large.

Inside it, there are the mortal remains of father Vincenzo Abbati (deceased in 1654); thanks to him they built the Jesuits' College, the church of the Holy Family and the convent of the church of Santa Maria dell'Itria.

The monument is embellished by marble inlays representing vegetable compositions and is surmounted by the emblem of the Jesuits' order with the monogram IHS above a tympanum aedicule.

In the middle of the monument, inside a niche of elliptical shape, they inserted the bust of Father Vincenzo Abbati. On the bust's sides there are two allegorical marble female figures, one is holding a cornucopia and the other a pyra.

Below Abbati's bust, there is the family Abbati's emblem, represented by three stars set in correspondence of the vertexes of an overturned triangle with an eccentric feline's claw on a grey background.

Below you can see a marble inlay with a commemorative Latin epigraph. In the pseudo-pilaster strips above the sides of the epigraph they painted two skulls, with some ornamental motifs representing seashells and volutes in the middle.

== See also ==
- Ex collegio dei Gesuiti
- List of Jesuit sites

== Sources ==
- Giovan Battista Maria Bembina, Francesco Maria Mirabella, Pietro Maria Rocca, Alcamo sacra, Alcamo, Tipografia Cartografica, 1956.
- Facciponte, G. (1995). I gesuiti in Alcamo: dalle origini al secolo XVIII (1650–1767) (in Italian). Carrubba.
- Carlo Cataldo, La conchiglia di S.Giacomo p. 136, Alcamo, ed. Campo, 2001
