= Sacra Famiglia, Alcamo =

Church building in Alcamo, Italy

Sacra Famiglia Holy Family
- Chiesa della Sacra Famiglia (Italian)
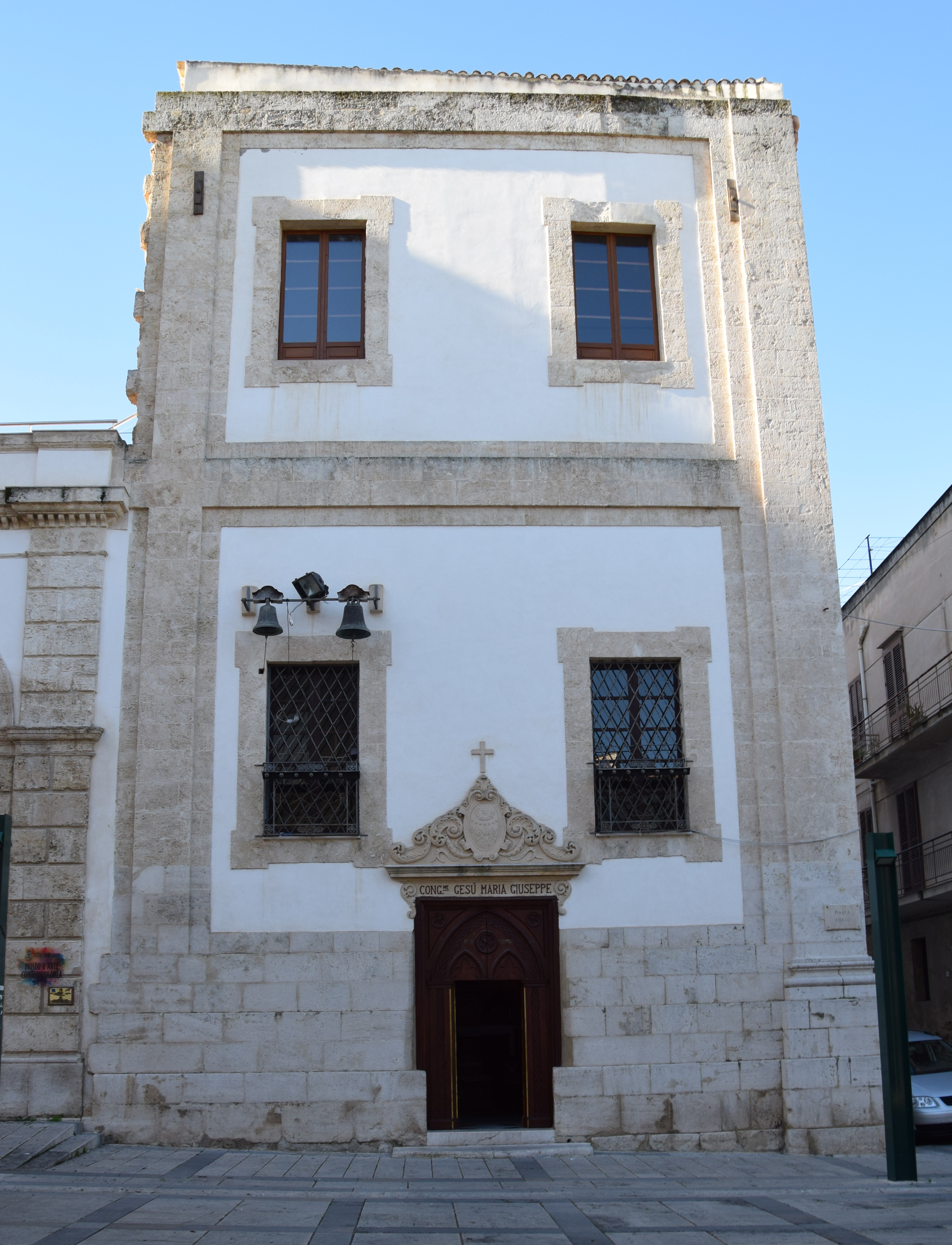
- The façade of the church of the Holy Family

Religion
- Affiliation: Catholic
- Province: province of Trapani
- Region: Sicily
- Patron: dedicated to the Holy Family

Location
- Location: Alcamo, province of Trapani, Italy
- State: Italy
- Interactive map of Sacra Famiglia; Holy Family
- Territory: Alcamo
- Coordinates: 37.97997°N 12.96505°E

Architecture
- Founder: Father Vincenzo Abbati
- Groundbreaking: 17th century

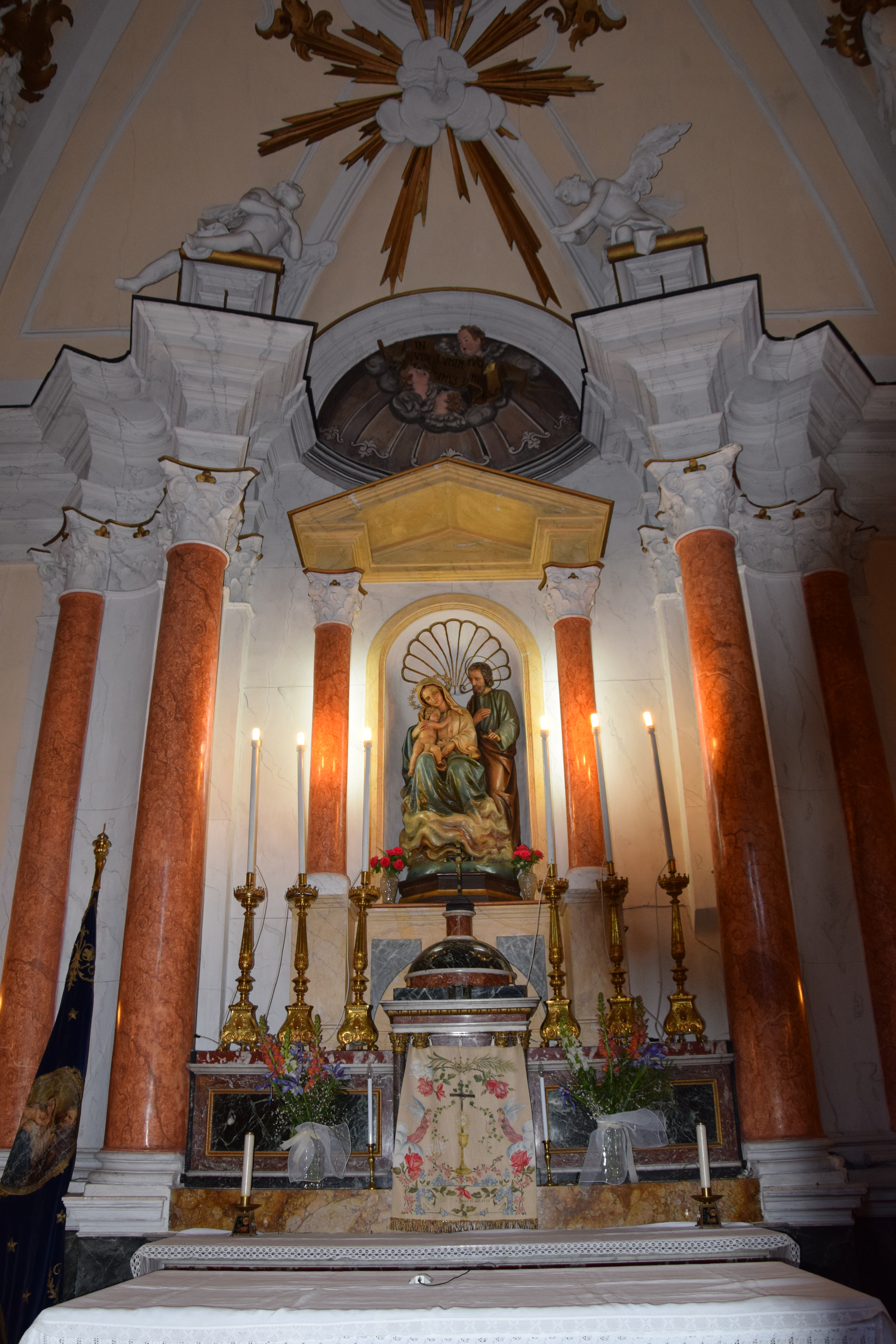
The high altar.

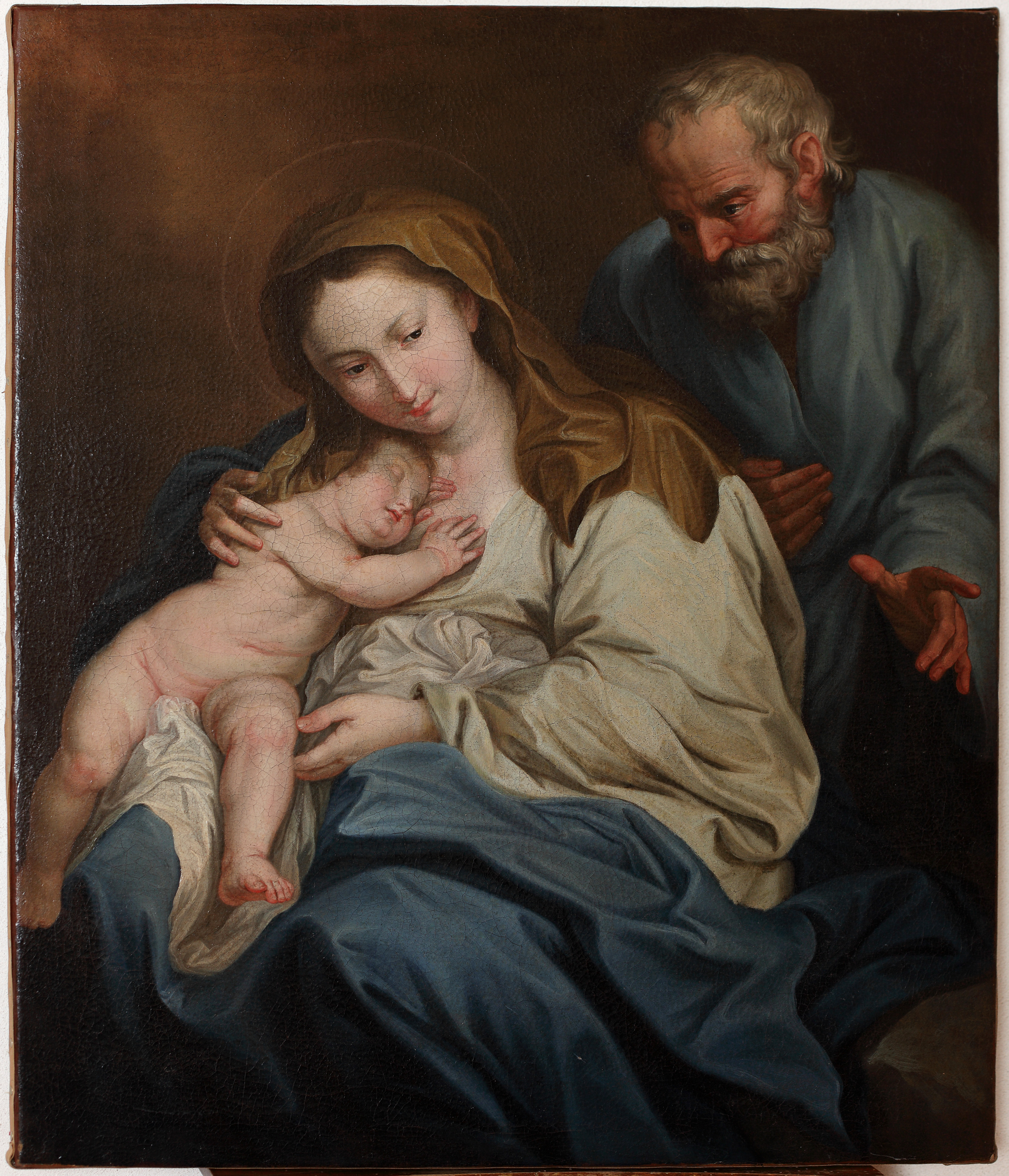
The canvas painting of the Holy Family (kept in the sacristy).

Sacra Famiglia ("Holy Family", called also chiesa di San Giuseppe or Mezzana or Culliggeddu because of its small dimensions) is a religious building in Alcamo, Sicily, southern Italy; it is located on the ground floor of the Ex Jesuits' College.

== History ==
The church was built thanks to Father Vincenzo Abbati, who died in 1654. After his death, his body was first buried in the church of Stellario and later was moved inside the church of Jesus, after its completion.

In this church, on 25 April 1745, the male Congregation of Madonna del Lume (named after middle-class people, that is "little land owners"), was formed. According to the chronicles of the time, the members met every Sunday evening, and the congregation was abolished on 28 July 1770 by a royal decree.

The church was run by the Society of Jesus until their expulsion in 1860. Later (more precisely since 1866) the administration of the church passed to the Congregation of the Holy Family, which had been founded inside the Ex Jesuits' College on 15 November 1824 by Father Domenico Maria Lo Jacono, who was its director and catechist. Probably, after the Jesuits' expulsion, the congregation of Madonna del Lume moved into the church of Santa Maria del Soccorso.

In 1901 they founded the female congregation of Madonna del Lume (Madonna of Light), that moved into a chapel inside the chiesa madre in 1942. On the altar there is a painting dedicated to Madonna del Lume painted by Giuseppe Renda. In Alcamo the feast of Madonna del Lume was celebrated on the fifth Sunday after each Easter; two weeks after the festivity of Patrocinio.

In 1947 monsignor Giuseppe Barone was appointed as its Rector and under his leadership the church was modernized.

The Church was closed in 1968, owing to the damages suffered during 1968 Belice earthquake; it was later restored and cleaned, thanks to the financing by Nicolò Cassarà, before being fully reopened.

== Description and works ==
The church has a single navy with three altars: the high altar (in white marble and adorned by red stucco columns) and two side altars, in polychromatic marble, realized and inaugurated in 1937.

- Until 1952 on the high altar there was a painting made by Giuseppe Renda (1772–1805) from Alcamo, now kept in the sacristy and in the same year substituted by a wooden statue of the Holy Family, realized by the firm Luigi Santifaller from Ortisei (Bolzano) and donated by Nicolò Cassarà from Alcamo. For this reason they transformed the wall, by building an oval niche, where they placed it, embellishing it with two small columns in red stucco, similar to the existing ones. Under the high altar, inside a marble urn there are the relics of Saint Benedict the Moor, Saint Paulinus of Nola, and Saint Casimir.
- On the left altar there is a Holy Crucifix (which was kept in the attic of the Ex Jesuits' College according to tradition), made by an unknown author and restored in 1901.
- On the right altar you can see the painting of Madonna del Lume, by an unknown author and placed on the altar in 1740, that they restored in 1901 too. In a picture dated 1969 we can notice Our Lady and her Infant Child's silver crowns attached to the painting and other silver ornaments: two ear-rings, a small necklace and a pin.

On the right side of the high altar there is the "Passion's chapel" (built with the will of the congregation of the Holy Crucifix), where there are the statues of Jesus praying in the Garden of Gethsemane, Our Lady of Sorrows, Jesus scourged and tied to a column and Jesus dead in the inferior level. These statues come from a group which were kept in the Ex Chiesa di Santa Maria dello Stellario. Next to them you can see a painting of Saint Michael (archangel), who Father Pugliese lighted candles to, in order to keep the rain away during the feast of Patrocinio, taking place on the third Sunday after Easter, when they offered lunch to poor families in piazza Ciullo.

On the side walls there are four oval paintings made by Gioacchino Speciale (1923–2004), from Partinico, realized in 1955 in substitution of the others which were in a bad state:

- The Presentation of Jesus at the Temple
- The Annunciation
- The Virgin's wedding
- The escape to Egypt.

On the ceiling there is the Ascension of Mary and of his son Jesus (by an unknown author). In 1926 they made the wooden pulpit decorated with carvings representing the joiner's tools (tongs, a hammer and a saw) on both sides and Saint Joseph's emblem (that is the sun, stars and ears of wheat seen by Joseph the Just) on the fronton: everything is surmounted by a wooden canopy which matches the style.

In the same year this pulpit won a prize in an exhibition at Montecatini Terme. You could enter it through an external wooden small staircase, that was substituted with a more comfortable one, made in masonry, set into the wall and hidden by a small door. At the corners of the pulpit there are two little columns adorned with Corinthian capitals which surmount two angels’ heads; behind them, on the wall, there is, as a decorative motif, a great stucco in the shape of a snail.

The choir, which you can reach through a small staircase set into the wall, has got a harmonium and is embellished by a wooden parapet. In 1954 under the choir, in order to increase the Church's luminosity, they placed a new wooden inner door with large glasses in four parts, that is formed by two sides small doors and two central ones, with the sign of a cross in the middle (inscribed in the middle of a circle) and made by Vito Fulco. On this occasion they also restored the choir, letting it lean on cement columns with a marble base. During these works they have also changed the first electric installation (dating back to 1912) and placed two small holy water stoups, made in red marble. Outside one of the two windows of the choir there are two bells.

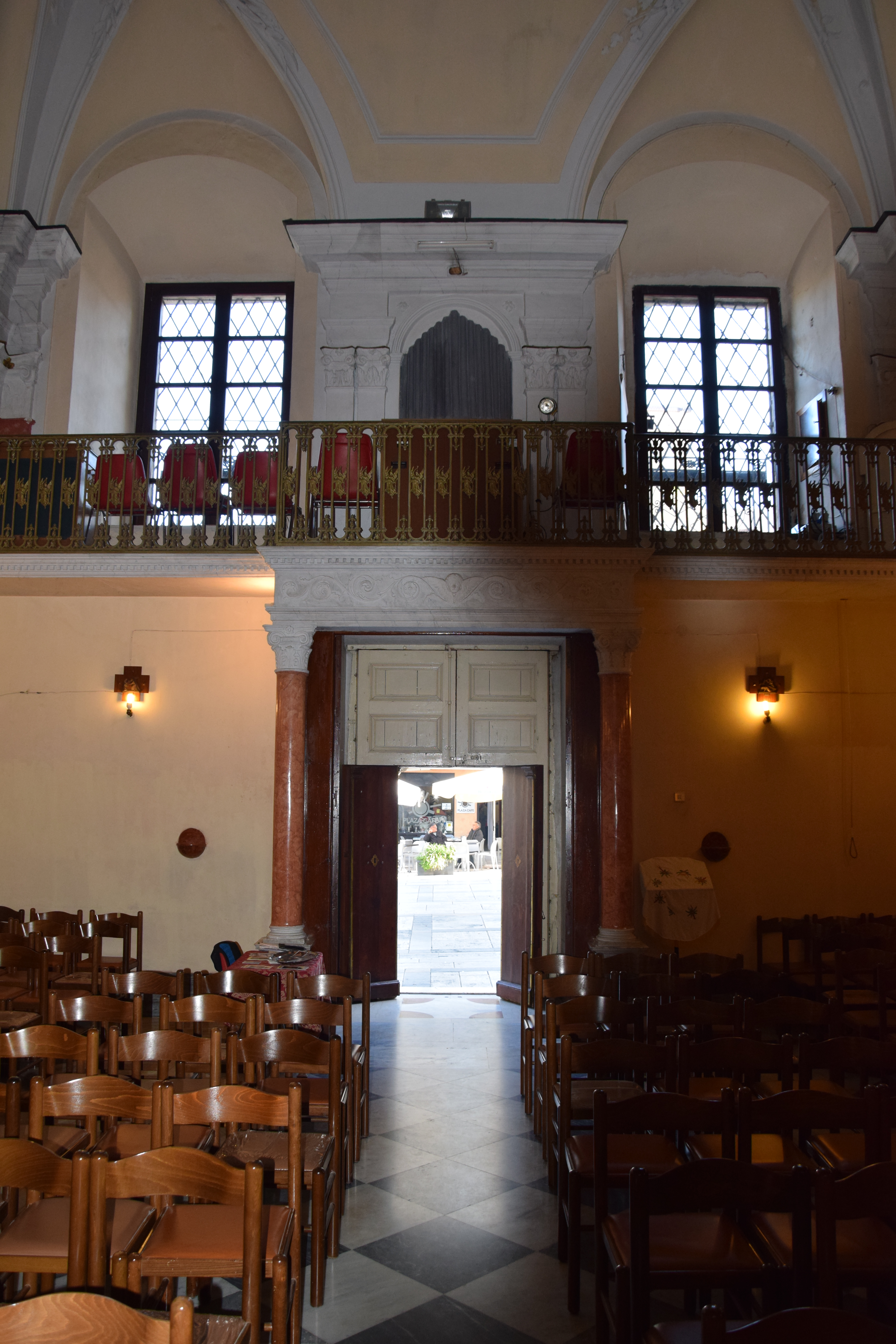
The choir and the inner door.

The church Confessional has got two kneeling-stools and is placed in a niche set into a side wall of the Church. The vestments, altar cloths and sacred furnishings, realized thanks to the charity of Francesco Guarrasi Anna are:

- The white, red and violet altar hangings worked with gold;
- The large armchair of golden stucco and red velvet, with four stools and a platform;
- The silver altar cards with the Church official badge for the high altar;
- a thurible;
- a silver incense-boat;
- a Gothic style ciborium;
- a triangular processional standard made in velvet with a gold fringe;
- a silver tray;
- a holy water stoup with an aspergillum.

Besides, the external door in Gothic style and the steps, made by the master builder Geraci, were realized thanks to the benefactor Guarrasi Anna.

== The feast of Patrocinio ==
Every year the congregation of the Holy Family organizes the feast of Patrocinio, which takes place in piazza Ciullo. During the feast they place a stage in front of the Church of Jesus (chiesa del Gesù) where some poor people representing the Holy Family sit for the lunch offered and served by the members of this congregation.

== See also ==
- Catholic Church in Italy
- Ex Jesuits' College
- List of Jesuit sites
- Piazza Ciullo

== Sources ==
- Cataldo, Carlo (2001). La conchiglia di S. Giacomo. Alcamo: Edizioni Campo.
- Barone, Giuseppe (1969). La Congregazione di Gesù Maria e Giuseppe nella chiesa della Sacra Famiglia di Alcamo. Alcamo: Accademia di studi Cielo d'Alcamo.
