= Mariano da Alcamo =

Italian catholic presbyter

Mariano da Alcamo (1555? – 27 July 1621) was an Italian Catholic presbyter.

== Biography ==
He was born in Alcamo in the (province of Trapani), between 1555 and 1560, as his parents (Niccolò Bonafino from Savoca (in the province of Messina), and Caterina Russo, had married in 1554.

He started his religious life with the Capuchines in the province of Palermo, and after he became a priest, he went on studying to become a preacher but in 1591 he was chosen as the provincial Father. At the end of his office he asked to leave for the missions and so in 1599 he left with Lawrence of Brindisi for Bohemia and Persia where Protestant doctrines were very widespread, in order to preach the Gospel of Jesus Christ and defeat heresies.

There are few anecdotes proving his reputation for holiness which spread at his coming back to Sicily, while from his Latin letters sent to his friend and schoolmate Sebastiano Bagolino, we learn that the mission was successfully proceeding, thanks to the collaboration given by the emperor Rudolf II, Holy Roman Emperor, and that he was completing a collection of sermons with the title In orationem Dominicam seu Mare oceanum concionatorum pauperum.

In Sicily Mariano worked for the diffusion of the devotion to the Virgin Mary. This veneration for the Virgin Mary was reinforced by his certainty that he had got some graces (he thought he had been released from temptations and dangers), and by the vision of Our Lady of Stellario which he said he had once had in the friary of Alcamo after his return from Bohemia.

After this vision there were other events believed supernatural, among which was his prediction of the healing of a noblewoman from Alcamo and her daughter’s death, provoked by the same disease.

In 1608, after he settled in the Capuchin province of Palermo, he had a certain reputation for holiness: for some months he daily preached in Palermo cathedral and then he went to Trapani, where there was the viceroy marquess Juan Fernández Pacheco de Vigliena, who he was asked to pray for, and to preach for another period of time in Sanctuary of Maria Santissima Annunziata of Trapani.

When the provincial Father Gianmaria from Castelvetrano died, in 1611, he was nominated provincial vicar and then qualificator of the Congregation for the Doctrine of the Faith, guardian of the friaries of Trapani (1614) and Marsala (1615). He died in Palermo on 27 July 1621.

== Works ==
The most important part of his works is in his manuscripts:

- In orationem Dominicam, quae mare oceanum Concionarum Pauperum nuncupatur, Tom.3, in folio. A collection of sermons
- Elucidatio in primam partem Divi Thomae, completed in 1612
- Quaresimale, after his death it was missing between the friaries of Genoa and Palermo and later lost together with his portrait and a picture of ‘’Our Lady with Stellario’’ that had been painted by him.

In order to promote the devotion for Our Lady with Stellario he published a series of devotional books (prose and poetic works)

- Modus contemplandi coronam beatissimae Virginis Mariae (Palermo 1608), tradotto in italiano dal sacerdote Michele Caruso.
- Poemata varia et devotissima in laudem beatissimae Virginis Mariae (1613)
- Plures palmulae in folio et alia diversa opuscula carmine et prosa (both edited in Palermo nel 1612)
- Officium parvum stellari gaudiosi, dolorosi et gloriosi beatissimae Virginis Mariae (1615)
- Labyrinthus beatissimae Virginis Mariae (1615).

== See also ==
- Order of Friars Minor Capuchin
- Missionaries
- Lorenzo da Brindisi
- Institute of consecrated life
- Mendicant orders

== Sources ==
- Busolini Dario: Dizionario Biografico degli Italiani volume 70; editore Treccani, 2008
- Mazzuchelli G.: Gli scrittori d’Italia pp. 352 s.; città=Brescia, I edizione, 1753
- da Cesinale Rocco: Storia delle missioni dei cappuccini pp. 635 s.; tip.Barbera, Roma, II ed.,1872
- F. M. Mirabella: Cenni degli alcamesi rinomati in scienze, lettere, arti, armi e santità; tip.Surdi & C.|, Alcamo
- Mirabella F.M.: Una lettera del p. M. Bonofino da A.; ediz.IX,1884
- Tommaso Papa: Memorie storiche del clero di Alcamo; ediz.Accademia di studi Cielo d'Alcamo, Alcamo, 1968
- Nicotra F.: Diz. illustrato dei Comuni siciliani; Società editrice del Dizionario illustrato dei Comunisiciliani pp. 198; Palermo, I ediz., 1907-1908
- da Castellammare Antonino: Storia dei minori cappuccini della provincia di Palermo pp. 343–353; Palermo, II ediz., 1922
- Egidio da Modica F.: Catalogo degli scrittori cappuccini della provincia di Palermo pp. 107–109; Palermo, 1930
- von Oberleutasch C. Die Kapuziner in Österreich zum 350jährigen Bestand der Wiener Kapuzinerprovinz (1600-1650) p. 264; ed. Lexicon Capuccinum, Roma, 1951
- a Pobladura Melchior De cooperatoribus in compositione annalium Ordinis fratrum minorum Capuccinorum pp. 22, 41; ediz. in Collectanea Franciscana, XXVI, 1956
- Papa T.: Memorie storiche del clero di Alcamo pp. 57, 64 s.; Alcamo, 1968
- Kusin E.: Die Anfänge des Kapuzinerordens in Erzherzogtume Österreich unter und ob der Enns (1600-1630)3-4, p. 249; ed. in Collectanea Franciscana, XXXIX, 1969
