= Ex Loggia Comunale =

Building in Alcamo, Trapani

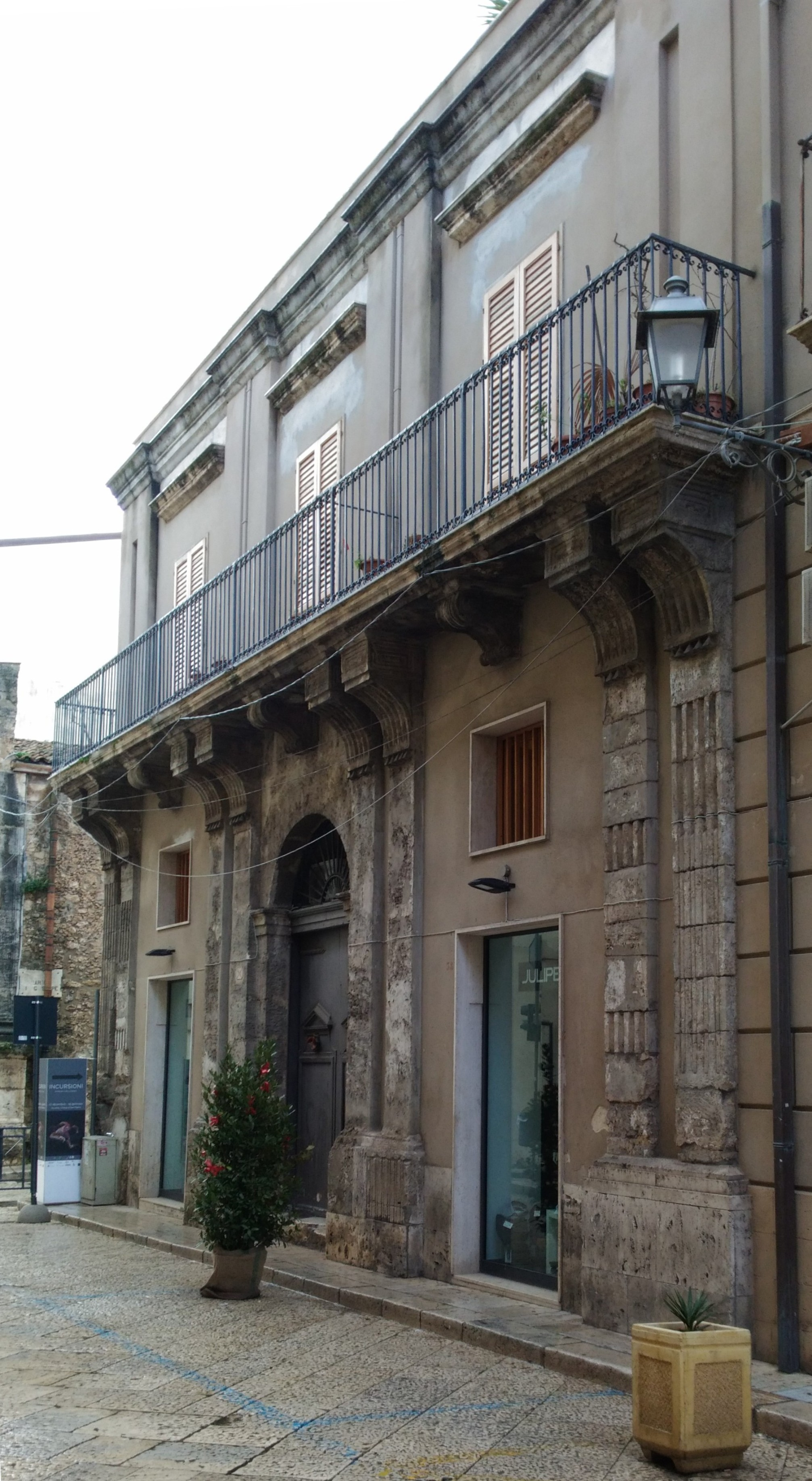
- the façade
- Interactive map of the Ex Loggia Comunale area

General information
- Location: Alcamo, Italy
- Coordinates: 37°58′51″N 12°58′00″E
- Construction started: 1525

Design and construction
- Architect: Domenico Vitale

The building of the ex Loggia Comunale is located in Alcamo, in the province of Trapani.

== History ==
The citizens of Alcamo called ‘’loggia’’ the Town Hall; this custom was common in many Sicilian towns, and is also proved by several notary deeds.

Inside the Loggia, the town administrators held their meetings; the building is often mentioned in some documents dating back to 1525. It was rebuilt in 1548, according to the design of the architect Domenico Vitale, in the same place where the old one stood.

Thanks to the suppression of the religious order by the order of the king Ferdinand III of Sicily, in 1767 the Giurati moved into the Ex Jesuits’ College, so making use of more functional and large premises. As a result, the loggia was completely abandoned and, in 1783 it was put on sale in order to devote the proceeds for the works of the new seat.

In 1806, owing to the Jesuits’ return to Alcamo, the municipal authorities gave back the premises of the College and their seat was moved into Palazzo Palmerini located near the Mother church, the first year for rent and later by census, according to the deed dated 3 June 1807 by the notary Vincenzo Coppola. Nobody knows how long this palace was the municipality’s seat.

The floor built in 1558 had already fallen down in the second half of the 18th century and part of the decorations were used in the new construction which was started in 1813. In the 20th century the owners of the lodge became the Tobia family and their heirs; in 1976 a part of the building, sold to a building contractor, was rebuilt, but its interior remained unaltered.

== Description ==
The palace was distinguished for its portico with two arcades, one in the Corso and the other in via Barone San Giuseppe; in the eleventh chapter of his work entitled "Discorso storico della opulenta città di Alcamo situata a piè del Monte Bonifato, e dell'antichissima città di Longarico ossia Lacarico, dopo detta Alcamo, su di esso monte" Ignazio De Blasi, the famous historian from Alcamo wrote:

la Loggia vecchia casa della città, destinata per i negozi pubblici dell'Università, e dove si convocava il pubblico consiglio per gli affari dello stato, di bellissima architettura, con vari archi e porte nel mezzo degli archi, sostenute da pilastri intagliati d'ordine dorico e ionico. (That is: the Loggia which was the old Town Hall, intended for the public business of University, and where the Council held its meetings, of beautiful architecture, with several arches and doors in the middle of them, sustained by carved pillars of Doric and Ionian order.)

The façade is quite rich and imposing, with a high pedestal in shiny travertine and lesenes ending with fluted corbels; the main door is located in Corso 6 Aprile: there is a round arch made with ashlars. In addition, in via Barone san Giuseppe there are four entrances on the ground floor and three balconies with stone galleries. In the Corso there is also a big balcony with wrought iron and three entries.

== See also ==
- Ex Jesuits' College
- Jesuits
- Ignazio De Blasi

== Sources ==
- Roberto Calia: I Palazzi dell'aristocrazia e della borghesia alcamese; Alcamo, Carrubba, 1997
- Ignazio De Blasi: Discorso storico della opulenta città di Alcamo situata a piè del Monte Bonifato e dell'antichissima cittù di Longarico; trascrizione del manoscritto originale e realizzazione di Lorenzo Asta; Alcamo, 1989
- Carlo Cataldo: Guida storico-artistica dei beni culturali di Alcamo, Calatafimi, Castellammare del Golfo, Salemi e Vita, Sarograf-Alcamo (1982)
- P.M. Rocca: Di alcuni antichi edifici di Alcamo; Palermo, tip. Castellana-Di Stefano, 1905
- Francesco Maria Mirabella: Alcamensia noterelle storiche con appendice di Documenti inediti; Alcamo, ed. Sarograf, 1931
