= Piazza Ciullo =

Town square in Alcamo, Italy

Coordinates: 37.97997°N 12.96505°E

- {{{other_names}}}
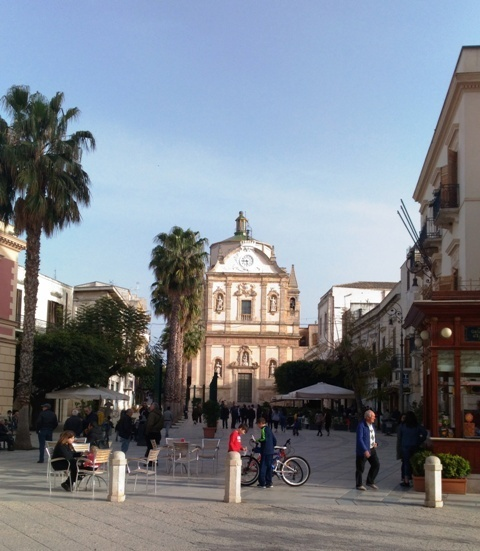
- Features: Church of Jesus, Ex Collegio dei Gesuiti, Church of the Holy Family, Church of Saint Olivia
- Opened: 1600
- Surface: stone
- Location: Alcamo, Italy
- Interactive map of Piazza Ciullo
- Coordinates

Piazza Ciullo is the main square of Alcamo, in the province of Trapani, Sicily, Italy. Being located in the very town centre, it is a meeting place for people and an attraction for important events, especially for teenagers.

== History ==
According to some historical sources, in 1500 a watercourse crossed Piazza Ciullo: the ditch, where it ran, filled up with water during winter, but after a few centuries the area took its present form. Today traces of the stream's existence are seen through the particular position of the buildings, whose profiles are made to stand out through the pavement lines after architect Gae Aulenti's restoration work.

In the 16th century there were a number of houses with courts inside them and churches within the town; many houses were built on the east-west axis towards Porta Trapani. The banks of the stream were very suitable for the construction of new churches. The Church of Saint Olivia was built first in 1533, then the Church of the Holy Family (after 1650), the Collegio or Church of Jesus (1684), and the Ex Chiesa di Santa Maria dello Stellario (constructed in 1605, demolished in 1962 and the seat of a bank now).

The area became important in the first half of the 16th century due to events such as the passage and stay of the emperor Charles V (in 1535), and later the construction of the Church of Jesus by the Jesuits in 1650, which gave the square its characteristic shape.

The present square has risen with the union of the forecourts of three churches: Saint Olivia, Stellario (1625) and the Chiesa del Collegio (1650).

It was originally called Piazza Maggiore, then until 1875 Piano Sant'Oliva, and finally Piazza Ciullo, in honour of the great poet Ciullo d'Alcamo, the author of the famous love contrast "Rosa fresca aulentissima".

== Description ==
Piazza Ciullo has an oblong shape, and it is characterised by two parallel sides, winding like the ancient walls no longer in existence. The imposing Baroque façade of the Church of Jesus is visible with a large circular clock in the upper part, the architectural ensemble of the Ex Collegio dei Gesuiti next to it, then the Church of the Holy Family, Palazzo Comunale (Town Hall) and the Church of Saint Olivia, founded in 1533 and rebuilt in 1723 after Giovanni Biagio Amico's project. Just opposite the Town Hall is the Liberty building, once the seat of the post office.

In 1919, at the corner with Corso 6 Aprile, a wooden kiosk (in Liberty style) was placed that served drinks and decoctions: today it is an ice cream and sandwich shop.

Until 1929, at the corner with via Porta Stella, there was a fountain built by sculptor Antonino Gaggini, Antonello's son; there were additionally two shields and the coat of arms of Alcamo in a frame with a Latin inscription. Below the square, on its north side and going down the steps, is Piazza Mercato.

=== Restoration ===
In 1952 the square was paved by the local authorities. The last restoration in 1996 as part of Gae Aulenti's restoration project has led to new flooring and new street furniture, following the guidelines of the stream which crossed the square and disappeared.

The renovation of the main square of Alcamo, which also included the placing of the much-discussed ‘’green poles’’ (T-shaped profiles which light it instead of the old lamps with cast iron poles), is still today the subject of lively discussion among those who argue that it has brought added value, and others who, on the contrary, see a quite striking contrast with the older part of the square. However, this lighting system, later used in other places, has taken the name of Sistema Alcamo.

Today the whole square, and part of Corso 6 Aprile, is a pedestrian area.

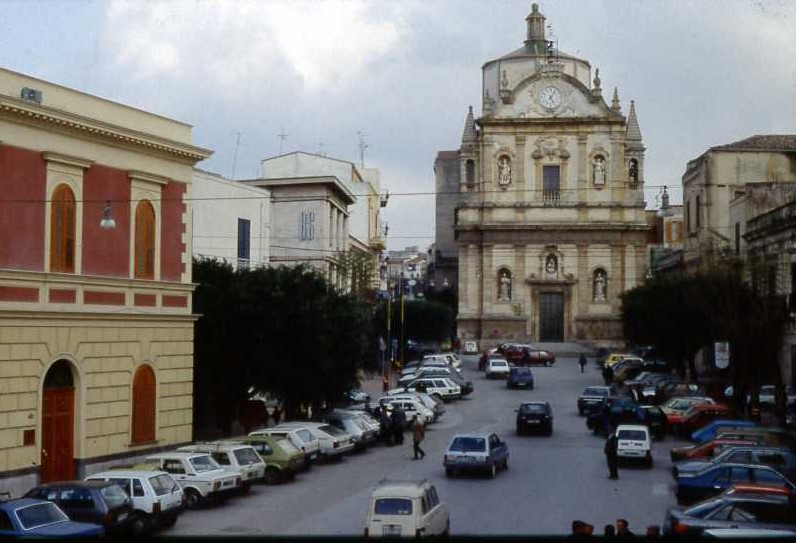
An early 1990s photo

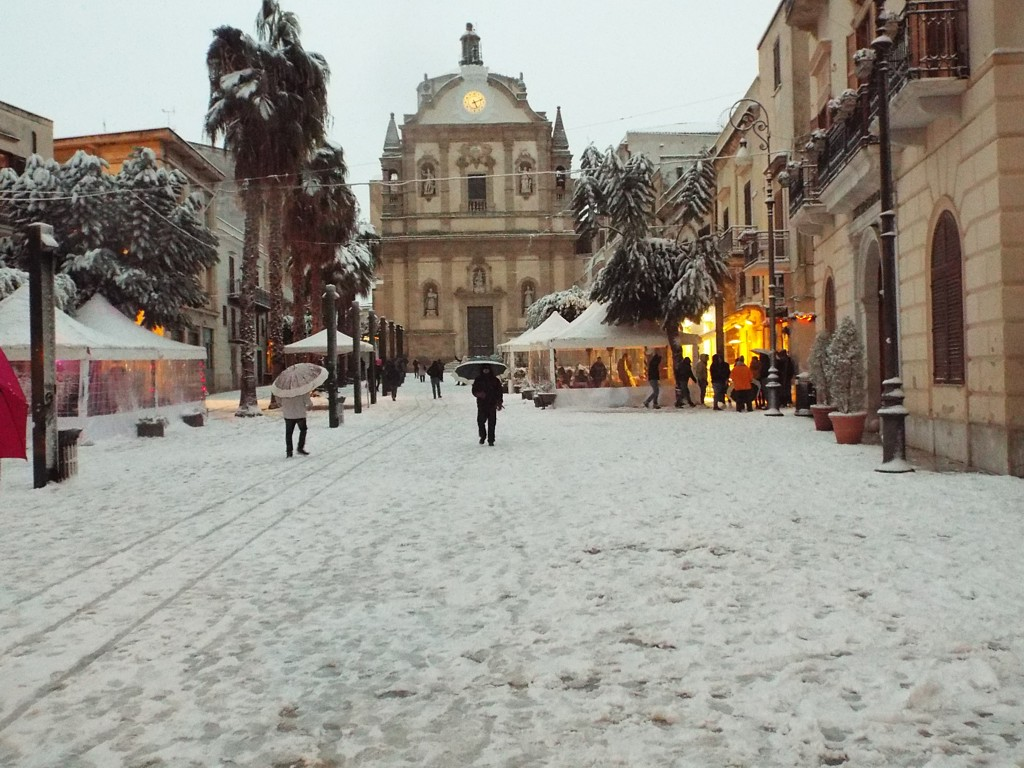
Piazza Ciullo snow-covered

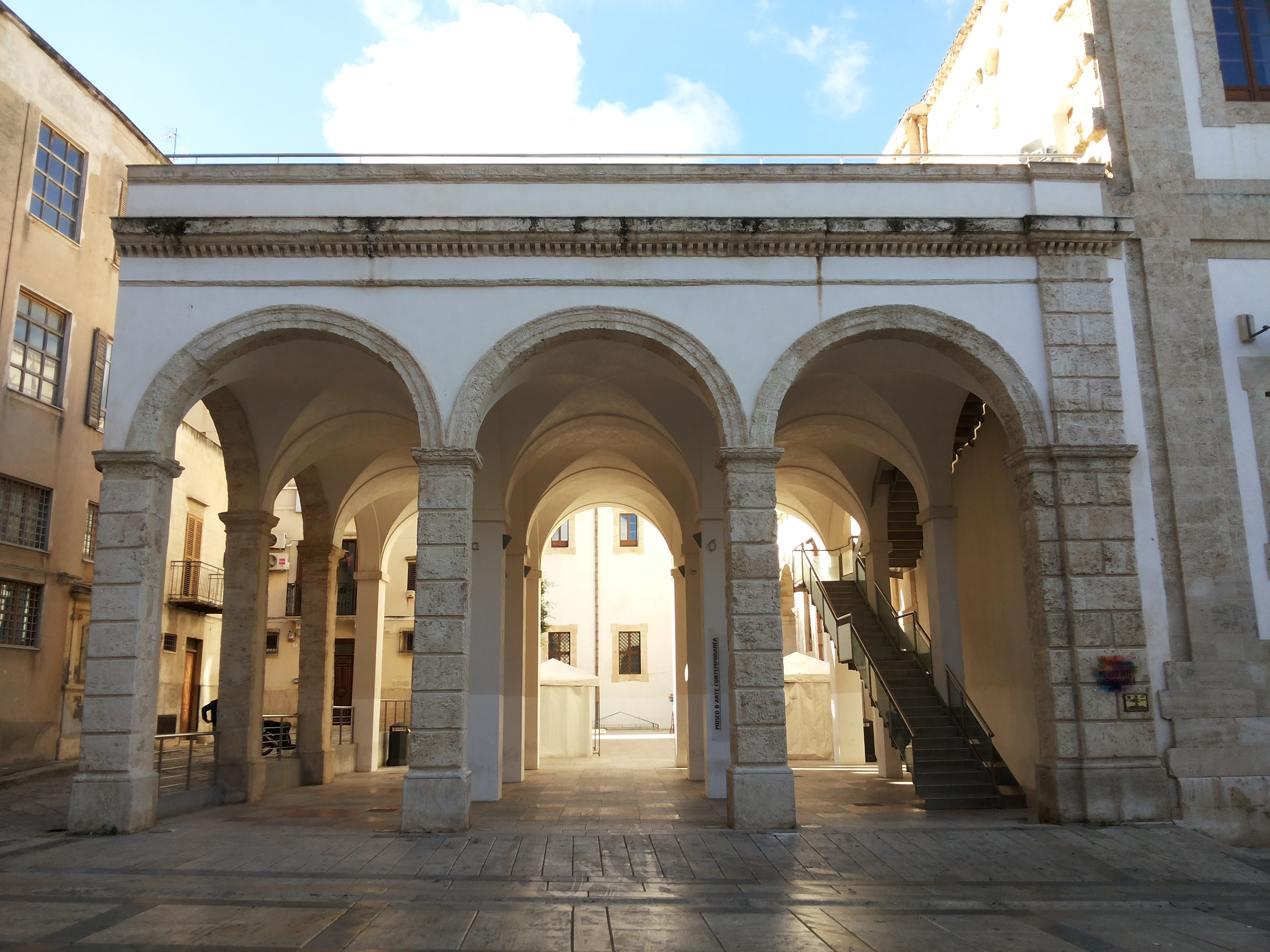
The arcade of Ex Collegio dei Gesuiti

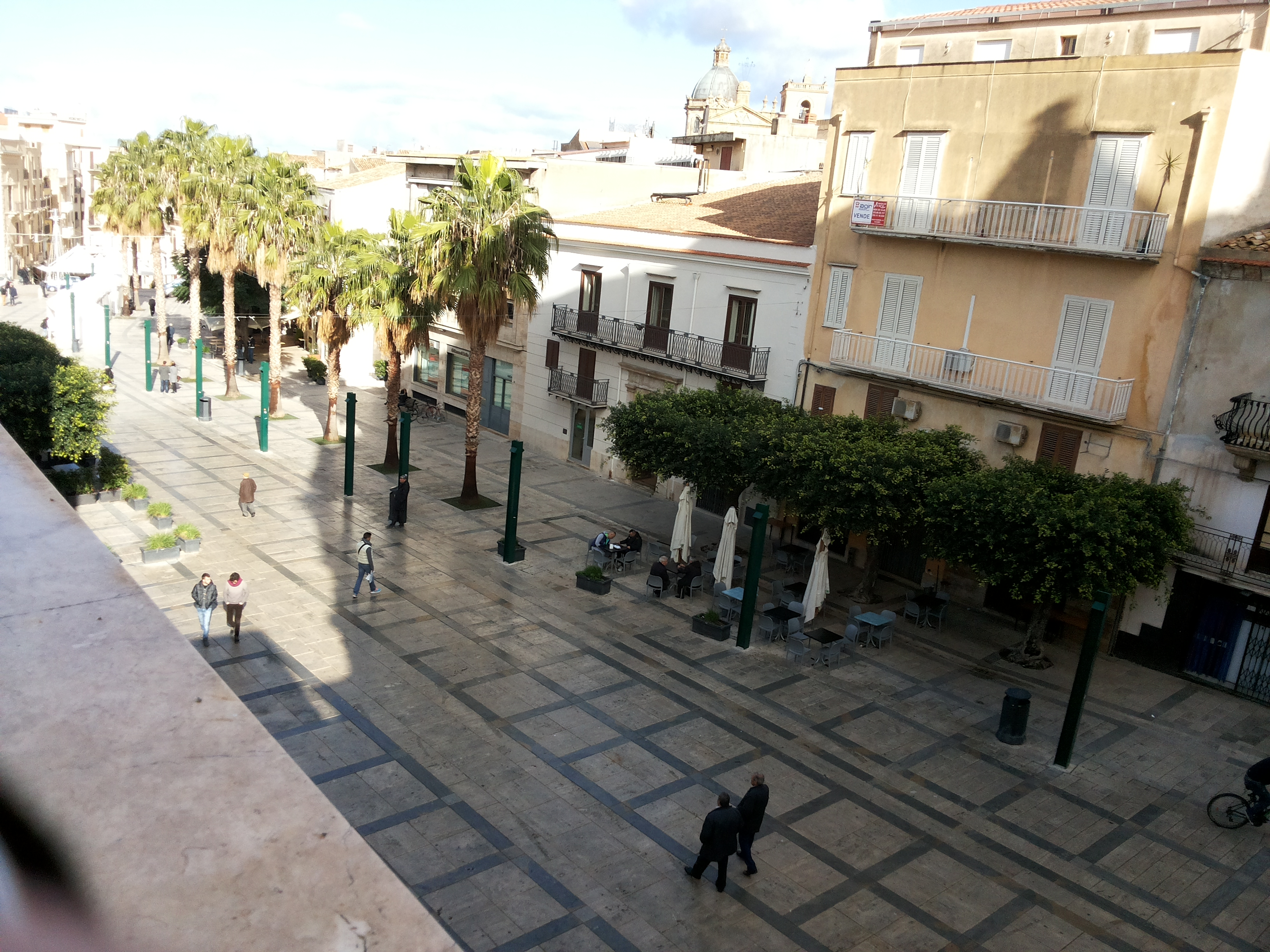
The square seen from above

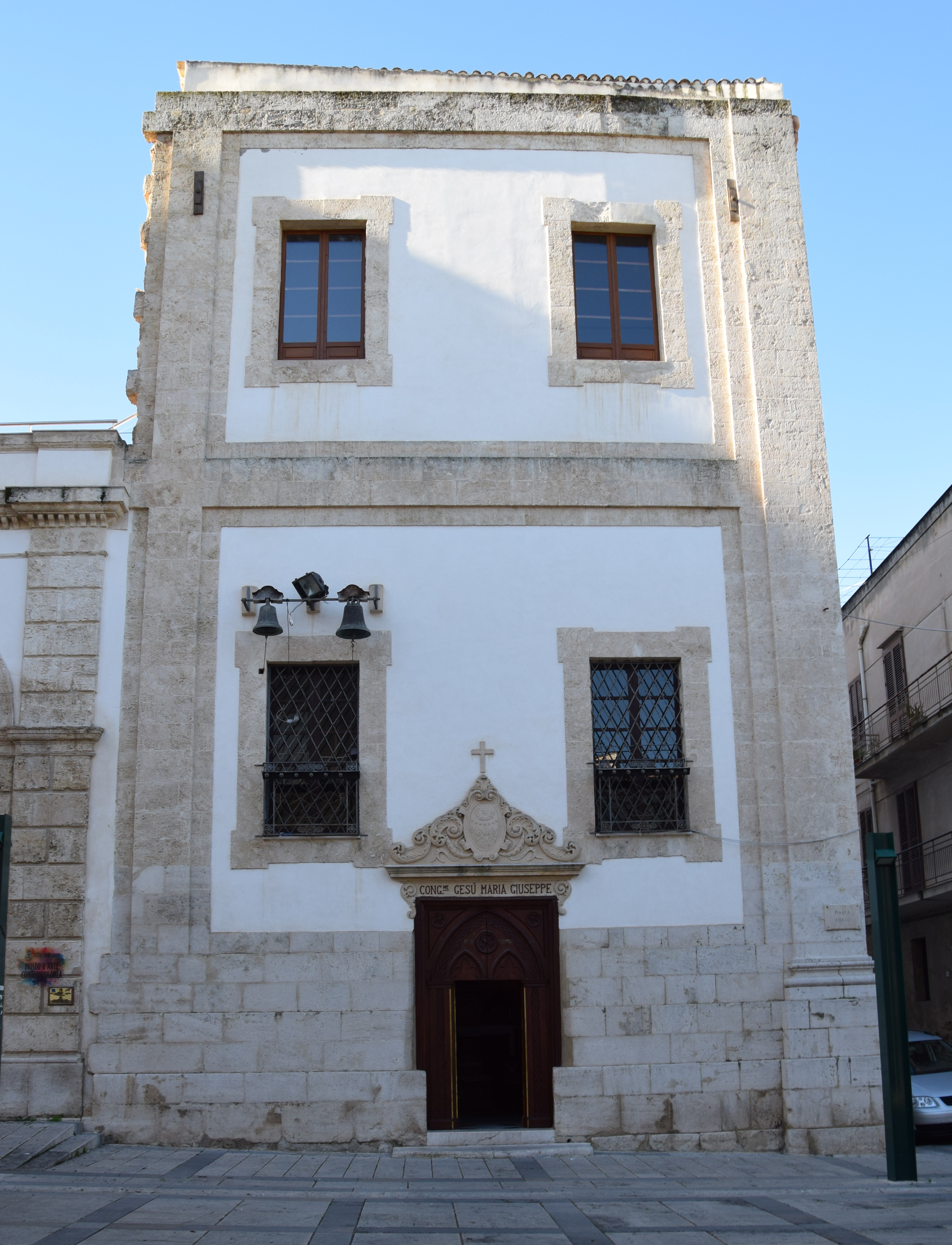
The Church of the Holy Family

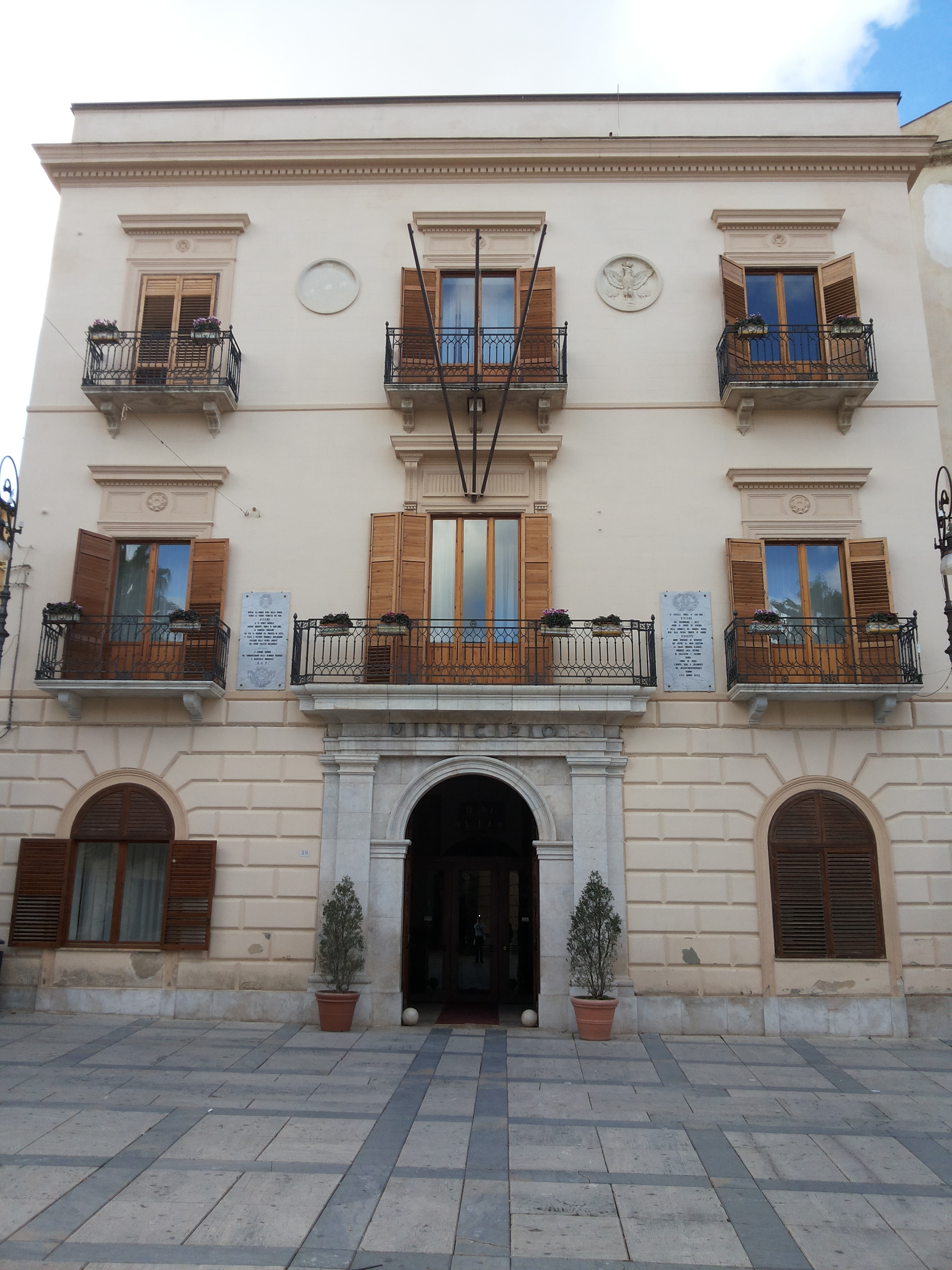
Palazzo Comunale (the Town Hall)

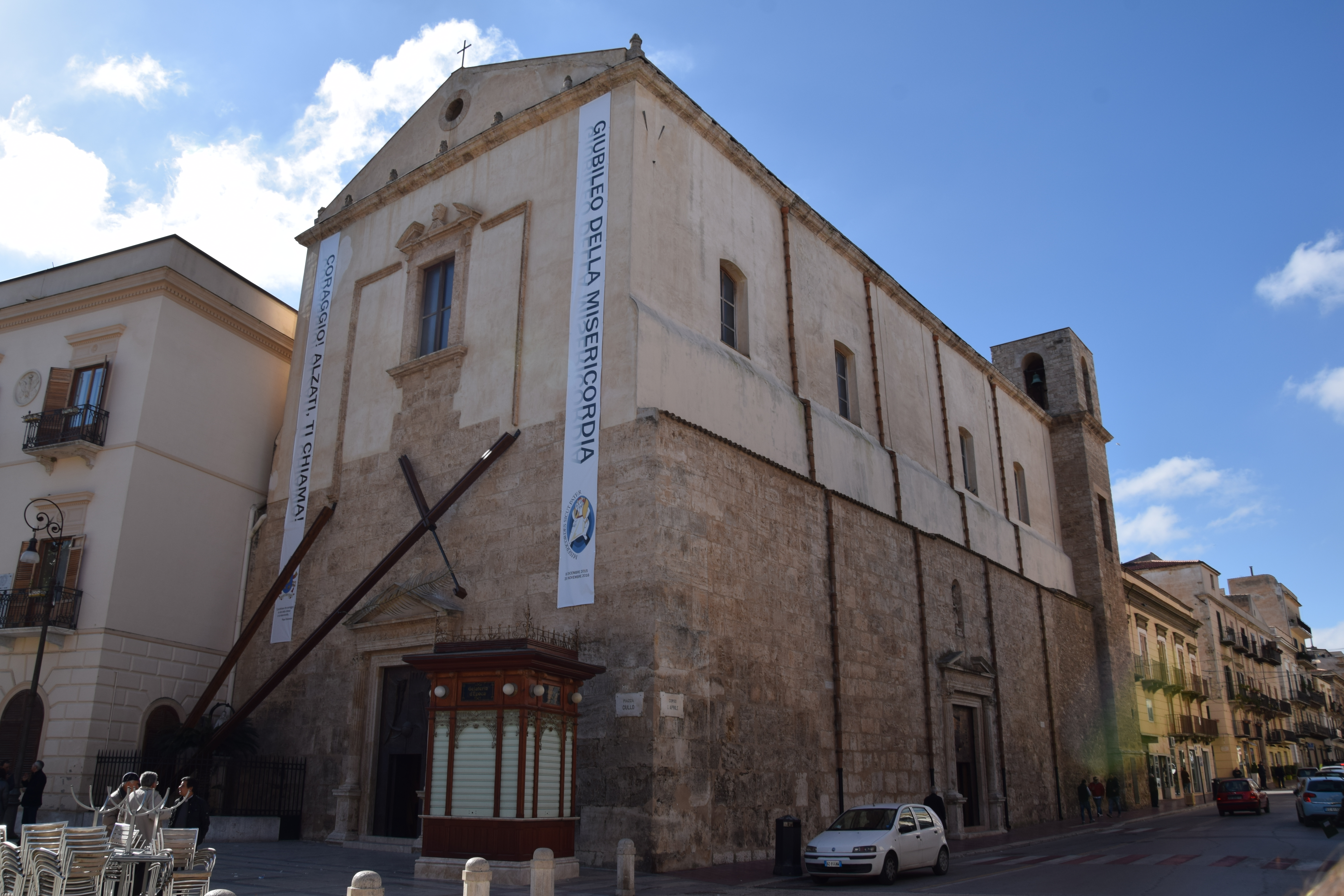
The Church of Saint Olivia

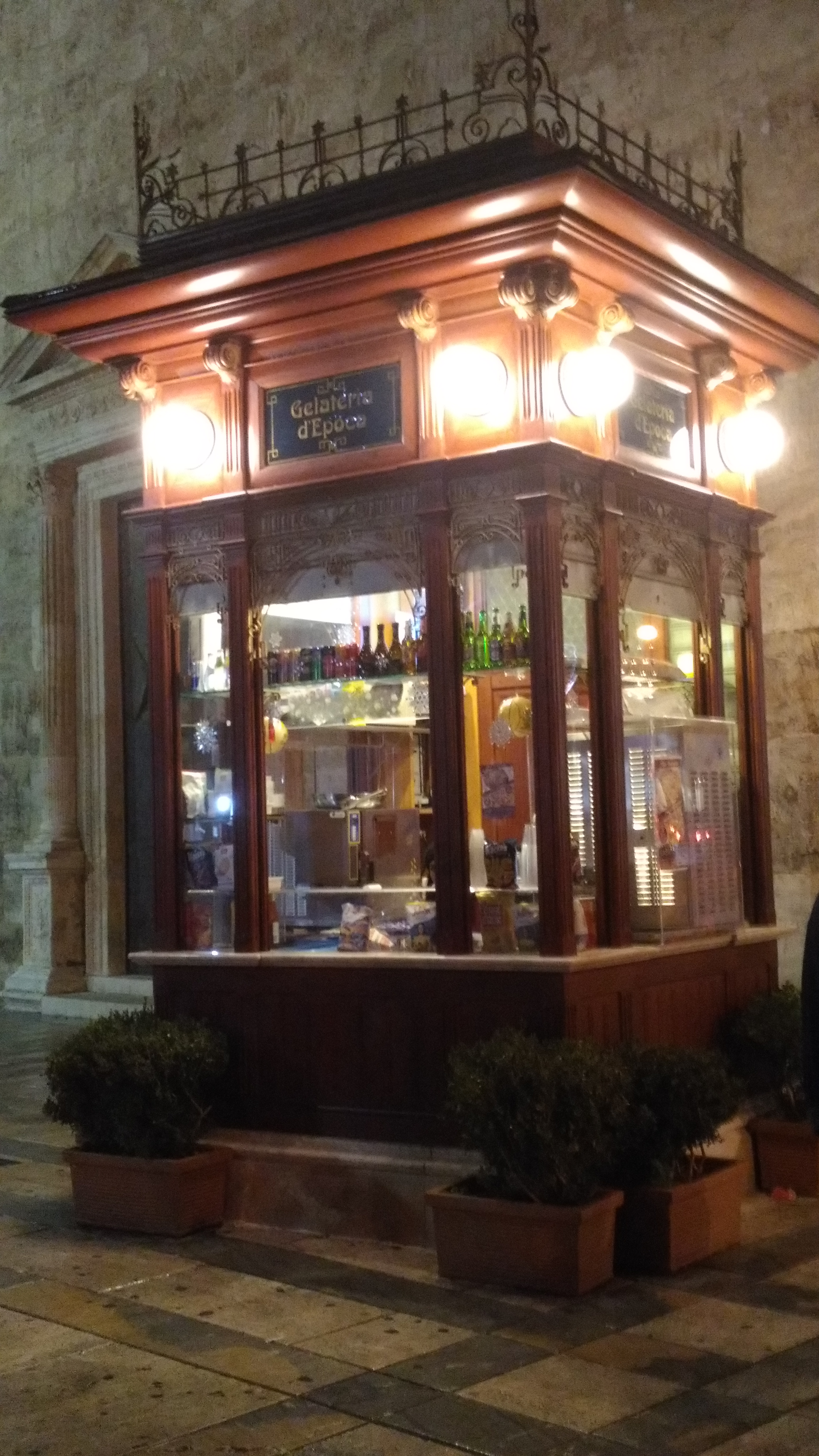
The Liberty kiosk

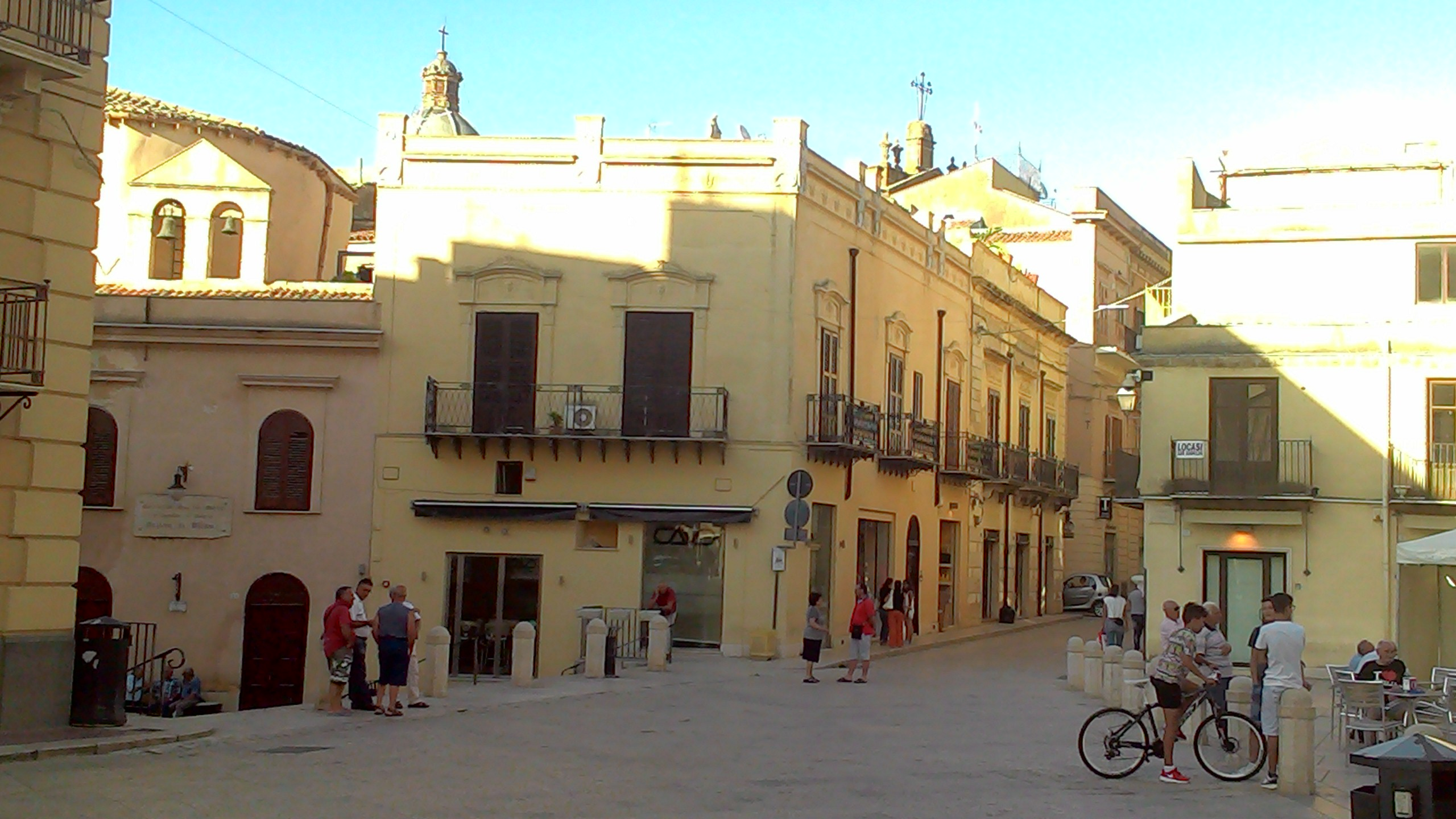
The crossroad between Corso 6 Aprile and Piazza Mercato

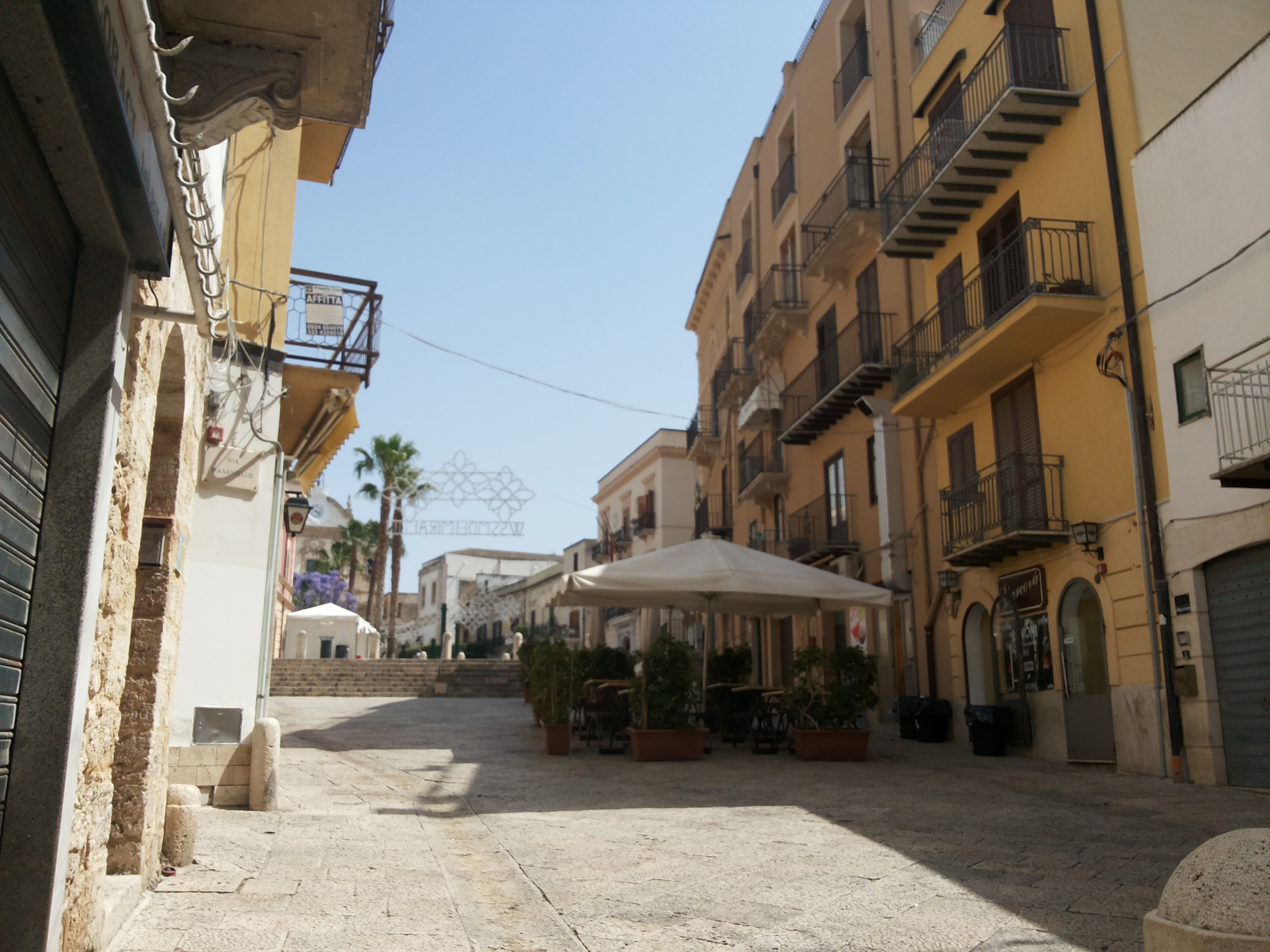
Piazza Mercato

== See also ==
- Piazza Bagolino
- Piazza della Repubblica (Alcamo)
- Cielo d'Alcamo
- Gae Aulenti

== Sources ==
- "Historia Alcami: Piazza Ciullo". 2018-03-04.
- "Piazza Ciullo a Alcamo". 2018-03-04.
- "Piazza Ciullo". 2018-03-04.
- "PIAZZA CIULLO". 2018-03-04.
- "Muore Gae Aulenti, aveva riqualificato Piazza Ciullo". 2018-03-04.
- "Piazze principali". 2018-03-04. Archived from the original on 2018-04-18.
- Calia, Roberto (1997). I palazzi dell'aristocrazia e della borghesia alcamese. Alcamo: Carrubba.
- De Blasi, Ignazio (1989). Discorso storico della opulenta città di Alcamo situata a piè del Monte Bonifato e dell'antichissima cittù di Longarico; trascrizione del manoscritto originale e realizzazione di Lorenzo Asta. Alcamo.
