= Chapel of Santissimo Salvatore, Alcamo =

Church building in Alcamo, Italy

Santissimo Salvatore
- Chiesetta del Santissimo Salvatore
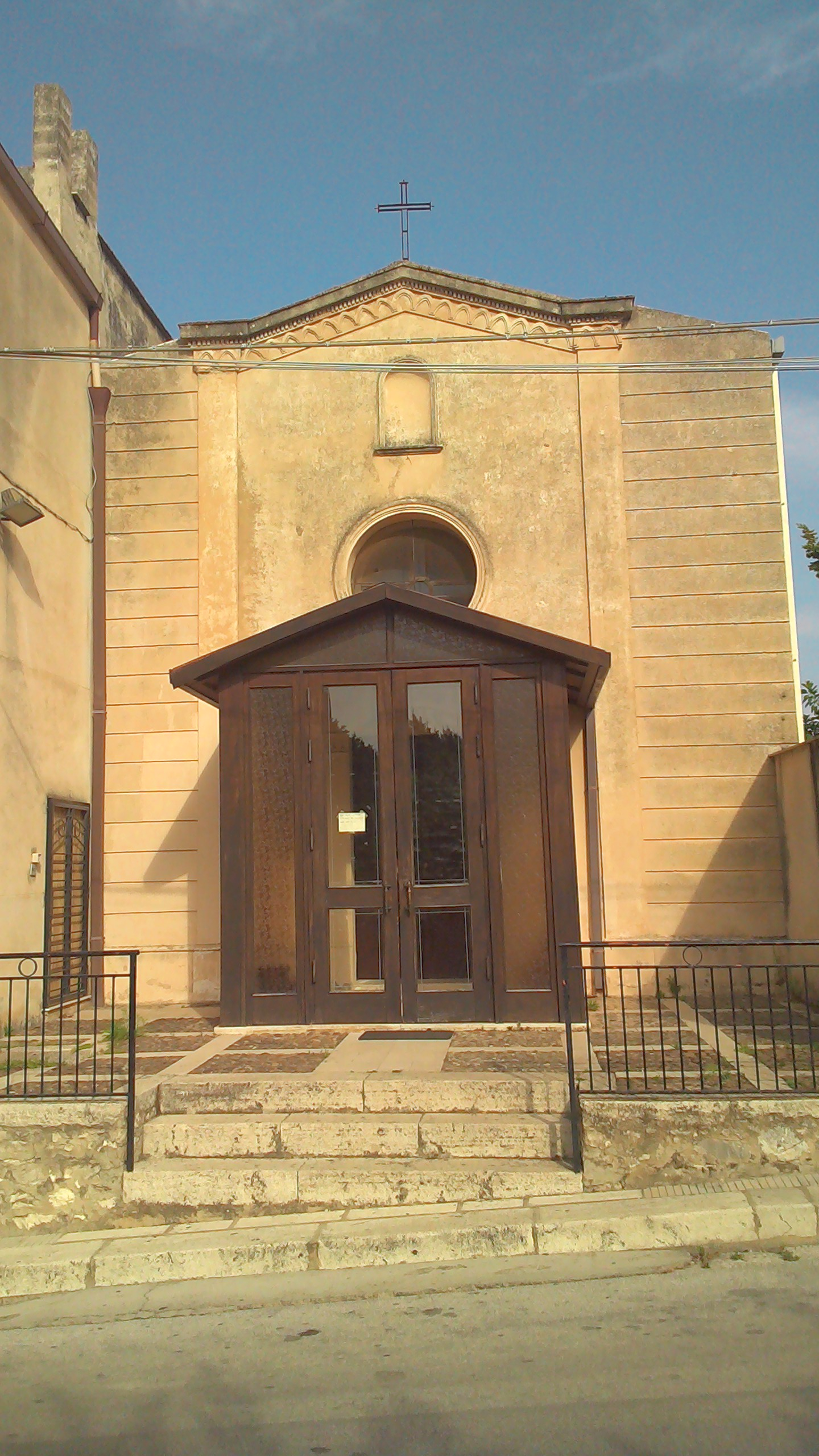
- The façade

Religion
- Affiliation: Catholic
- Province: province of Trapani
- Region: Sicily
- Rite: Catholic
- Patron: The Most Holy Saviour

Location
- Location: Alcamo, province of Trapani, Italy
- Municipality: Alcamo
- State: Italy
- Interactive map of Santissimo Salvatore
- Territory: Alcamo
- Coordinates: 37°58′20″N 12°57′58″E

Architecture
- Architects: Giuseppe Russo, an engineer
- Completed: 1942

The Chapel of Santissimo Salvatore ("Holy Saviour") is a Catholic church in Alcamo, in the province of Trapani.

== History ==
This church is mentioned in a document dated 1379; even the historian Ignazio De Blasi speaks about it and says that the Church, at the foot of mount Bonifato, was very old as it has the main door facing west and the Cappellone facing east, like in ancient times.

Next to the church, in 1531, there was the friary of the Fathers of the Our Lady of Mercy, also called of the Redemption because they were voted to the noble work of rescuing the Christians that were in the hands of the Turkish; since 1621 the Conventual Franciscans succeeded to the Order of Our Lady of Mercy. In 1639, the carpenters, called coopers ("bottai") had the right of patronage on it; the March Fridays were solemnized on the high altar for their devotion.

Some rooms were built at about 1890 on the remains of the friary by Father Salvatore Mannina, who lived there like a monk, together with some boys who wanted to set out to the clerical life.

In 1942, the Franciscan Alessandro Vincenzo Petralia, an army chaplain, made some internal restorations in the Church, after the design of Giuseppe Russo, an engineer; the façade was reconstructed in Gothic style.

From 1925 to 1942, the Congregation of Santissimo Salvatore was operative here, and after its statute, besides the feast of Saint Lucy, the members had to work in order to solemnize the feast of the Titular, which occurred on the first Sunday following 6 August (the Holy Saviour's holiday).

The inhabitants of the quarter and the families on holiday in that "contrada" took part to the feast; after the Low Masses and the Sung Masses in the morning, there was the afternoon procession. There were also band concerts, the greasy poles, arches made with paper and lights or small baskets made with coloured transparent paper, in this popular midsummer festival (sagra) sometimes there were fireworks too.

After the 1968 Belice earthquake, the church was entrusted to the parson of the Church of the Holy Heart and they made further restorations in the early eighties: these interventions were providential and served to revive the interest on the small Church, avoiding its feared sale.

Besides, it worked as the see of the new parish of Madonna del Riposo, elevated in 1986 by the bishop of Trapani, awaiting the building of a new and larger church, but after some years, they did not do anything about it.

== Description and works ==
- High altar: a painting representing the Holy Saviour, realized in 1898 by Angelo Tamajo, a painter and photographer working in Alcamo at the end of the 19th century.
- On a wall: a painting of Our Lady of Riposo by Francesco di Giovanni (1989), a reproduction of the one painted by Giuseppe Renda
- In the sacristy: oval painting of Madonna del Riposo, made by Mariella Novara in 1982.

== See also ==
- Church of Madonna del Riposo (Alcamo)
- Church of the Holy Heart (Alcamo)
- Conventual Franciscans

== Sources ==
- "Carlo Cataldo - Accanto alle Aquile". www.trapaninostra.it (in Italian).
- Cataldo Carlo: Accanto alle aquile: Il castello alcamese di Bonifato e la chiesa di S. Maria dell’Alto p. 98–101; Brotto, Palermo, 1991
- Cataldo Carlo: tradizioni religiose di Alcamo p. 18; ed. Campo, Alcamo, 1984
- Mirabella Francesco Maria: Alcamo sacra p. 336; Accademia di studi cielo d'Alcamo Tip. Cartografica, Alcamo, 1956
