= Santissimo Salvatore =

Santissimo Salvatore may refer to the following churches in Italy:

- Basilica of Santissimo Salvatore, Pavia, Lombardy
- Chapel of Santissimo Salvatore, Alcamo, Trapani, Sicily
- Santissimo Salvatore, Alcamo, Trapani, Sicily
- Santissimo Salvatore, Bologna, Emilia-Romagna
- Santissimo Salvatore, Borgomasino, Turin
- Santissimo Salvatore, Erice, Sicliy
- Santissimo Salvatore, Naples, in Piscinola
- Santissimo Salvatore, Nicosia, Enna, Sicily
- Santissimo Salvatore, Noto, Sicily
- Santissimo Salvatore, Palermo, Sicily

== See also ==
- Festa del Santissimo Salvatore a Pazzano, a festival in Reggio Calabria, Italy
- Forte del Santissimo Salvatore or Castello del Santissimo Salvatore, a fort in Messina, Sicily
- Salvator Mundi, a depiction of Christ
