= Narraweena =

- Suburb
- Interactive map of Narraweena
- Country: Australia
- State: New South Wales
- City: Sydney
- LGA: Northern Beaches Council
- Location: 18 km (11 mi) north-east of Sydney CBD

Government
  - State electorate: Wakehurst
  - Federal divisions: Mackellar; Warringah
- Elevation: 78 m (256 ft)

Population
  - Total: 6,971 (2021 census)
- Postcode: 2099
Suburbs around Narraweena
Oxford Falls	Cromer
Beacon Hill	Narraweena	Dee Why
	Brookvale

Narraweena is a suburb of northern Sydney, in the state of New South Wales, Australia. Narraweena is 18 kilometres north-east of the Sydney central business district, in the local government area of Northern Beaches Council and is part of the Northern Beaches region.

Narraweena has two primary schools; Narraweena Public School and St John the Apostle Narraweena Catholic School.

== History ==
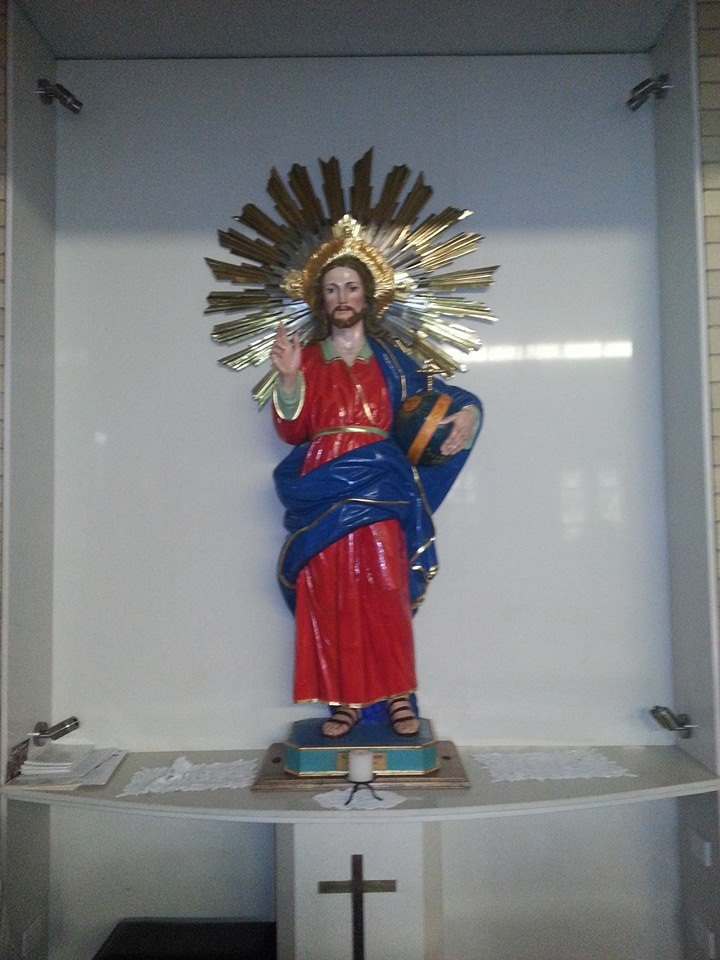
St. Salvatore statue in St John Apostol church

Narraweena is an Aboriginal name meaning a quiet place in the hills. The suburb developed after World War II, when the land was subdivided, Narraweena Post Office opening on 1 April 1953.

Italian people from Pazzano since the 1980s have organised an annual Santo Salvatore's fiest, with a statue very similar to the original that is taken from the Catholic church of Narraweena around the suburb and back.

It is also home to a notable community of settlers from Gizzeria, Calabria and their descendants.

== Transport ==
Keolis orthern Beaches operates five bus routes through the suburb of Narraweena:

- 160X: Dee Why to Chatswood
- 166: Frenchs Forest to Manly
- 174X: Narraweena to City Wynyard
- 178: Cromer Heights to Warringah Mall
- 179: Wheeler Heights to Warringah Mall

CDC NSW operates one bus route through the suburb of Narraweena:

- 193: Austlink to Warringah Mall
