= Madonna del Riposo, Alcamo =

Church building in Alcamo, Italy

Madonna del Riposo
- Chiesetta della Madonna del Riposo
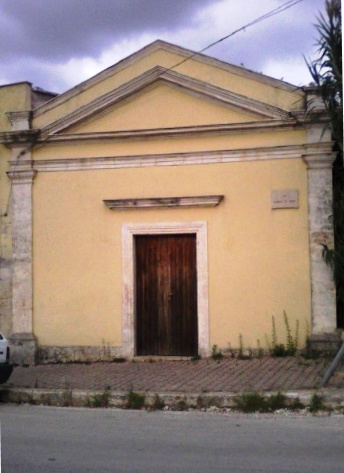
- The facade

Religion
- Affiliation: Catholic
- Province: province of Trapani
- Region: Sicily
- Rite: Catholic
- Patron: Our Lady of the Rest

Location
- Location: Alcamo, province of Trapani, Italy
- Municipality: Alcamo
- State: Italy
- Interactive map of Madonna del Riposo
- Territory: Alcamo
- Coordinates: 37°58′11″N 12°58′11″E

Architecture
- Founder: Diego Nicodemi
- Groundbreaking: 1656

Madonna del Riposo ("Our Lady of the Rest") is a Catholic church located in Alcamo, in the province of Trapani.

== History ==
In 1656 in the district called "Madonna del Riposo", at the foot of Mount Bonifato, they built a little Church in honour of the Madonna with the same title. The strip of land needed for its construction was donated by doctor Diego Nicodemi, and there are two notarial deeds, drawn up by the notary La Perna which attest the details; the land should have been about five metres and half long and four metres large. This piece of land was located in the feud of Costa and in contrada the pusaturi.

In 1939 the building was restored thanks to the offerings of the believers and the Virgilio family, the owner of this place, donated a painting on slate with the image of the Virgin Mary, assigned to Giuseppe Renda. They also made the electrical system, new vestments and some premises for the guardian, next to the sacristy.

In 1986 the bishop of Trapani had elevated it to the status of parish, already acknowledged with a decree by the Ministry of the Interior, and they had to build a larger Church; in 1988 father Pietro Filippi was appointed as the parson. It worked for a certain period as a parish in the small Church of the Holy Saviour (Santissimo Salvatore), in the same street leading to the top of Mount Bonifato, but after a few years all the decisions were shelved and they did nothing about it.

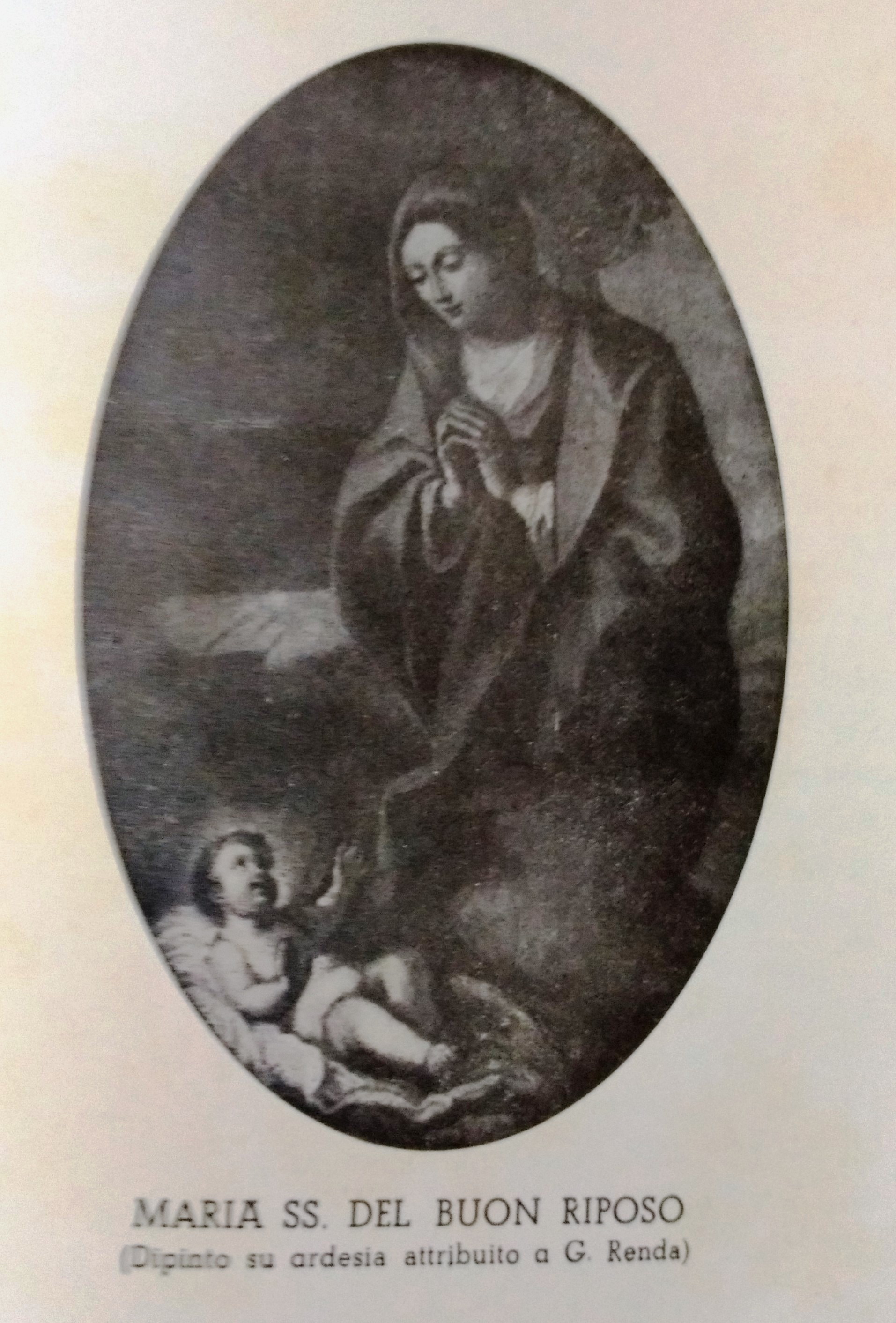
Madonna del Buon Riposo, painting on slate

== The feast ==
The oldest piece of information about the array ( the "apparato") for the festivity of Our Lady of the Rest dates back to 9 September 1665. The Church was reconstructed in the second half of the 19th century and in the twenties they entrusted it to the reverend Pietro Stellino, and later to Monsignor Giuseppe Barone.

Before the Belice earthquake, and during the feast, they celebrated two Low Masses and a sung Mass on the Sunday of the week dedicated to the Name of the Virgin Mary (which is on 12 September), they set up illuminations and the stalls of street vendors. There were also concerts held by the band and fireworks.

In 1968 the Church was damaged because of the Belice earthquake, then it was closed and the painting of the Madonna was taken by the Lipari family, the heirs of the Virgilios; so the feast has not been celebrated any longer.

== Sources ==
- Cataldo, Carlo. "Accanto alle Aquile". www.trapaninostra.it (in Italian).
- Cataldo Carlo: Accanto alle aquile: Il castello alcamese di Bonifato e la chiesa di S. Maria dell'Alto p. 98-101; Brotto, Palermo,1991
- Cataldo Carlo: tradizioni religiose di Alcamo p. 18; ed. Campo, Alcamo, 1984
- Mirabella Francesco Maria: Alcamo sacra p. 336; Accademia di studi Cielo d'Alcamo, Tip. Cartografica, Alcamo,1956
