= Sacro Cuore, Alcamo =

Church building in Alcamo, Italy

Chiesa del Sacro Cuore
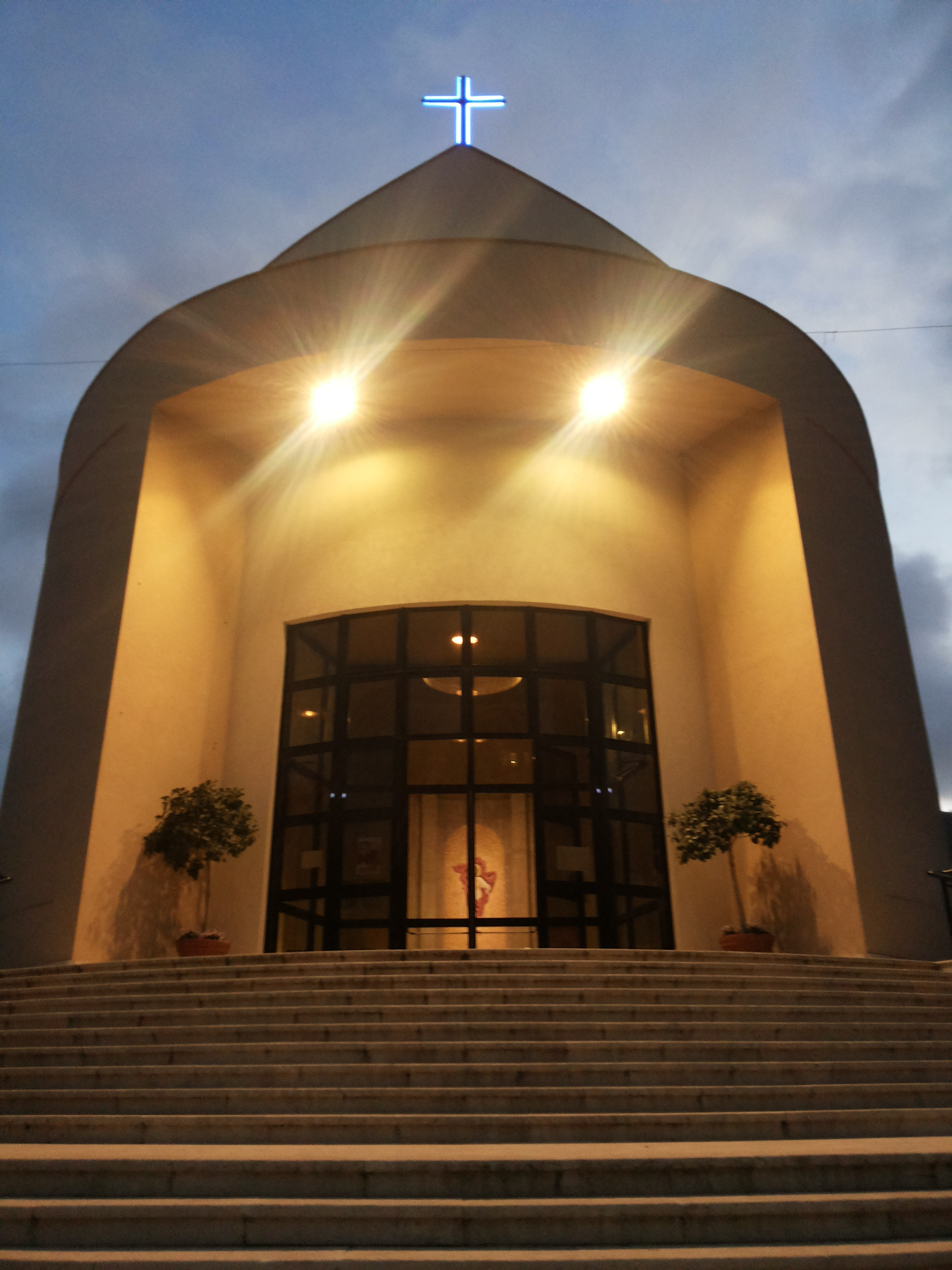
- The façade

Religion
- Affiliation: Catholic
- Province: province of Trapani
- Region: Sicily
- Rite: Catholic
- Patron: Holy Heart of Jesus
- Year consecrated: 1993

Location
- Location: Alcamo, province of Trapani, Italy
- Municipality: Alcamo
- State: Italy
- Interactive map of Chiesa del Sacro Cuore
- Territory: Alcamo
- Coordinates: 37°58′26″N 12°57′45″E

Architecture
- Architects: Li Santi, engineer Giuseppe Galizia
- Style: modern
- Groundbreaking: 1983
- Completed: 1991

Website
- http://sacrocuorealcamo.it/new_site/

Sacro Cuore ("Holy Heart") is a Catholic church located in Alcamo, in the province of Trapani.

== History ==
The parish of the Holy Heart of Jesus was established by the bishop of Trapani, monsignor Ricceri, on 4 October 1967. Several years before the Episcopal Curia (Catholic Church) of Trapani had bought a piece of land to build a Church which was to serve the new area that was expanding next to Viale Europa.

They started with a prefabricated structure, with a roof in asbestos cement, a hall, and two rooms; in 1978 they built the parsonage and other premises for the parish, but they had to wait until 1982 to start the real building which included the Church and the hall below it.

In 1987 Vincenzo Settipani, an architect, substituted Li Santi, who had died; he designed the mosaics, the stained glasses, the holy water stoups, the Baptismal font, the ambon and the altar. They were realized by the firm Pierotti from Pietrasanta (in the province of Lucca) and by the mosaicist Fabriano Fabret; the artistic and huge wooden confessional was made by the firm Gaspare Ferrantelli. The Church was completed in 1991 and was consecrated in 1993.

== Description and works ==
The Church is with one nave and has the characteristic of a roof shaped like a boat overturned; inside it there are these works:

- Stained glass-windows on the two side walls representing the Sacraments on one side, and the three Theological Virtues (Faith, Hope and Charity) on the other side
- Mosaic of the Holy Heart of Jesus (with a background in pure gold), in the apse
- Tabernacle shaped like a sphere
- Mosaic of saint John the Evangelist, on the right
- Mosaic of the Virgin Mary, on the left
- Stations of the Cross (Via Crucis), in mosaic, represented with 10 stations as in Saint Luke's gospel
- Saint Pio, a mosaic by Gaetano Costa
- Saint Margaret Mary Alacoque, mosaic by Gaetano Costa
- The Holy Family, mosaic by Gaetano Costa, above the main door
- The Holy Communion: a monolithic marble altar with two bas-reliefs on two (Melchisedec and Abel's offerings to God)
- baptismal font: in monolithic marble, deep enough for the baptism by immersion; it has the shape of the corolla of a flower with 8 petals. It is closed by a transparent dome which is surmounted by a dove, symbol of the Holy Ghost and purification.
- Ambon: with the figure of an Angel announcing the Resurrection; in pink marble as the baptismal font
- Chapel of the Holy Sacrament: the tabernacle is placed in the middle of a white marble cross; on the left, there is a block of white marble that looks like a window.

In the sacristy there is a wooden statue of the Holy Heart of Jesus, made by Giuseppe Stuflesser from Ortisei in 1967.

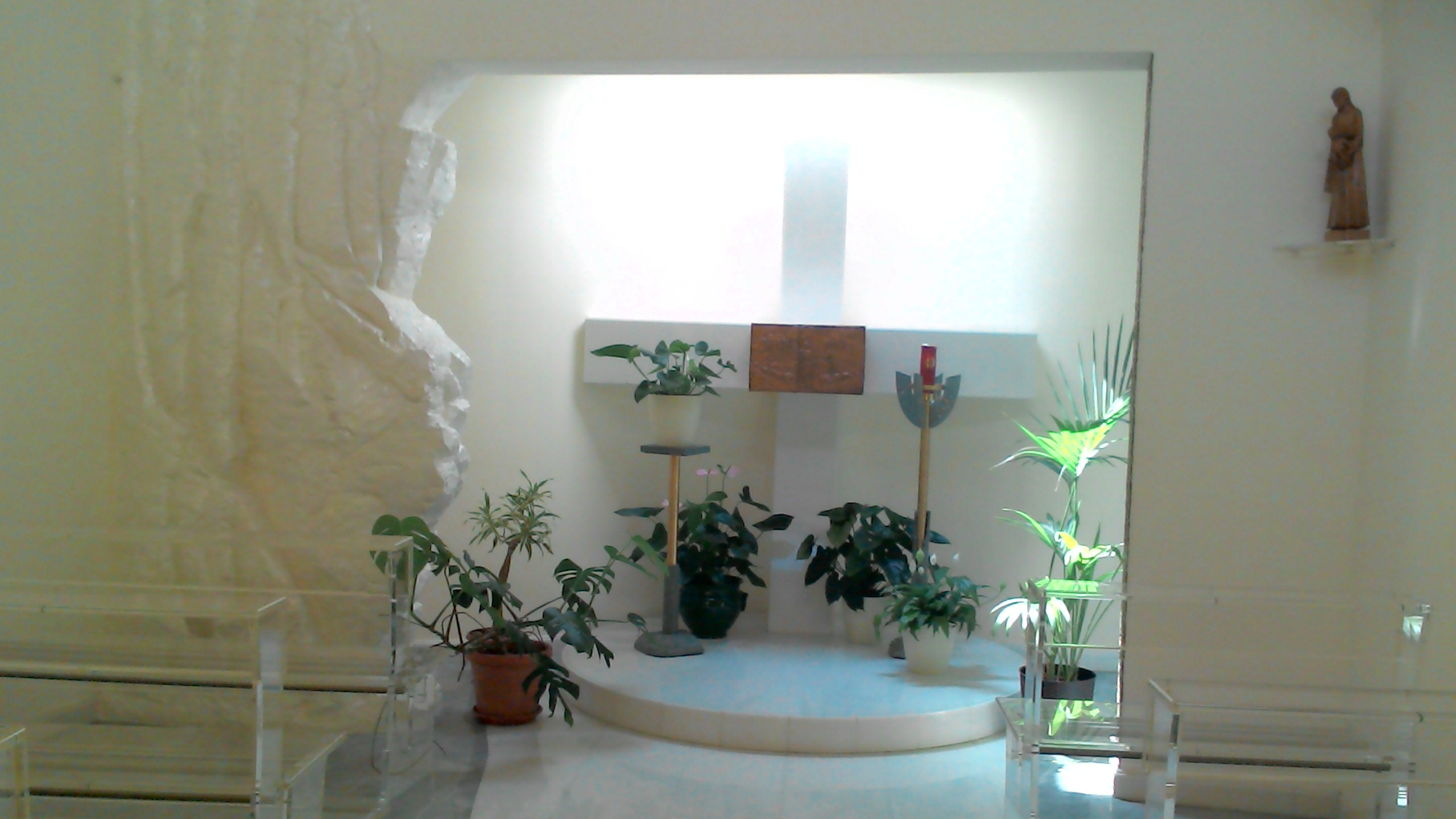
Chappel of the Holy Sacrament

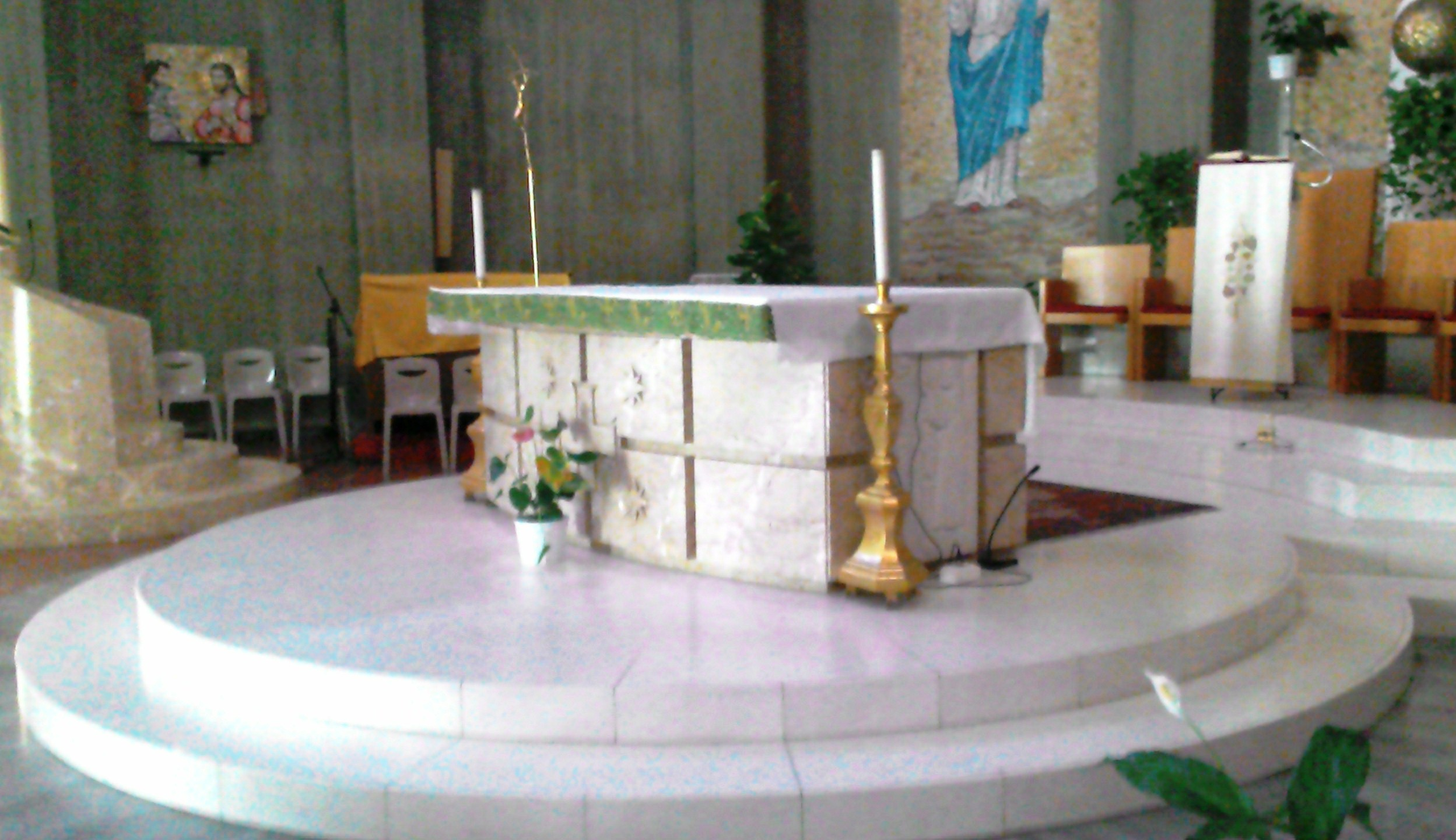
The Holy Communion

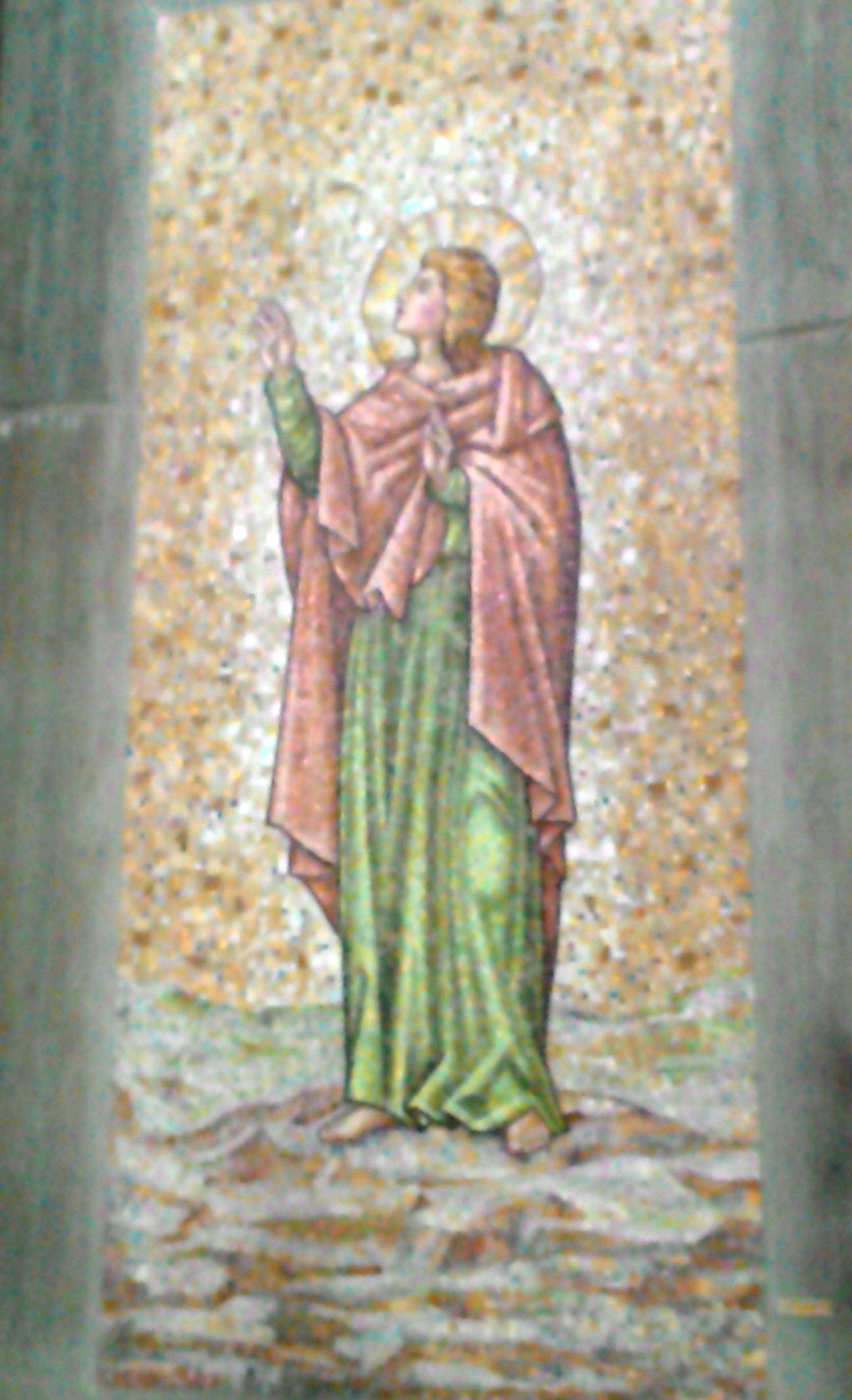
Saint John (mosaic)

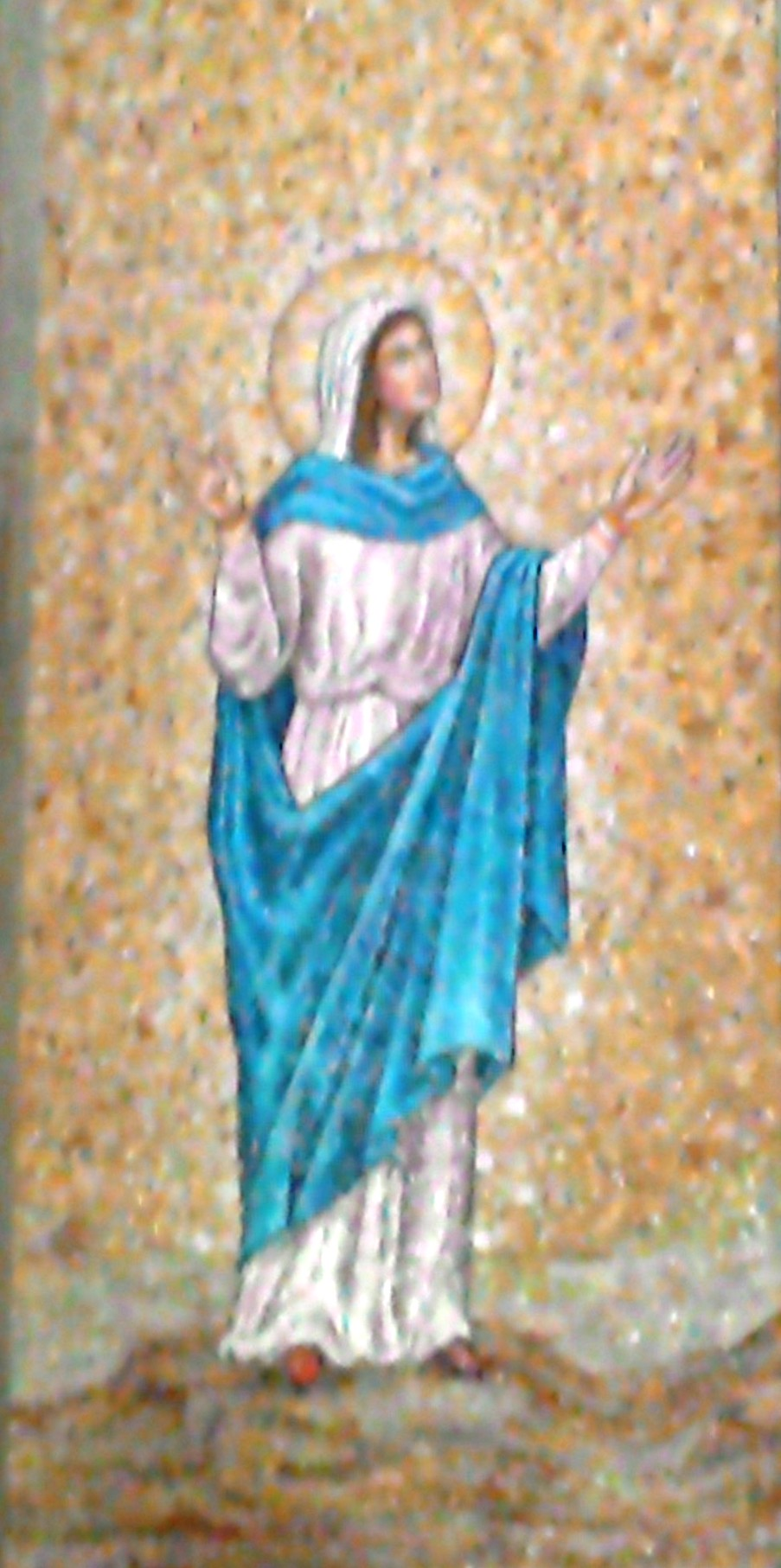
The Virgin Mary (mosaic)

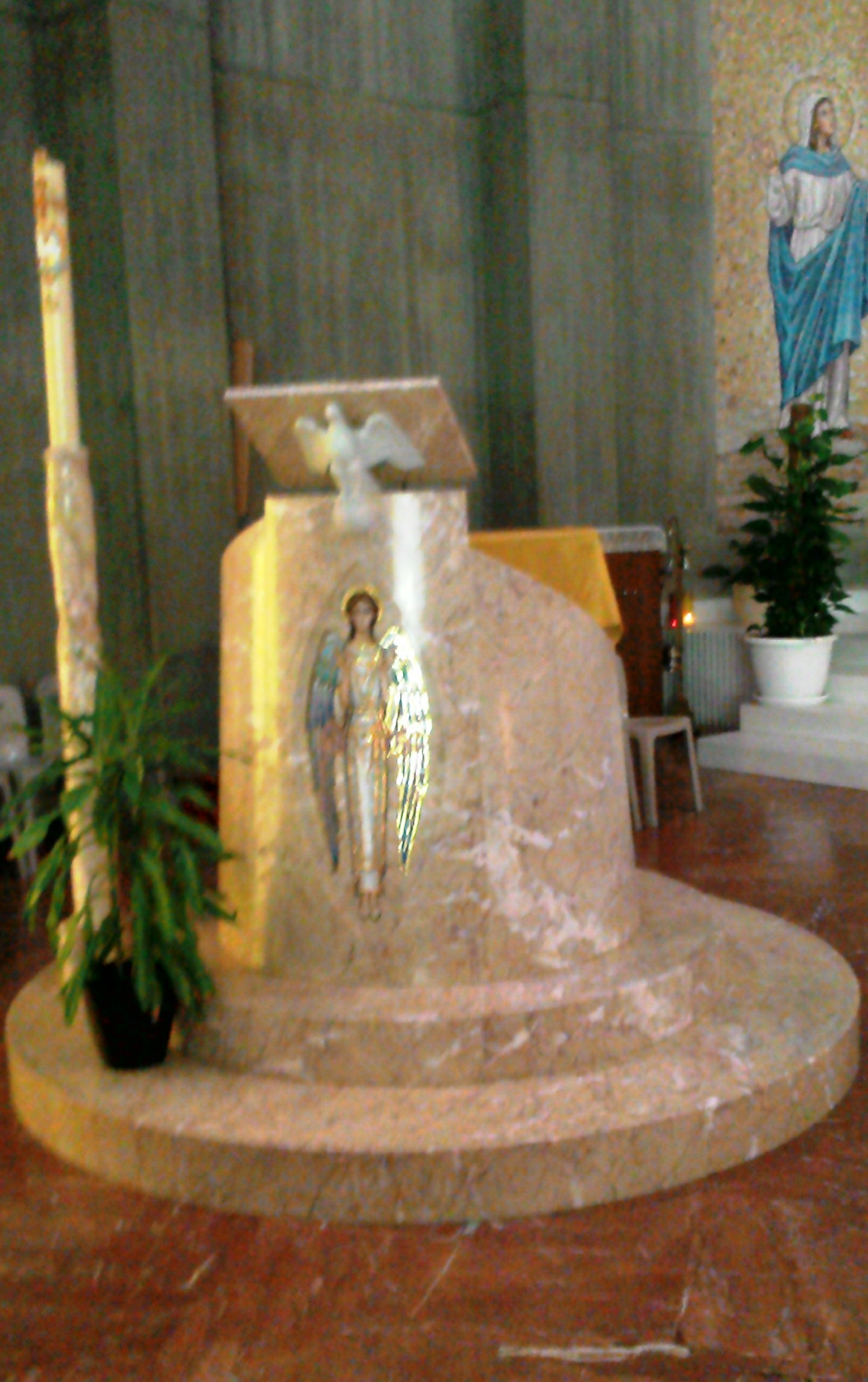
Lectern

== See also ==
- Catholic Church in Italy

== Sources ==
- Vincenzo Regina: La chiesa parrocchiale del Sacro Cuore di Gesù in Alcamo e il suo primo parroco; ed. Campo, 2005
- Carlo Cataldo: Guida Storico-Artistica dei Beni Culturali di Alcamo-Calatafimi-Castellammare del Golfo-Salemi-Vita; Sarograf, Alcamo, 1982
- Roberto Calia: Una città da scoprire: Alcamo; ed. Blu Imaging & ADV, Alcamo, 1991
