= Titular (Catholic Church) =

Cardinal with their own assigned church in Rome

In Roman Catholicism, a titular is a cardinal who holds a titulus, one of the main churches of Rome. Such holders were initially by tradition native-born Romans (of high social standing). The first church in Rome to have a non-Italian titular was Santi Quattro Coronati: Dietrich of Trier was appointed titular in 975 by Pope Benedict VII. That basilica was originally Titulus Aemilianae, drawing its name in characteristic fashion from its foundress, who doubtless owned the extensive suburban Roman villa whose foundations remain under the church and whose audience hall became the ecclesiastical basilica. The term also applies to the holder of a titular see, which is a nominal (often former) episcopal or archiepiscopal see without an actual pastoral flock which confers the rank of titular bishop on its incumbent.One of the traditions Catholics might hear of but know little about is that of a cardinal taking his "titulus" (i.e. titular church) in Rome. The concept of a titulus itself, some suggest, reaches back to antiquity when stones marked the confines of a property. When Christendom came to Rome this practice would seemingly be adopted with the name of a patron of that particular Christian community being referenced. (For example, what we now call Santa Pudentiana was at one time the "Titulus Pudentiana" related to the person of Pudentiana.) As Christendom grew in Rome, Rome came to be subdivided into territories or districts and tradition holds that there was around twenty five tituli in the primitive church within Rome.

So then, how does this concept of the tituli relate to the cardinals? The concept of a "cardinal" (a word that has its origins from the Latin word for "hinge" referring to something or something of importance) comes in relation to those who made up the chief administrative body of the church within Rome; counsellors and assistants to and under the authority of the bishop of Rome -- that is to say the Pope. Cardinal-deacons were given the responsibility of the "diaconiae" (which were the charitable outreaches within the city) while the Cardinal-priests were given responsibility over the tituli -- what today we would think of as parish churches. In a nutshell then, the tituli represented the various centres of worship within the city of Rome and each were assigned their respective "cardinales" -- in modern terms, effectively the parish priest or archpriest. When a cardinal is assigned and takes possession of his titular church in Rome what he is therefore doing is symbolically being made the titular (i.e. primary) priest of that church within Rome.

As the Church grew, and so with it the role and function of the cardinals in the administration of the Church in communion with the pope, this act has become more symbolic today than it is actual, however when one understands the historical background of how it relates to the primitive organization of the church in Rome, one can better understand the meaning and symbolism of it.

Not every church in Rome is a titular church. Churches are designated as a "titulus ecclesiae" by authority of the pope who can (and who historically have) also revoked such a status.

So then, in summary, just as we today are familiar with the idea of a "cathedral" as a designation that denotes the location of the seat (i.e. cathedra) of the local bishop, or that a "basilica" as an honorific title bestowed on particularly beautiful and important churches (frequently but not necessarily cathedrals), so too is a "titulus" a title that comes with specific reference to the most important churches within the city of Rome, to which each is assigned a cardinal.

The ceremonial act of a cardinal taking possession of his titular church can be seen below in these photos from 2011 when Cardinal Raymond Burke took possession of his own titular church, Sant'Agata dei Goti.
