= Festa del Santissimo Salvatore a Pazzano =

Catholic festival in Pazzano, Italy

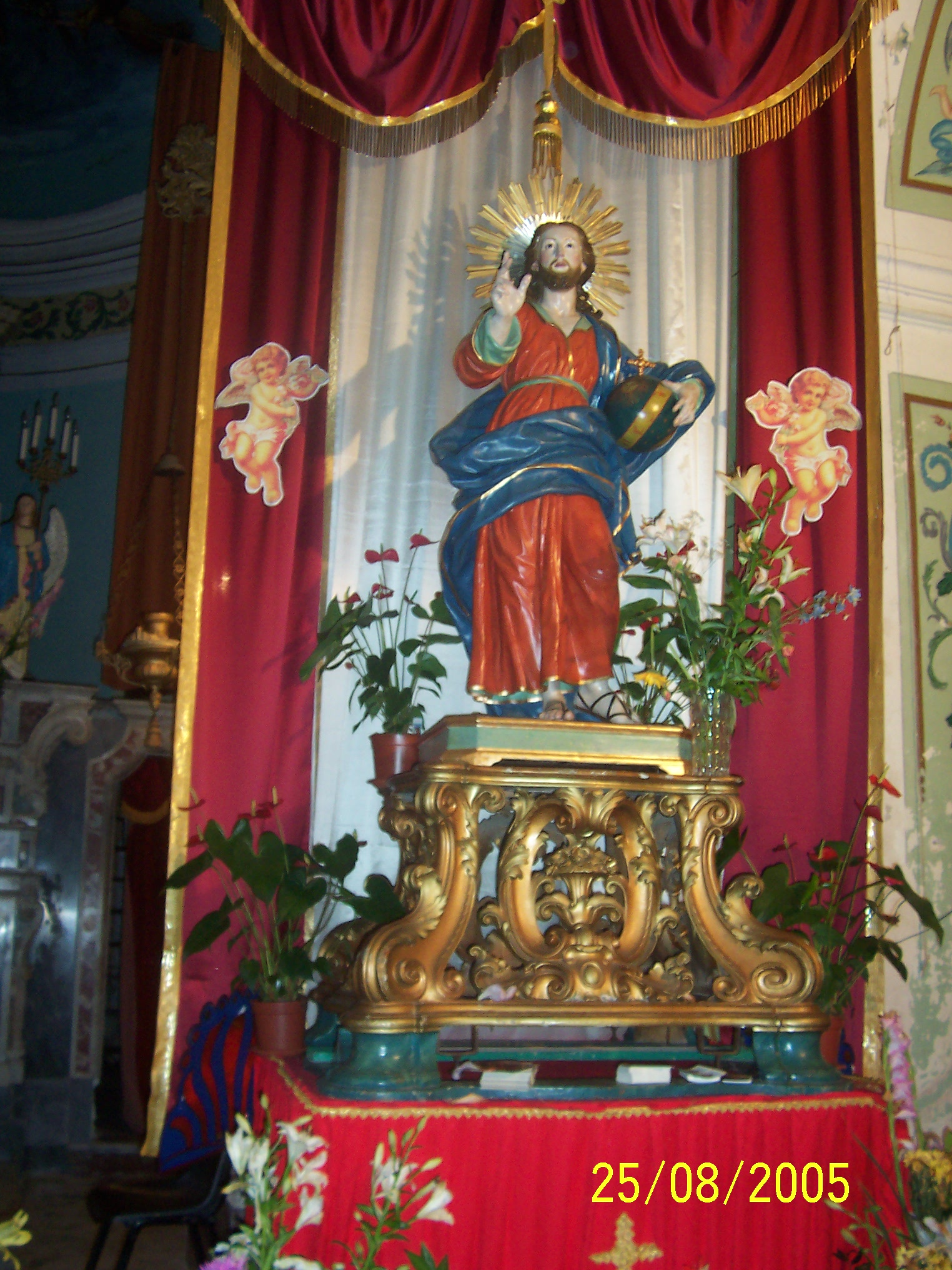
A statue of the Holy Saviour

Festa del Santissimo Salvatore a Pazzano (Calabrian: Festa dô Sarvaturi; 'Feast of the Holiest Saviour') is a three-day Catholic festival celebrated in Pazzano, Reggio Calabria, Italy, every first weekend after 5 August. It was originally the Byzantine celebration of the transfiguration of Christ, still observed today by both the Catholic and Orthodox churches on 6 August.

It is divided in a civil and religious program. Starting nine days before the feast, Novena (Calabrian: novina) is celebrated, consisting of the adoration of the Saviour's statue and the recitation prayers for nine days. Novena is preceded by a litany.

== History ==
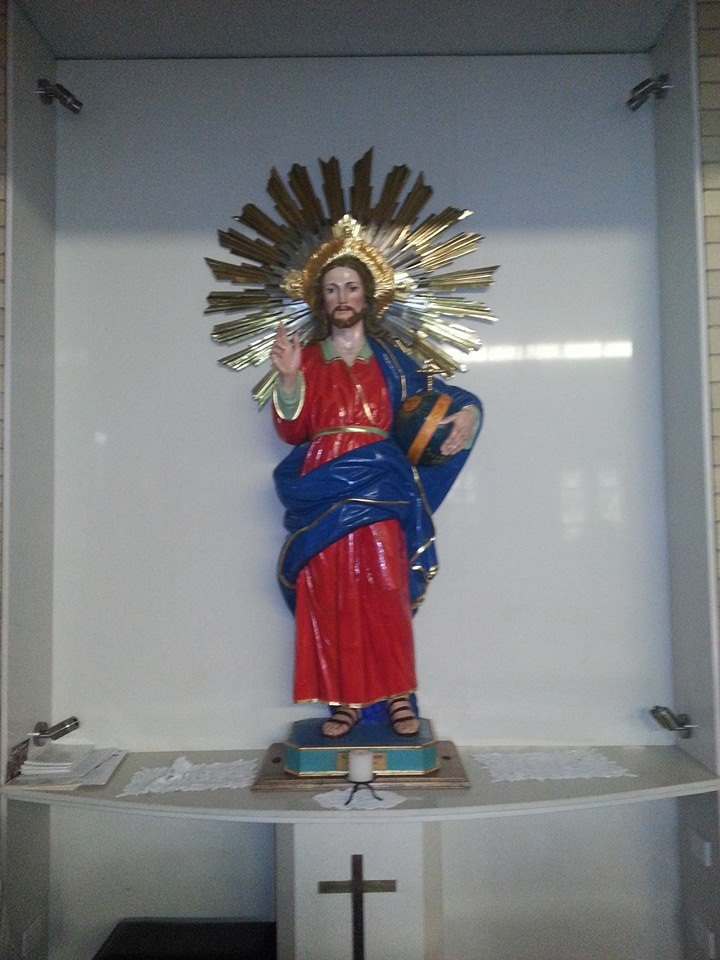
A statue in Narrawena, Sydney

The current wooden statue used in the celebration was created in 1797 by Serrese sculptor Vincenzo Scrivo, discovered thanks to a restoration made in the 1980s. In 2006, another little restoration was made, and that year the feast began at the border with Stilo at Via Nazionale.

Pazzano-Australian emigrants to Sydney (Australia) in Narrawena suburb celebrate Santissimo Salvatore with a similar statue of John the Apostle.

== Program ==
=== Friday ===
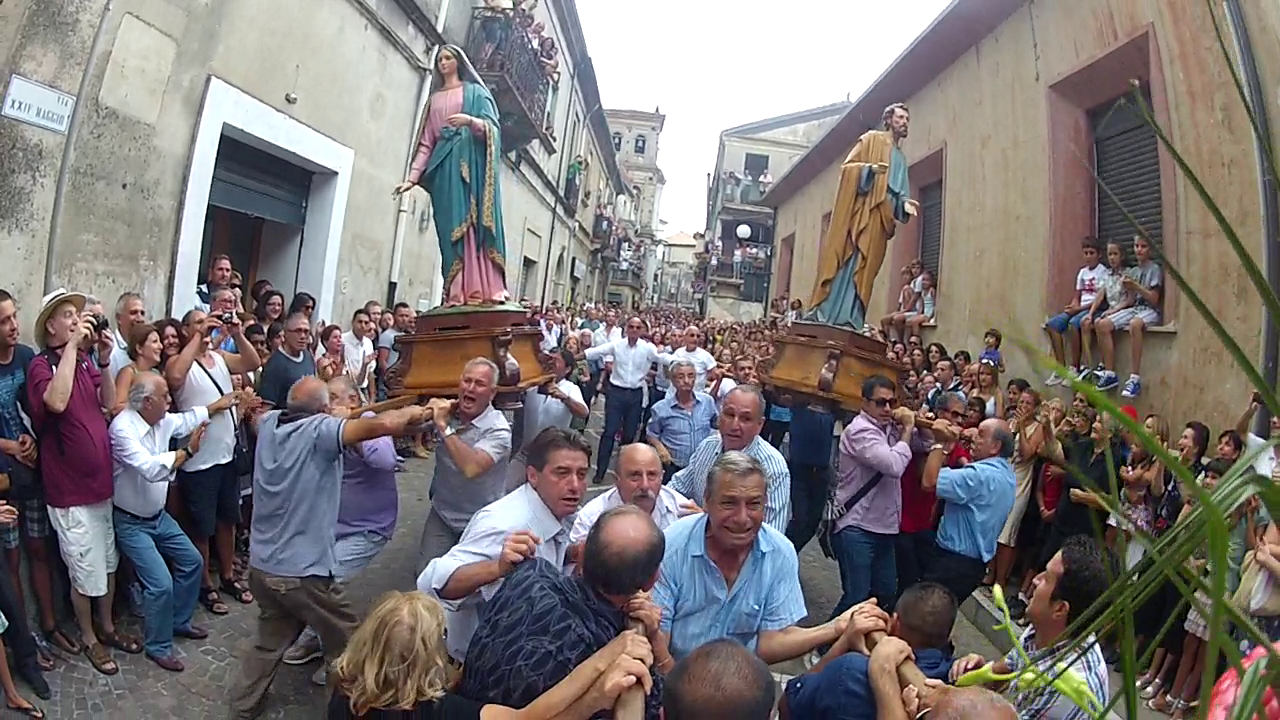
Cumoprunta on Sunday morning of Santissimo Salvatore in 2012

== Meaning ==
The religious procession relives three periods of Jesus' life.

- The first is the transfiguration of Christ upon Mount Tabor, symbolized by the path from the little chapel to the Calvary going through Parrera Street, whose name is of Greek origin, meaning: "steep climb".
- The second is the cumprunta or cunfrunti ("confrontation") of Sunday morning, when Saint Joseph and Mary meet Jesus coming back from the temple to learn from the masters.
- The third it is the cumprunta of Sunday afternoon, when Jesus greets his parents and begins his predication, symbolized by a circuitous route through the streets and alleys of the town.

== Litany ==
Litany played and sung at Pazzano

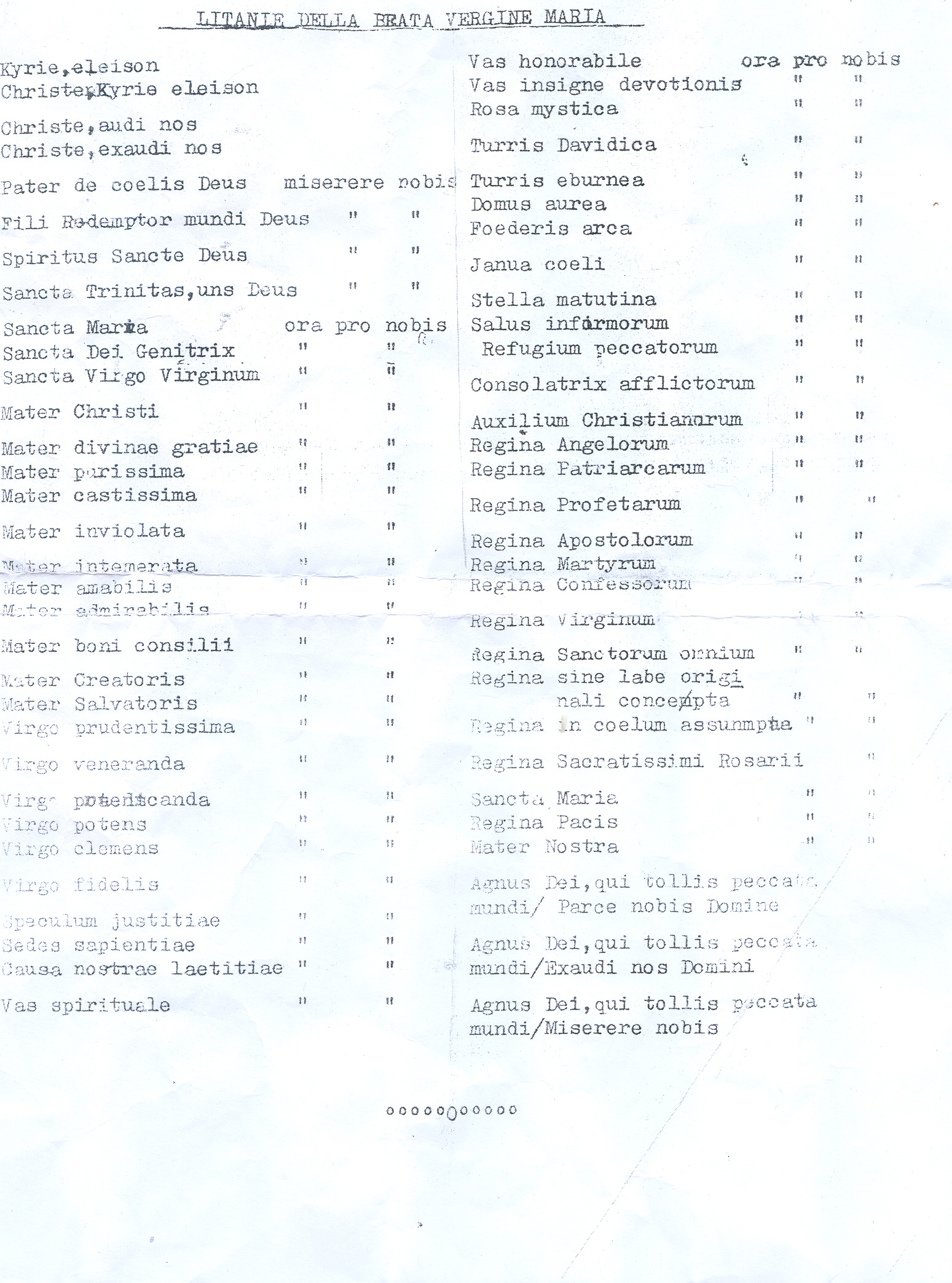
Full text of the litany

Below, a piece of the litany, sung in Latin and played by a band:

Kyrie, eleison

Christe, eleison
Kyrie, eleison

Christe, audi nos
Christe, exaudi nos

Pater de coelis, Deus, miserere nobis
Fili redemptor mundi, Deus, miserere nobis
Spiritus Sancte, Deus, miserere nobis
Sancta Trinitas, unus Deus, miserere nobis

Sancta Maria, ora pro nobis
Sancta Dei genitrix, ora pro nobis
Sancta Virgo virginum, ora pro nobis

Mater Christi, ora pro nobis
Mater Divinae Gratiae, ora pro nobis
Mater purissima, ora pro nobis
Mater castissima, ora pro nobis
Mater inviolata, ora pro nobis
Mater intemerata, ora pro nobis
Mater amabilis, ora pro nobis
Mater admirabilis, ora pro nobis

...

== Works ==
The documentary Festa, by Giuseppe Fiorenza, tells and describes the feast of 1992.

== Gallery ==
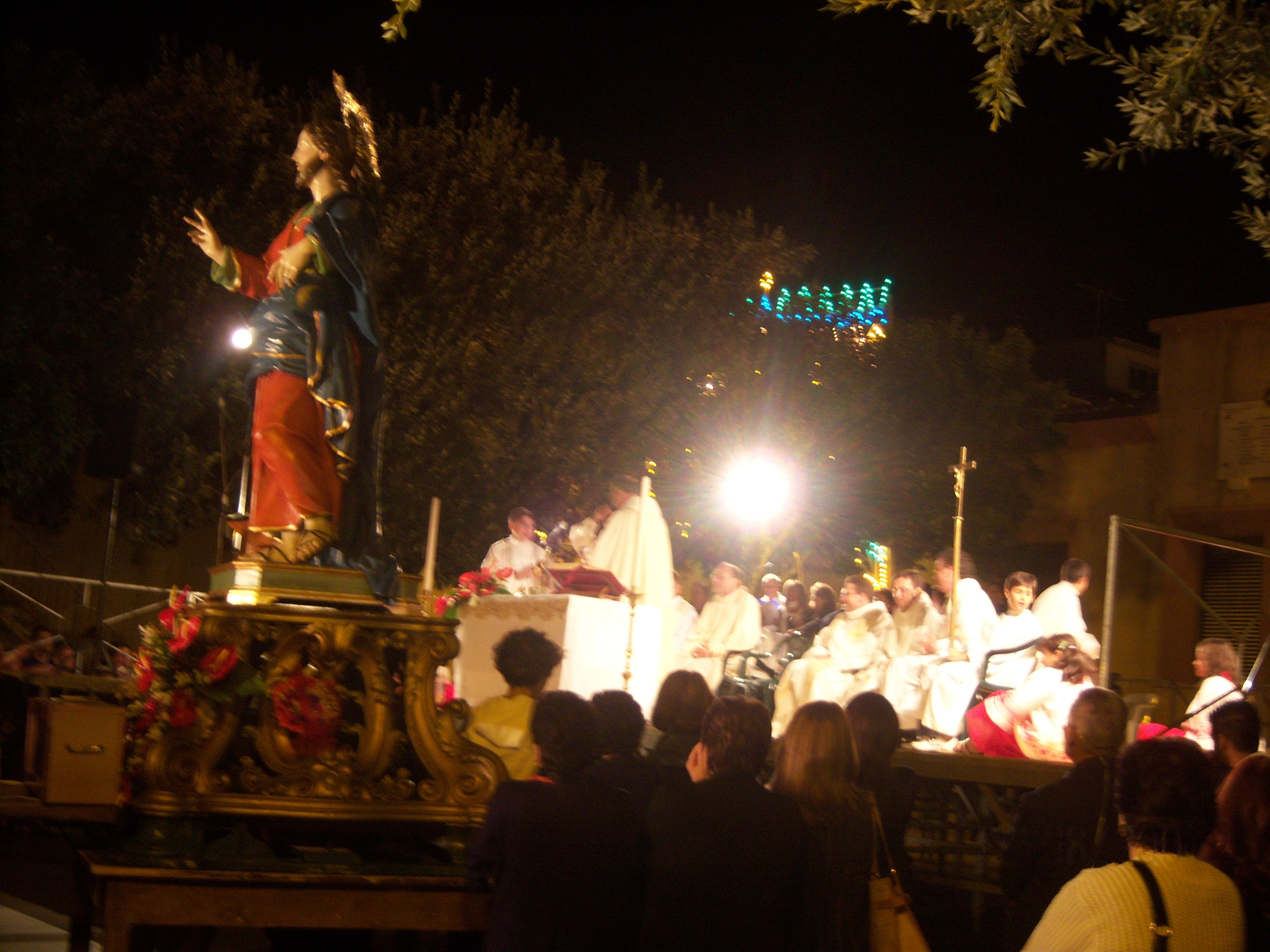
Mass celebration

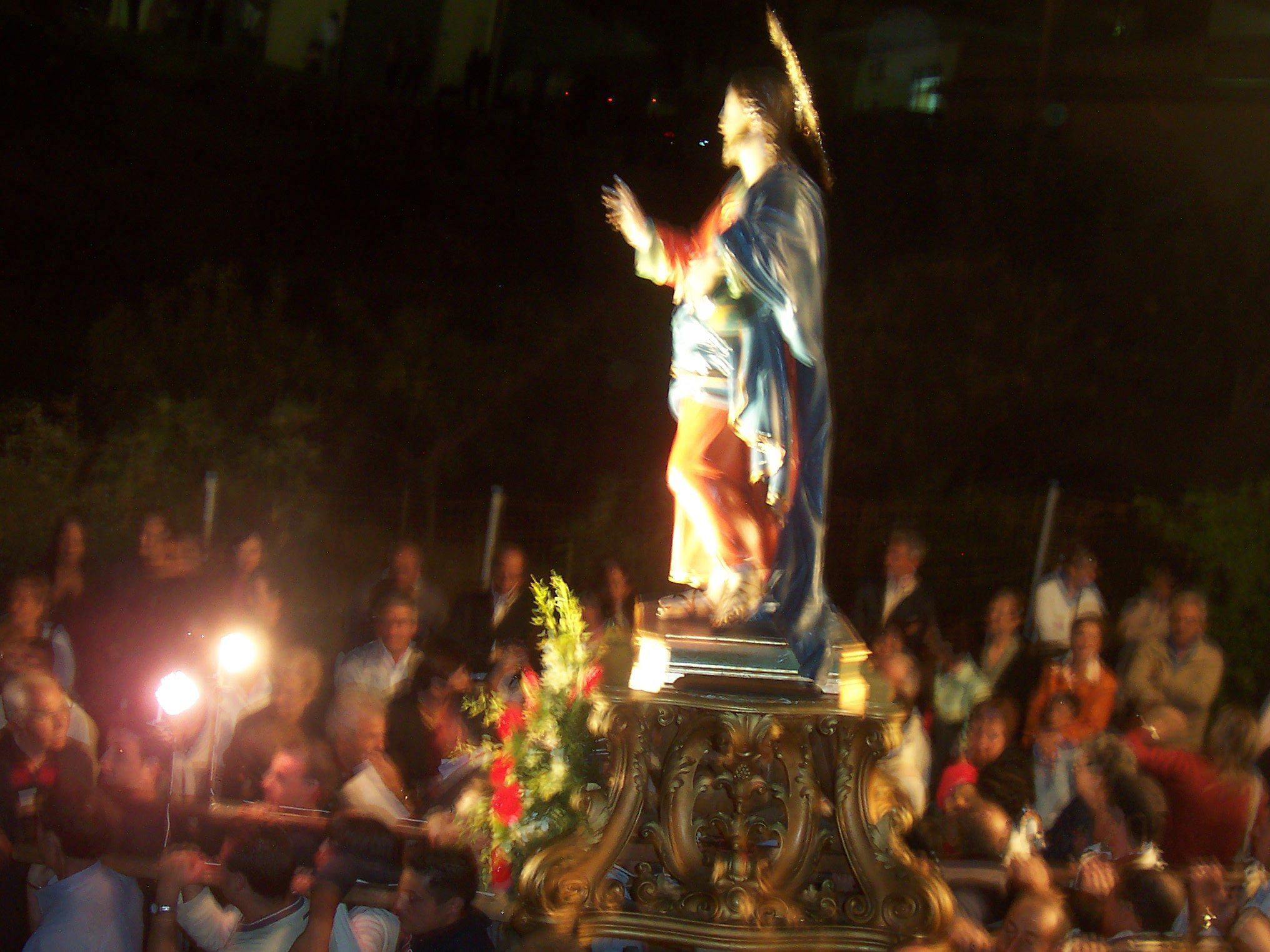
Night procession to the Chapel

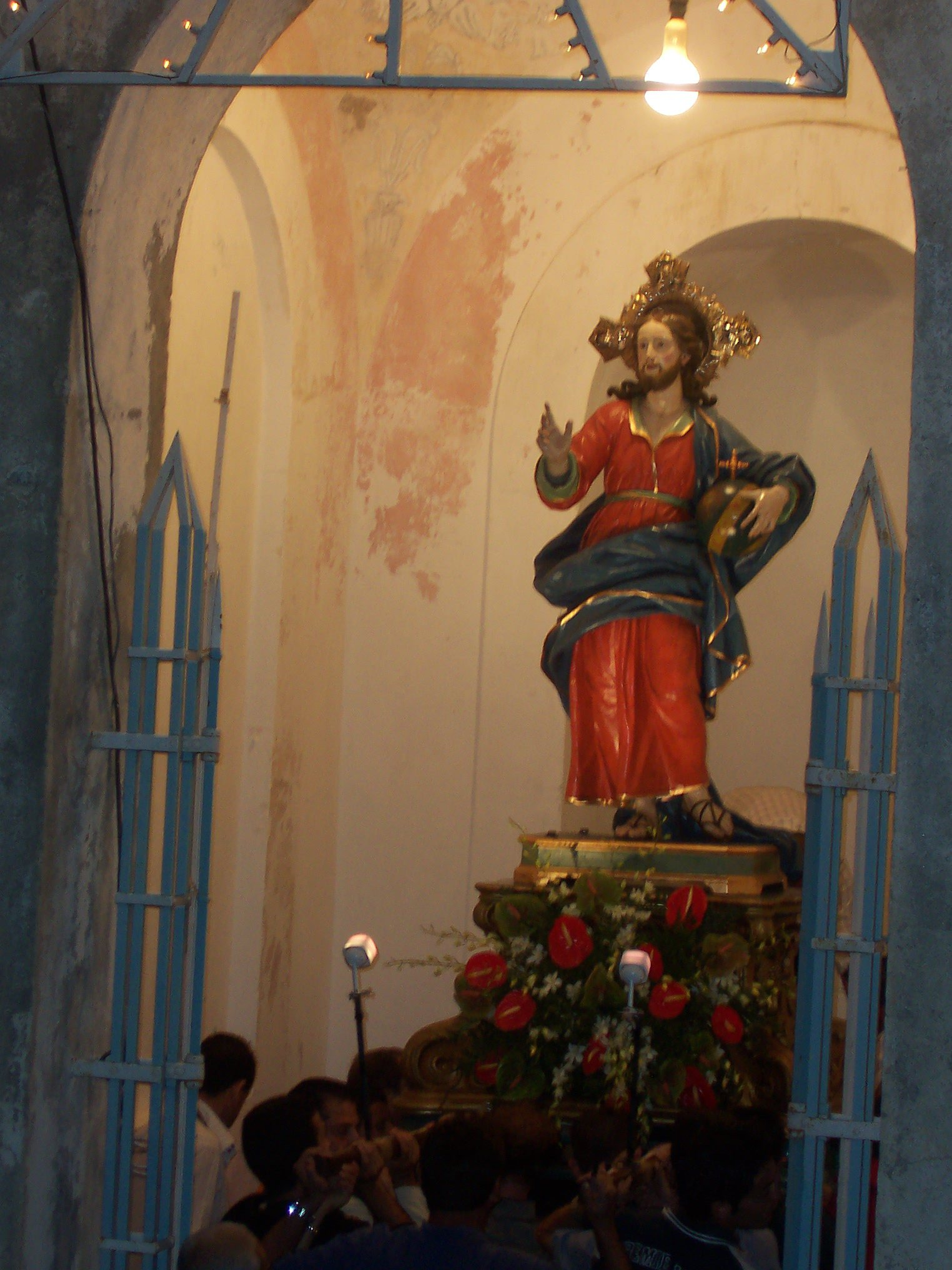
Statue taken to the chapel

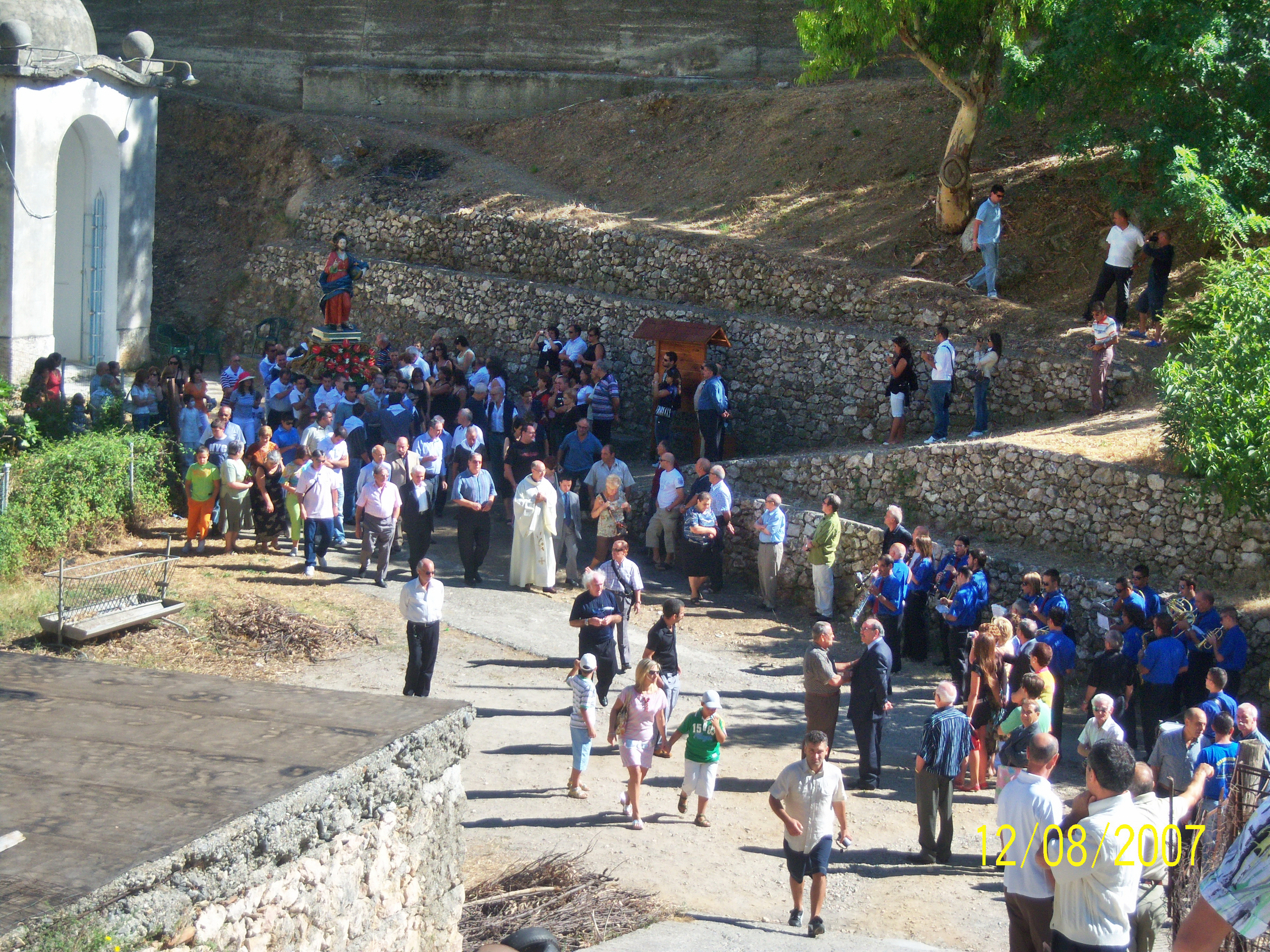
Salvatore at the chapel on Sunday morning

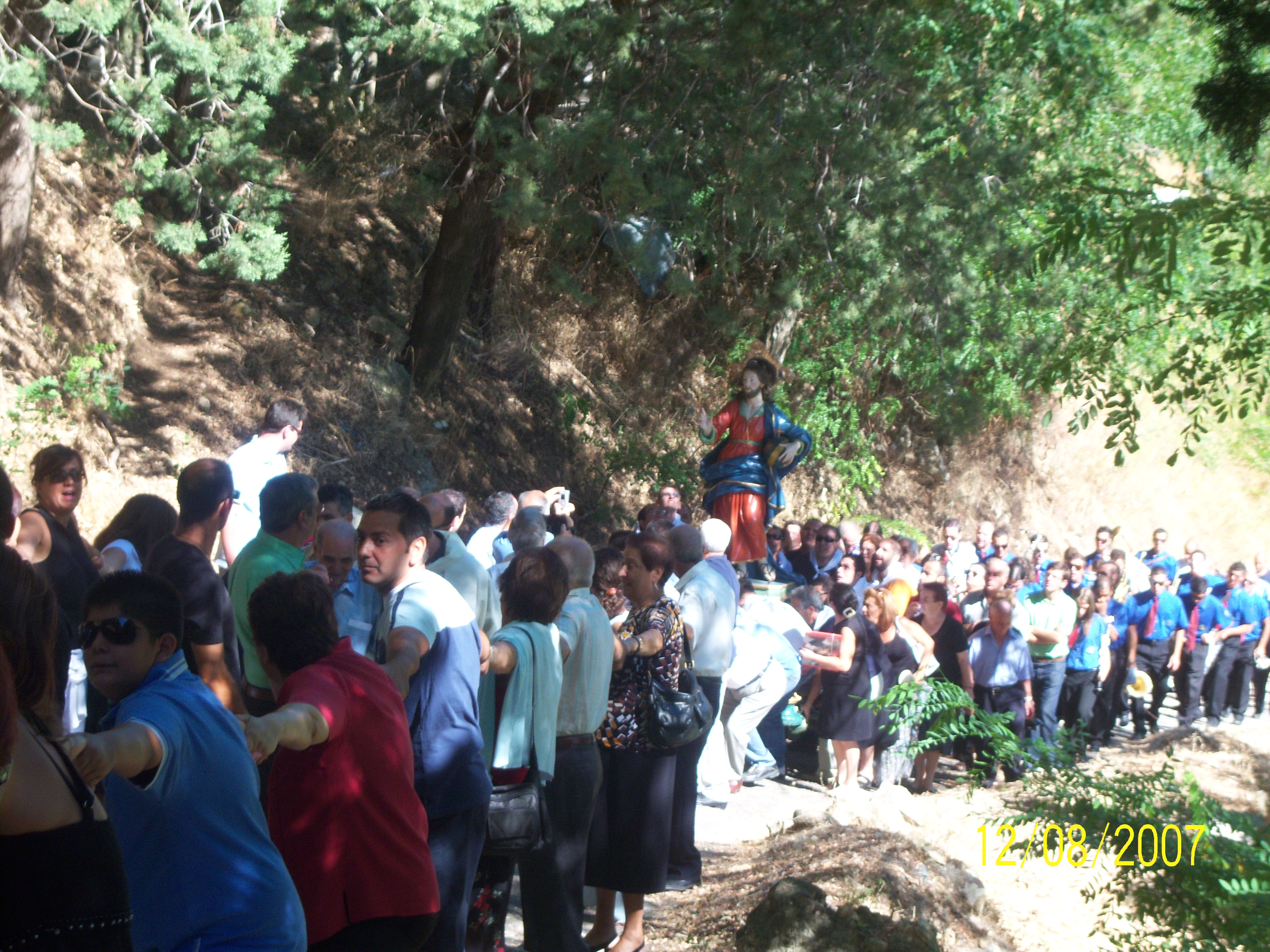
Santo Salvatore in Parrera Street

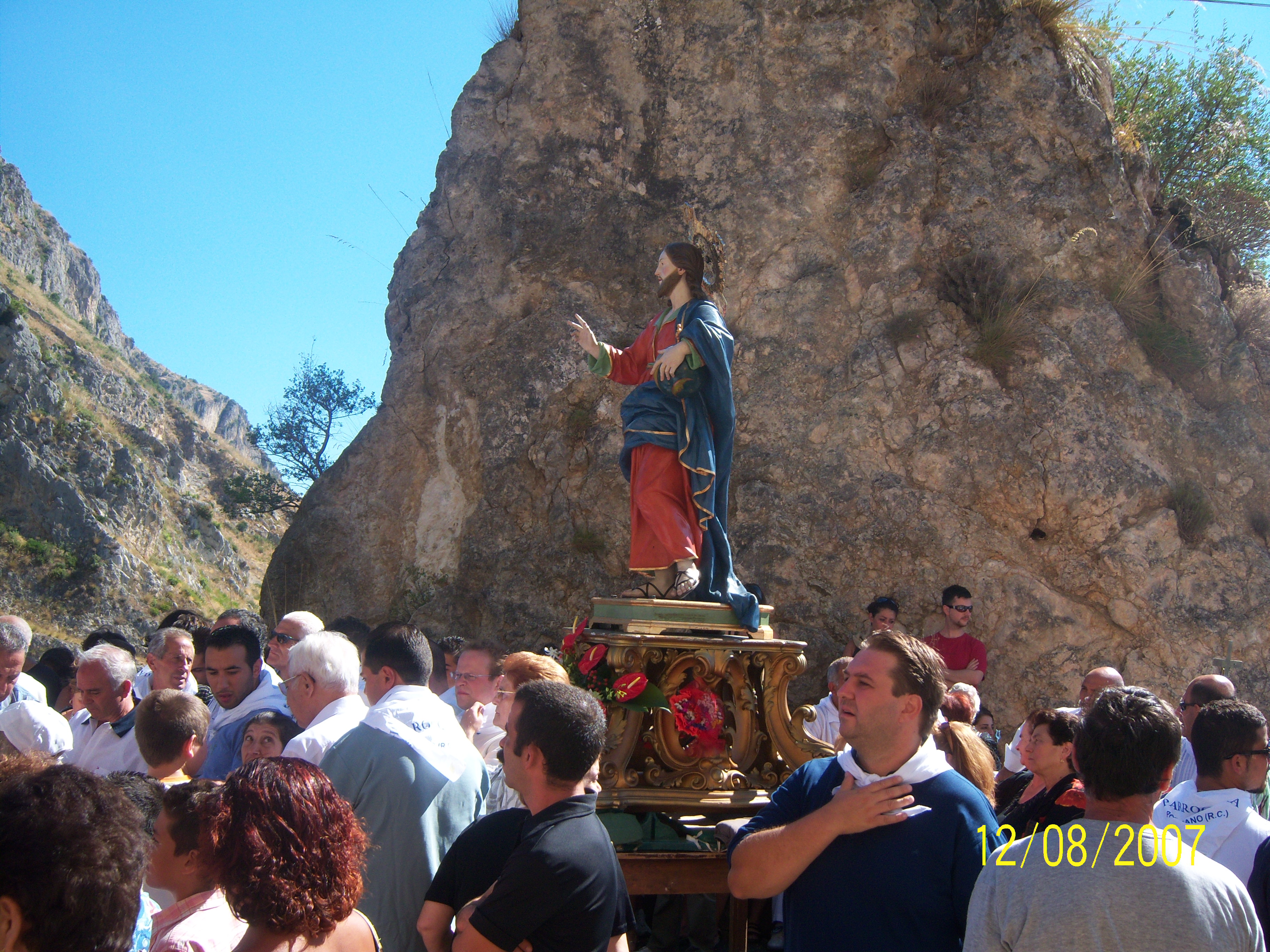
Salvatore at the calvary

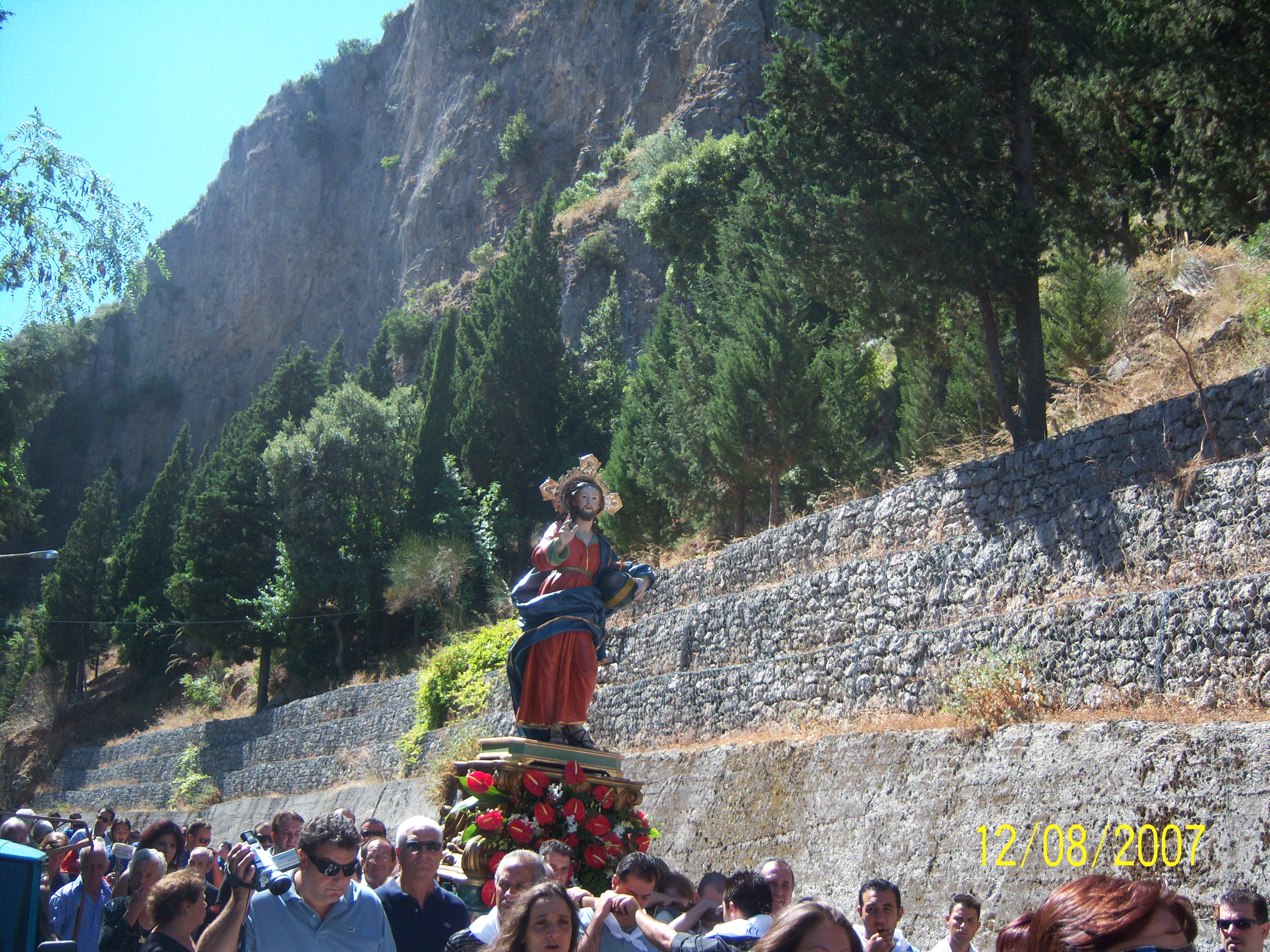
Santo Salvatore in procession

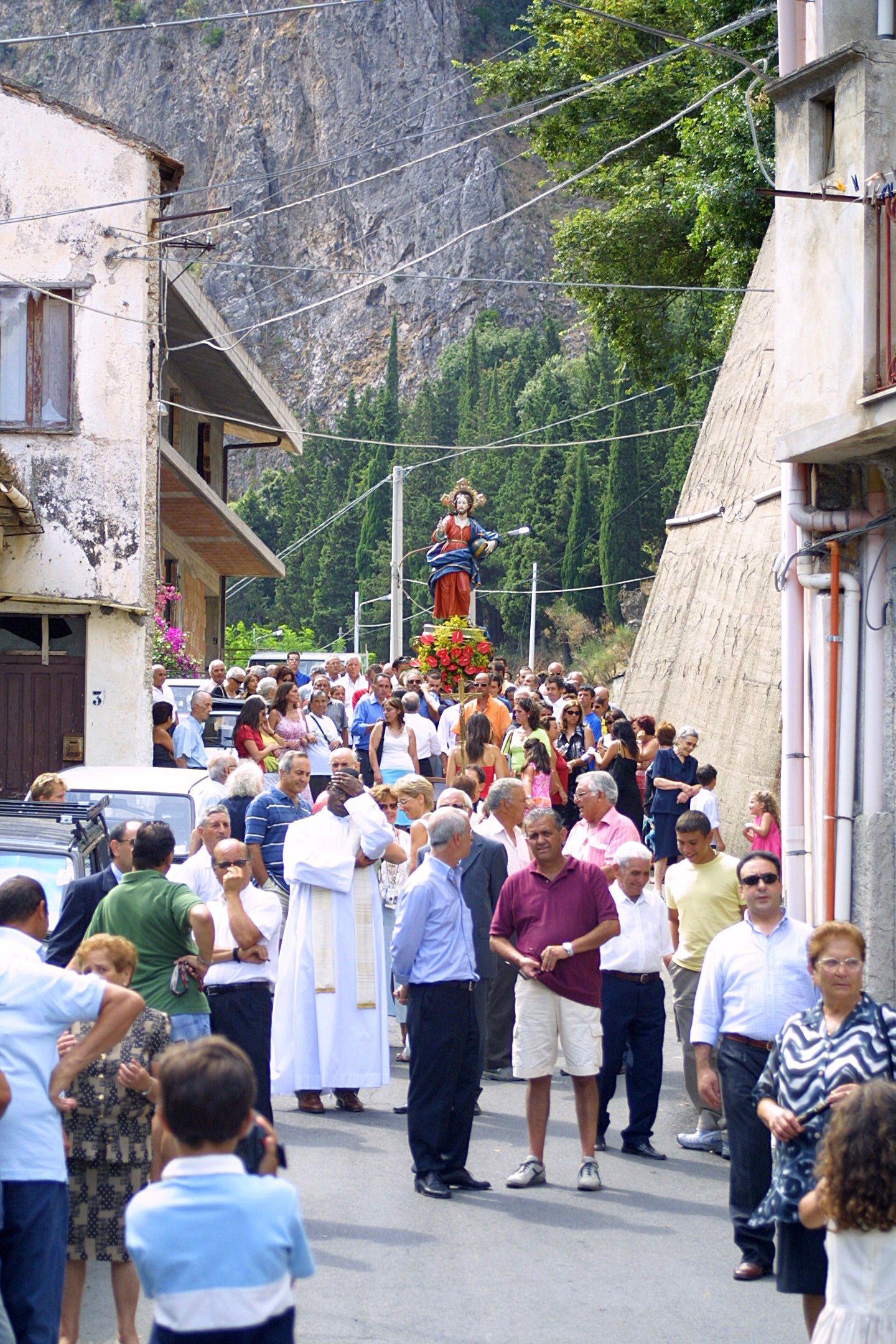
Santo in the town streets

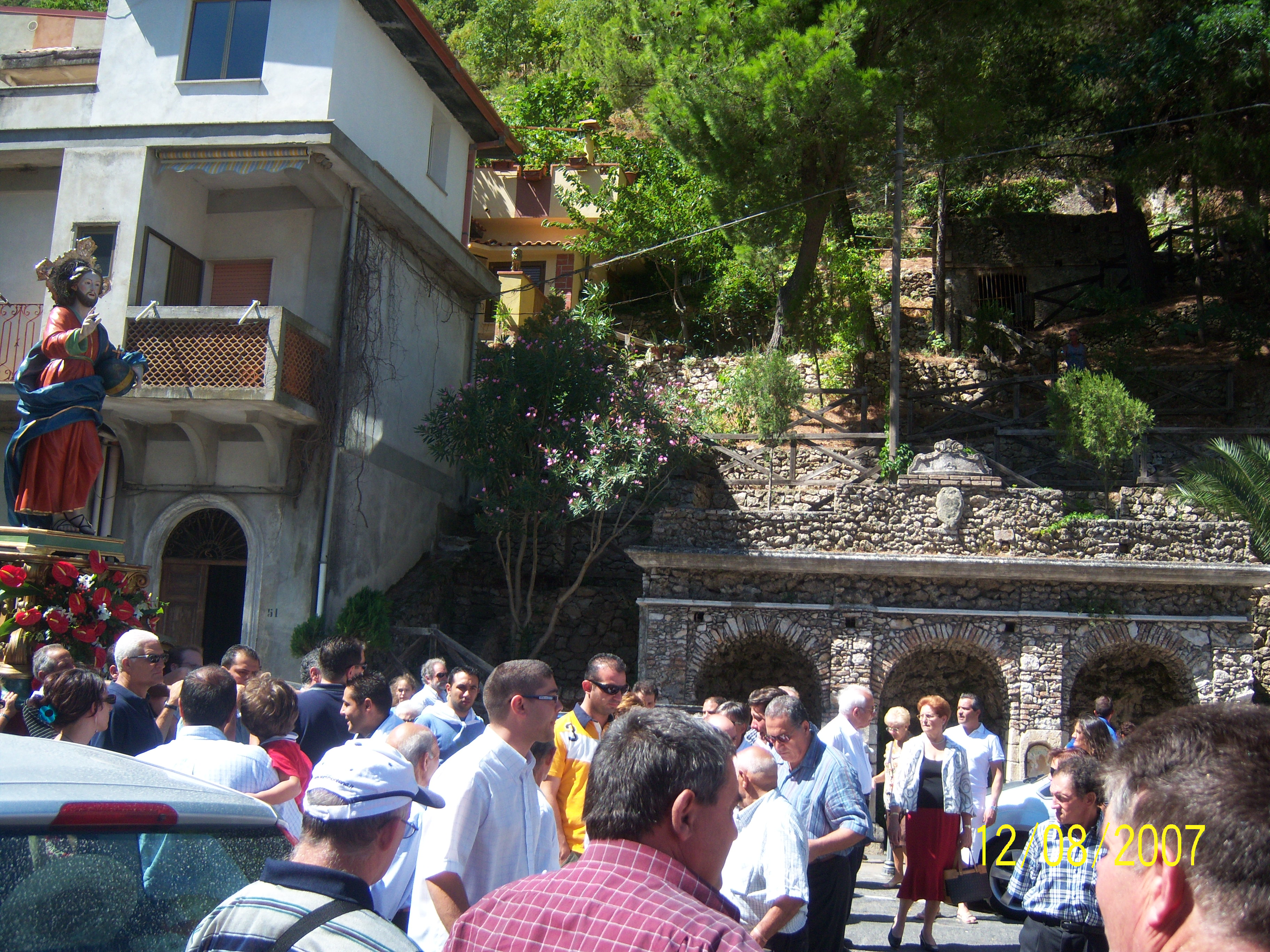
Santo Salvatore at the Old Fountain

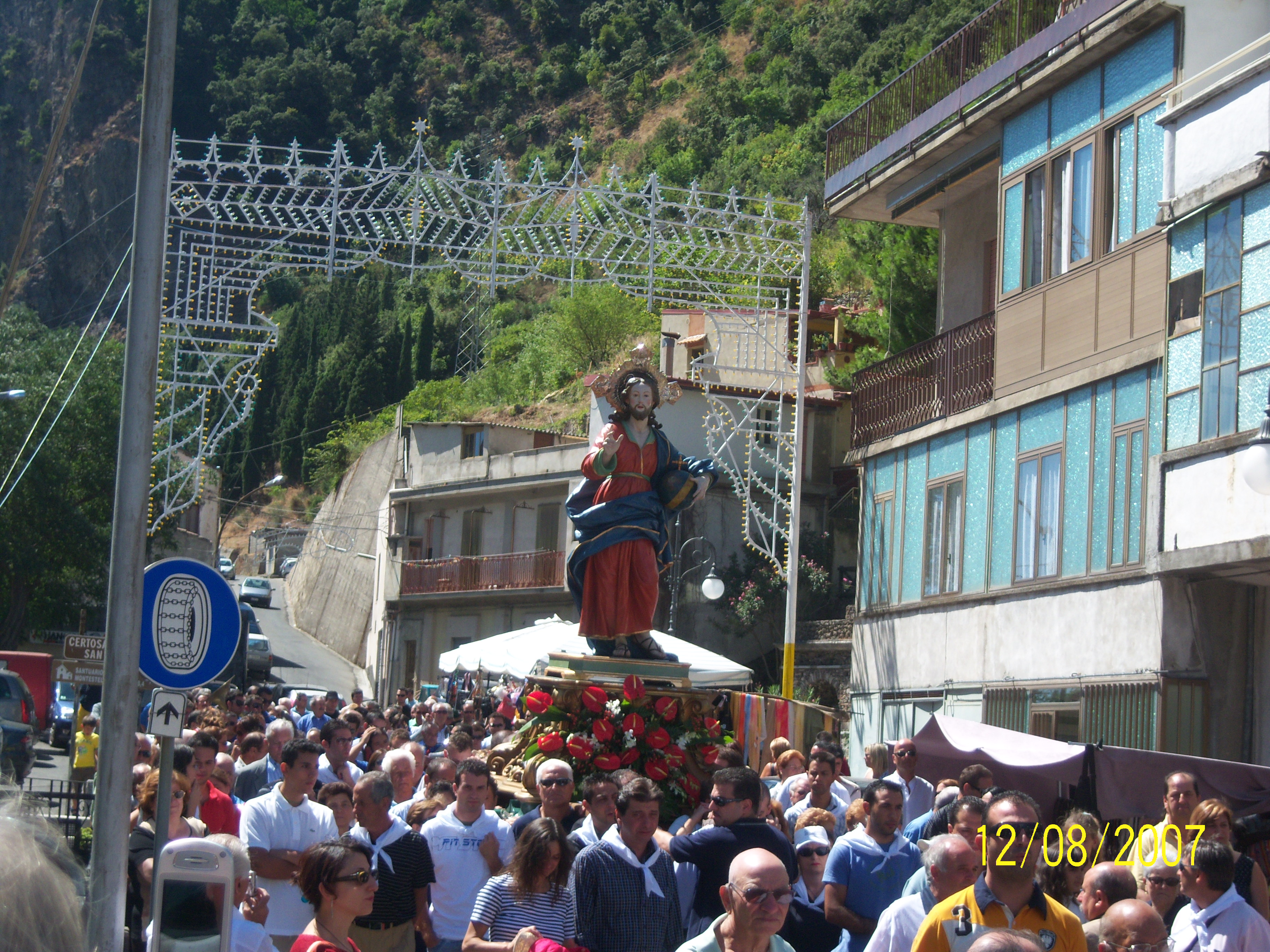
Santo Salvatore near IV Novembre Square

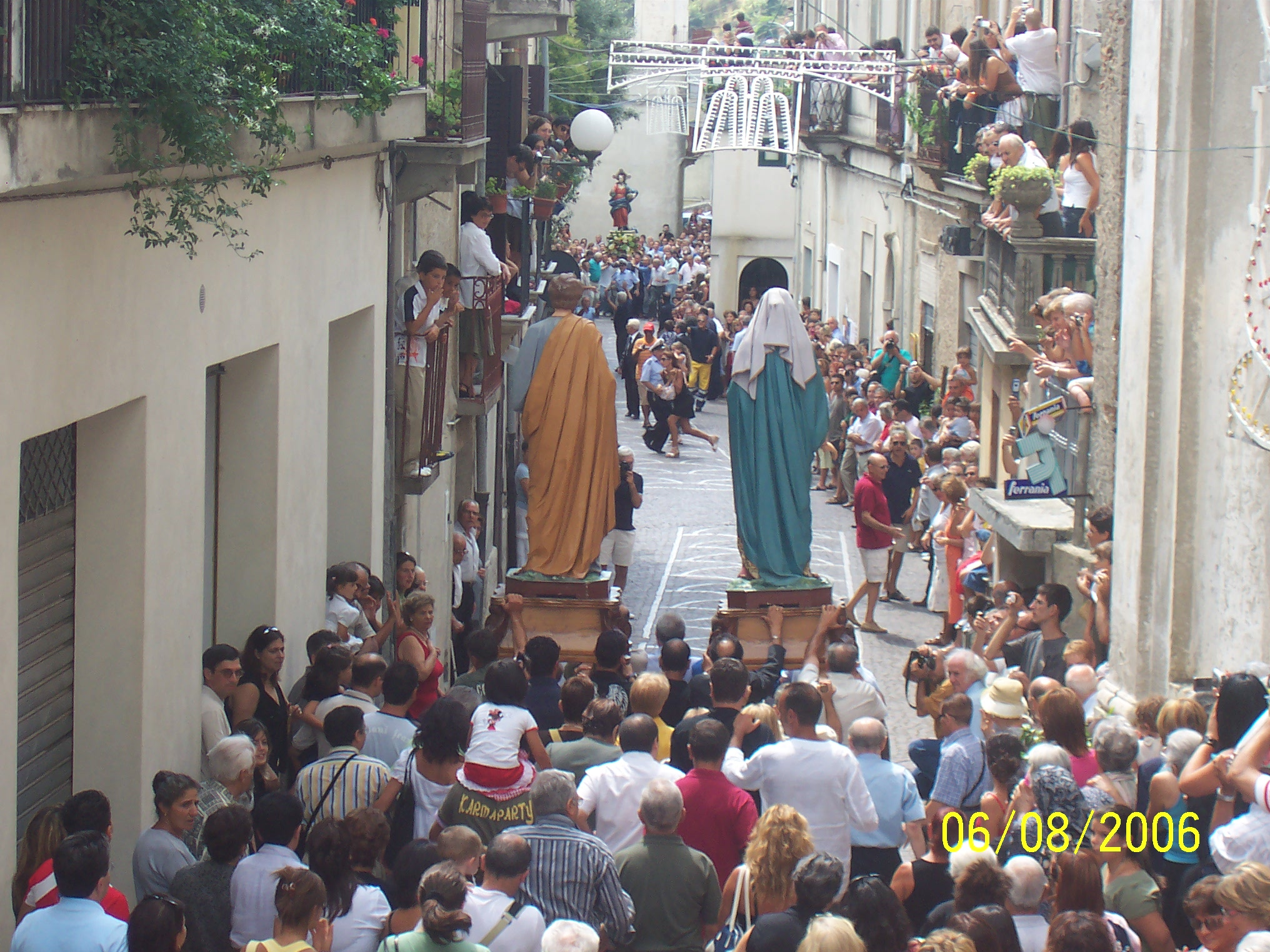
Cunfrunti 1

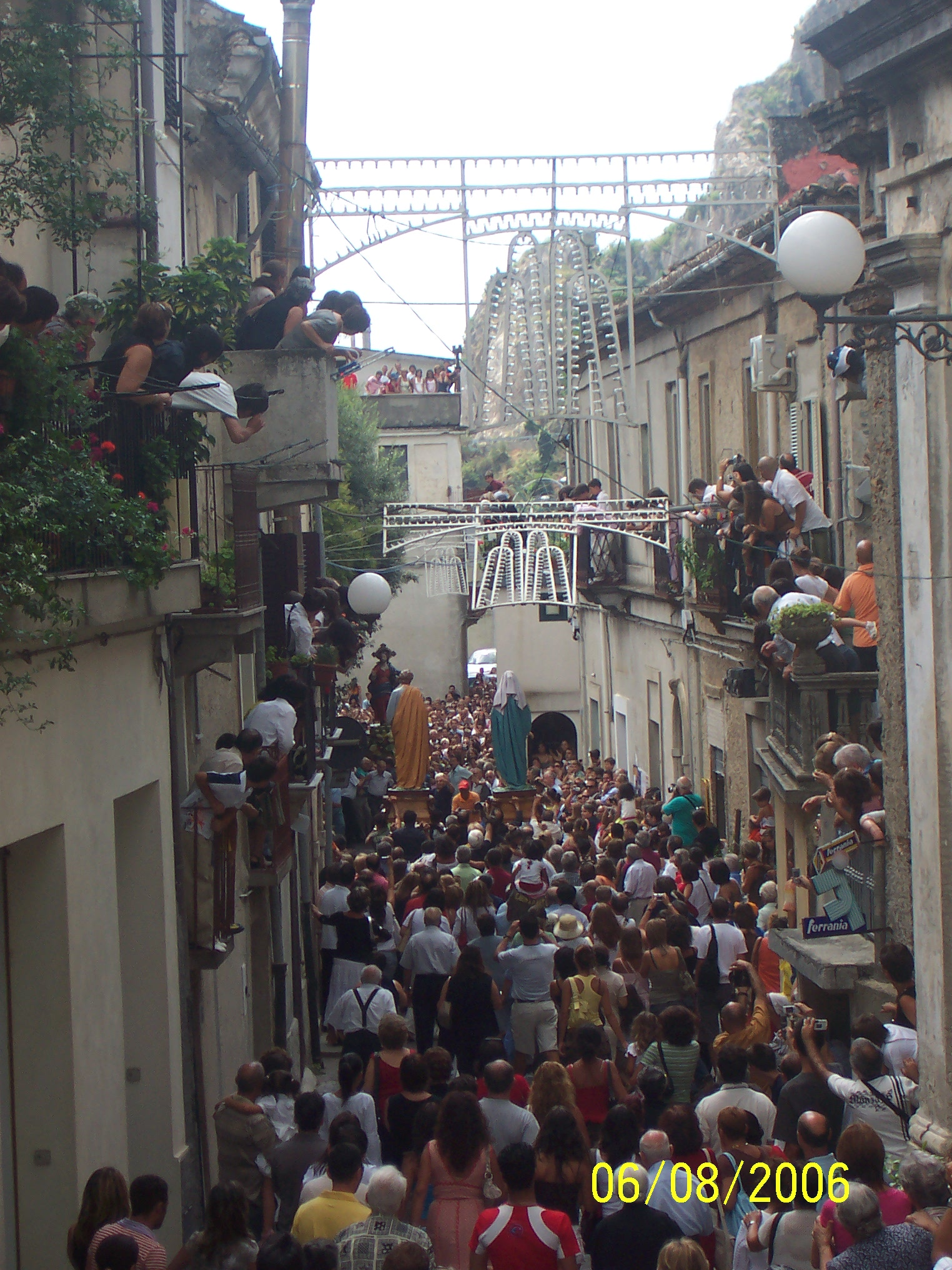
Cunfrunti 2

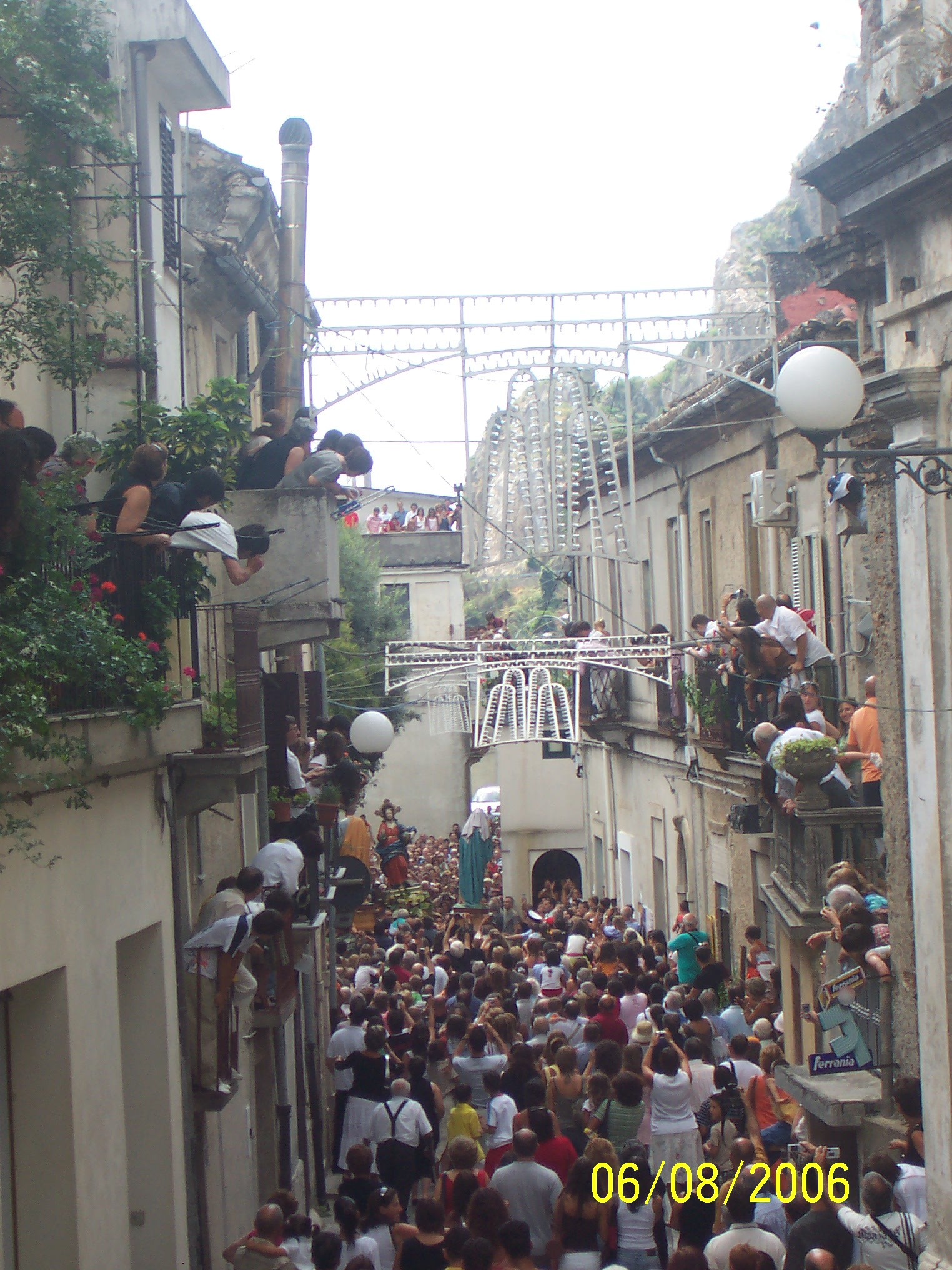
Cunfrunti 3

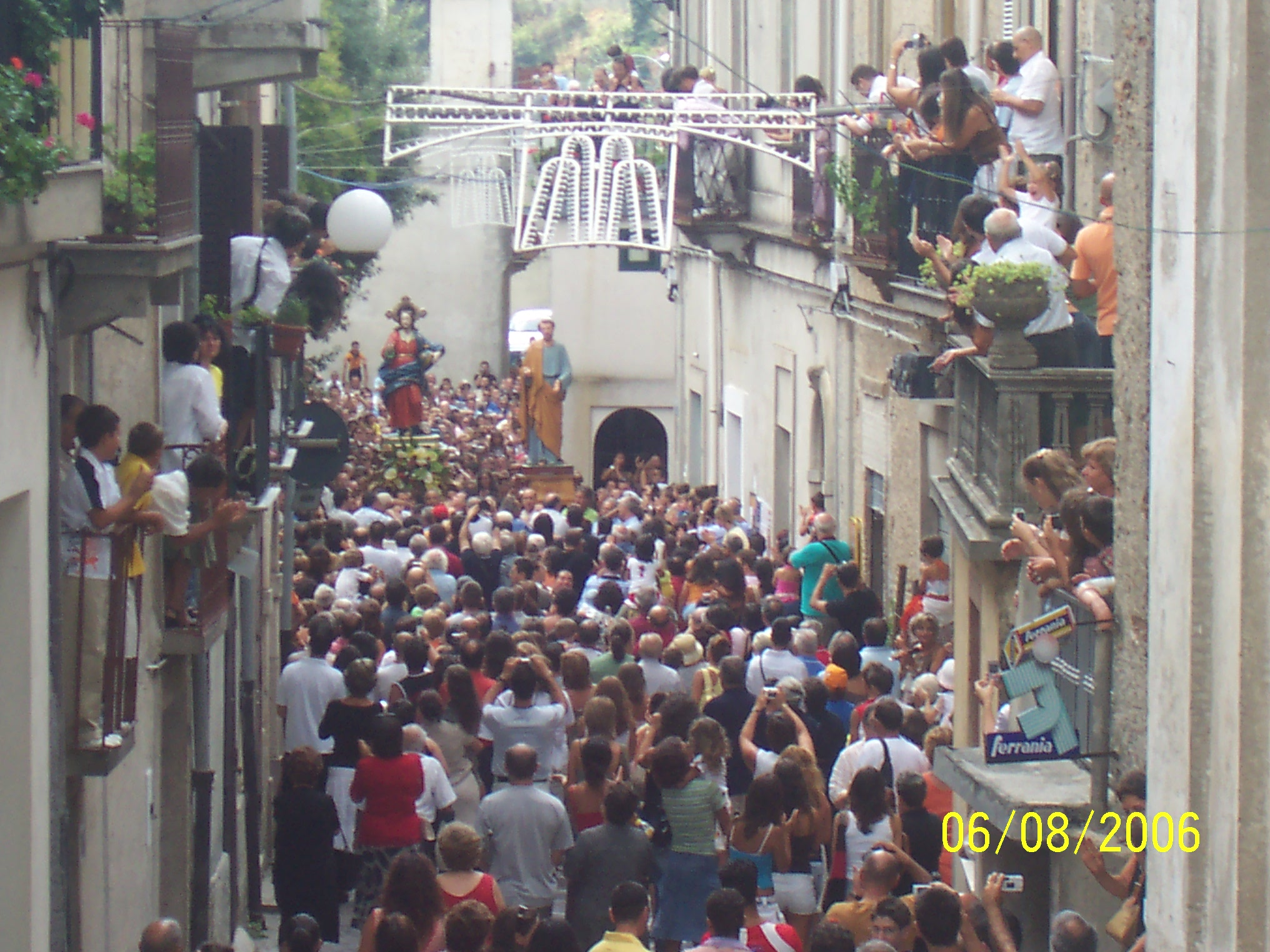
Cunfrunti 4

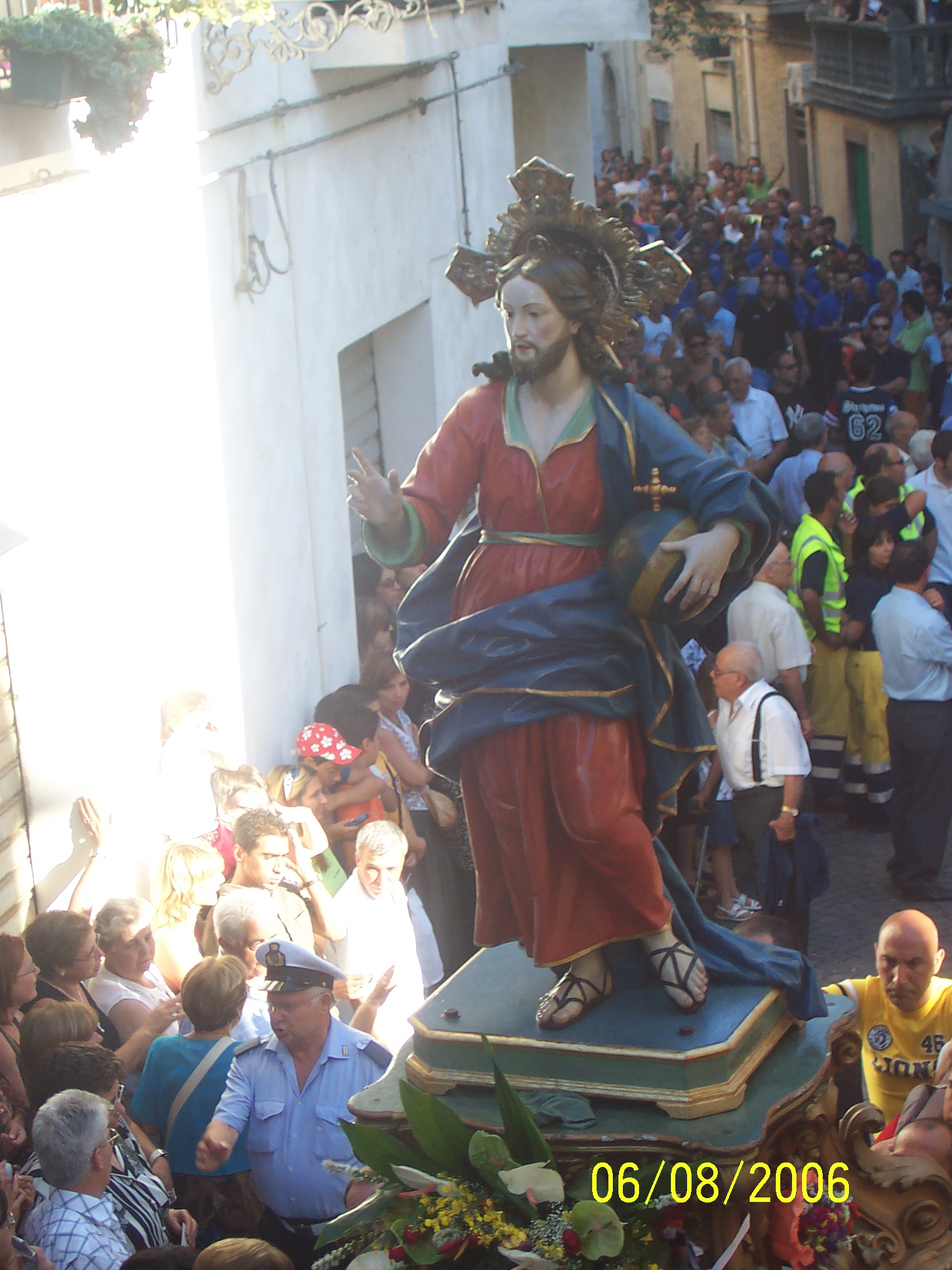

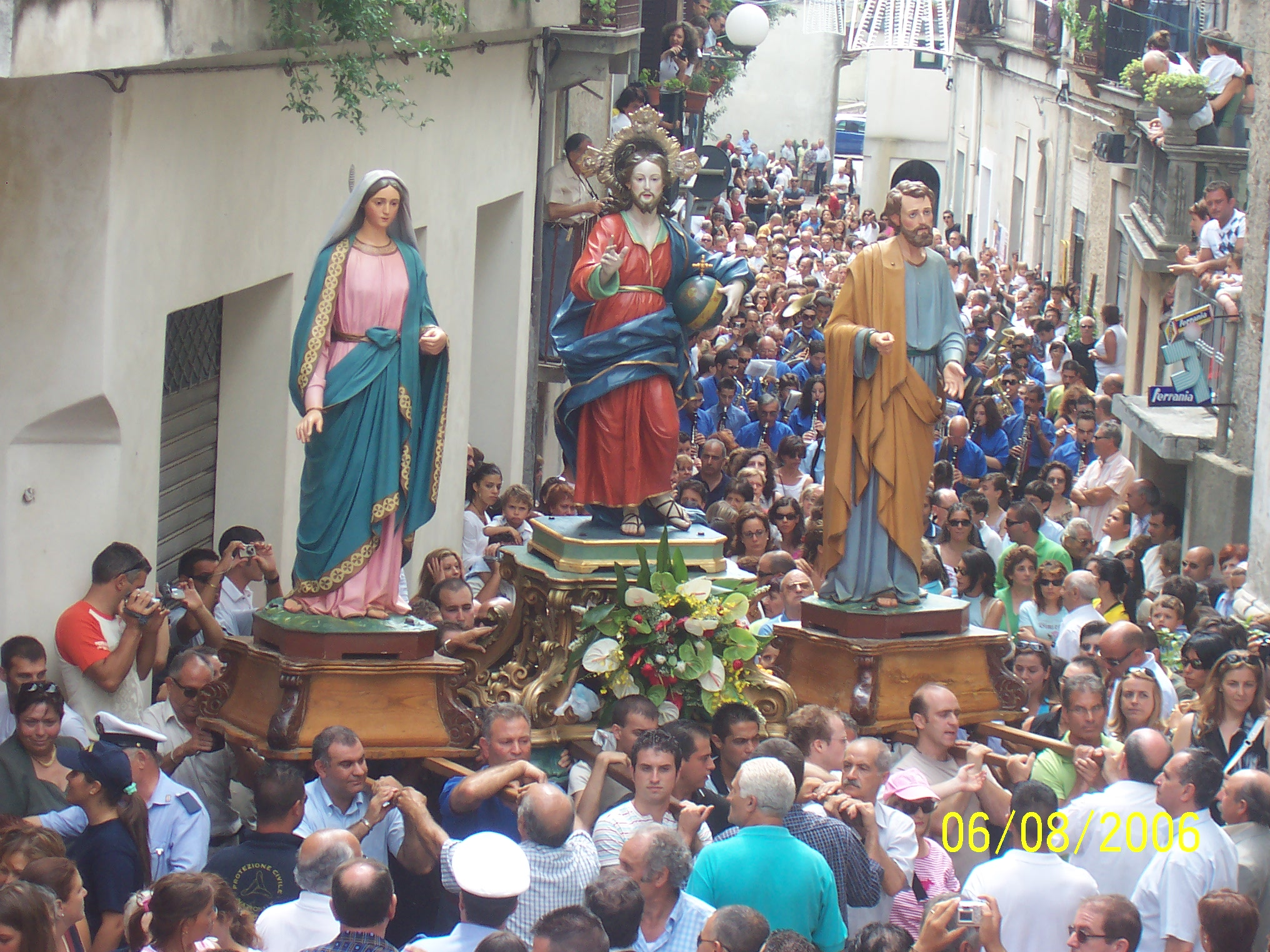
Getting back in the church

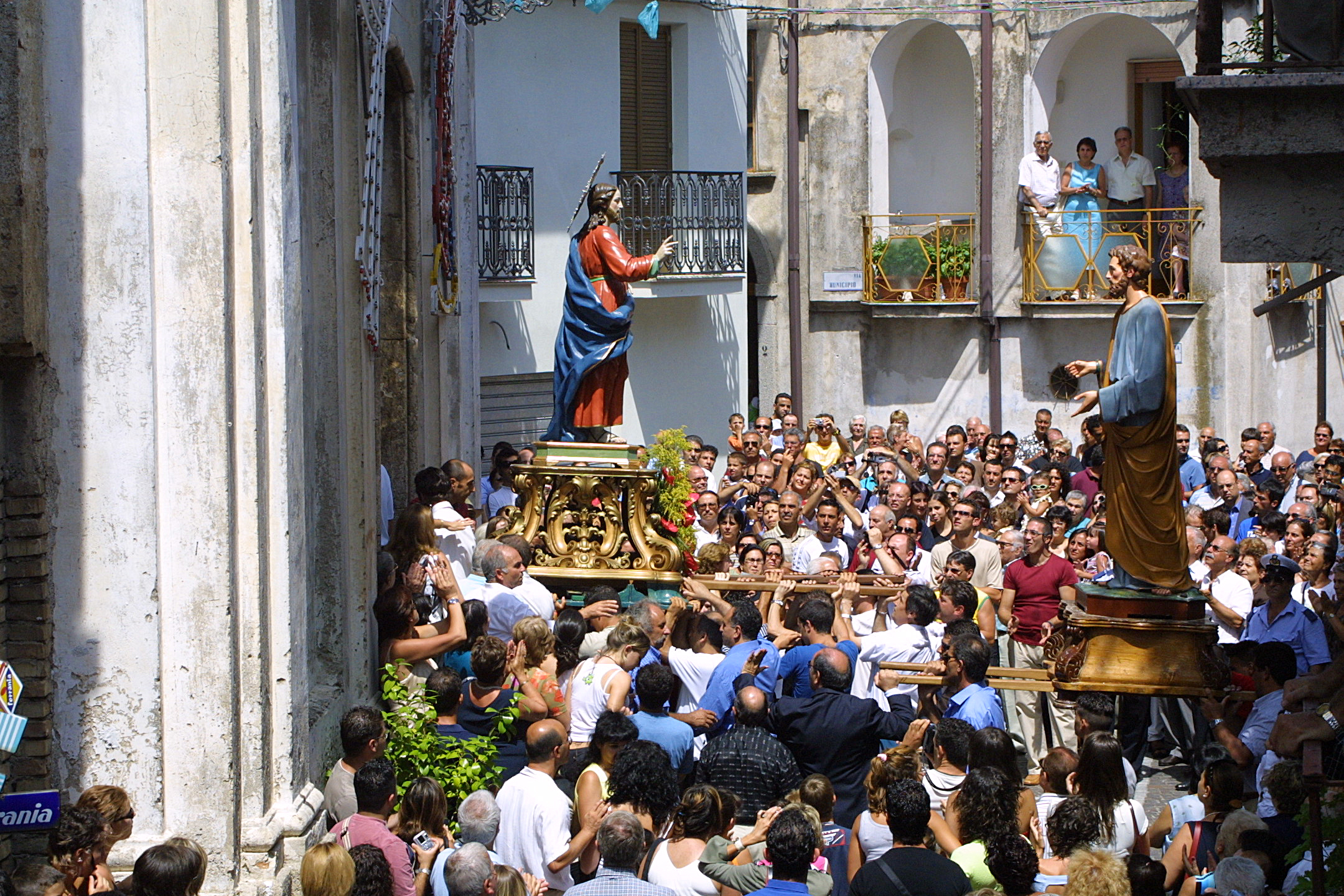

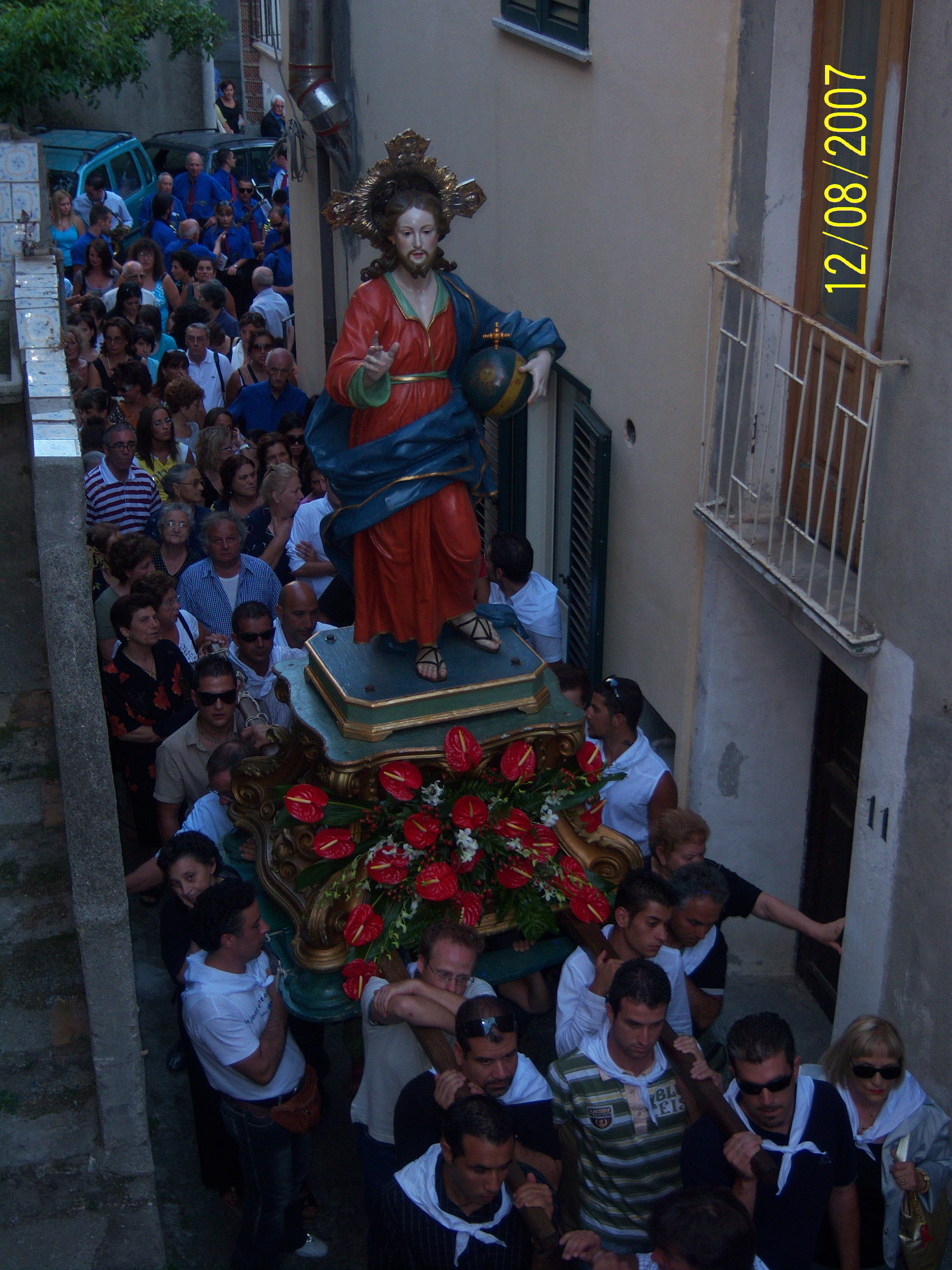
Statue in the alleys

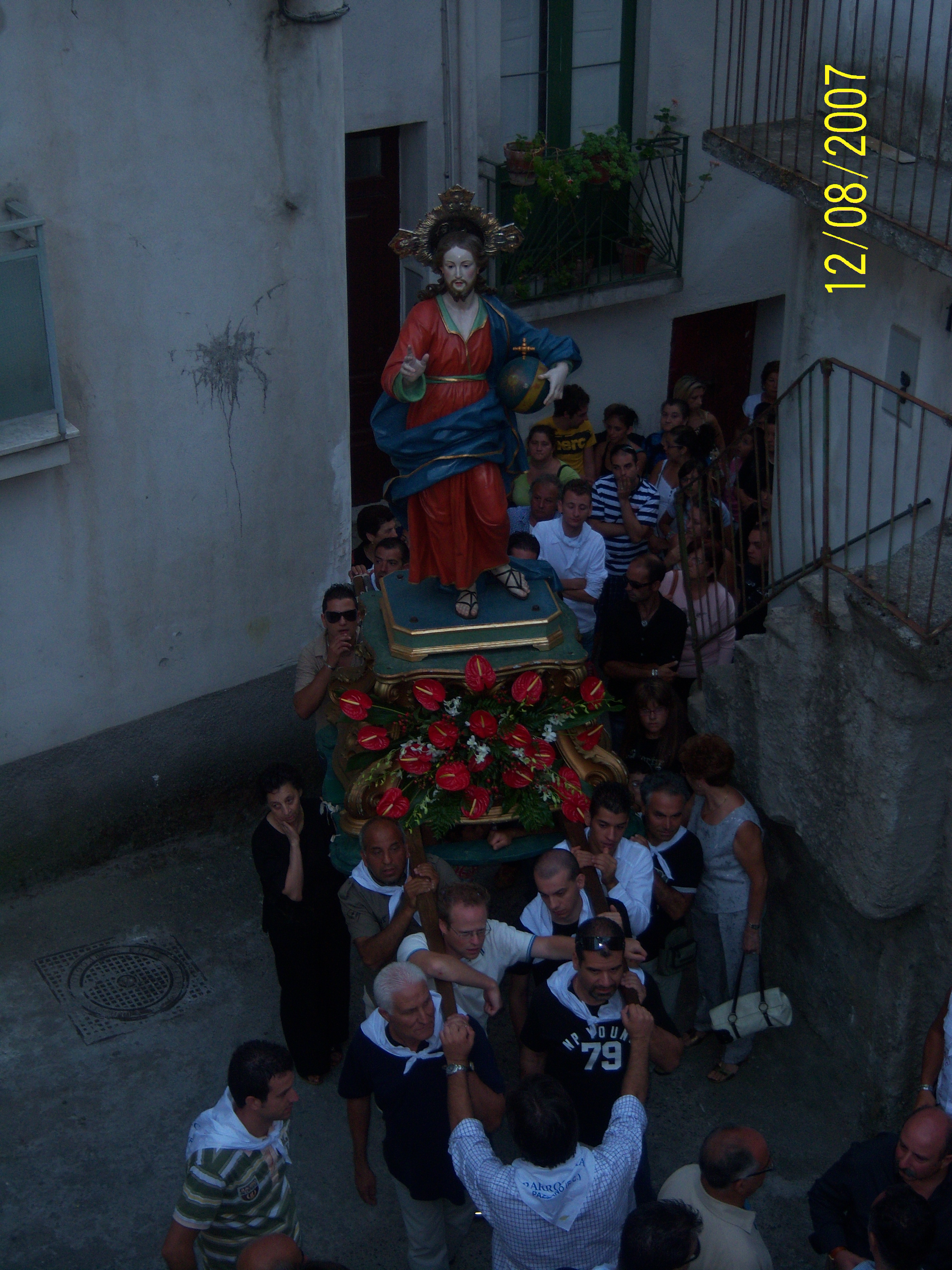
Statue in the alleys 2

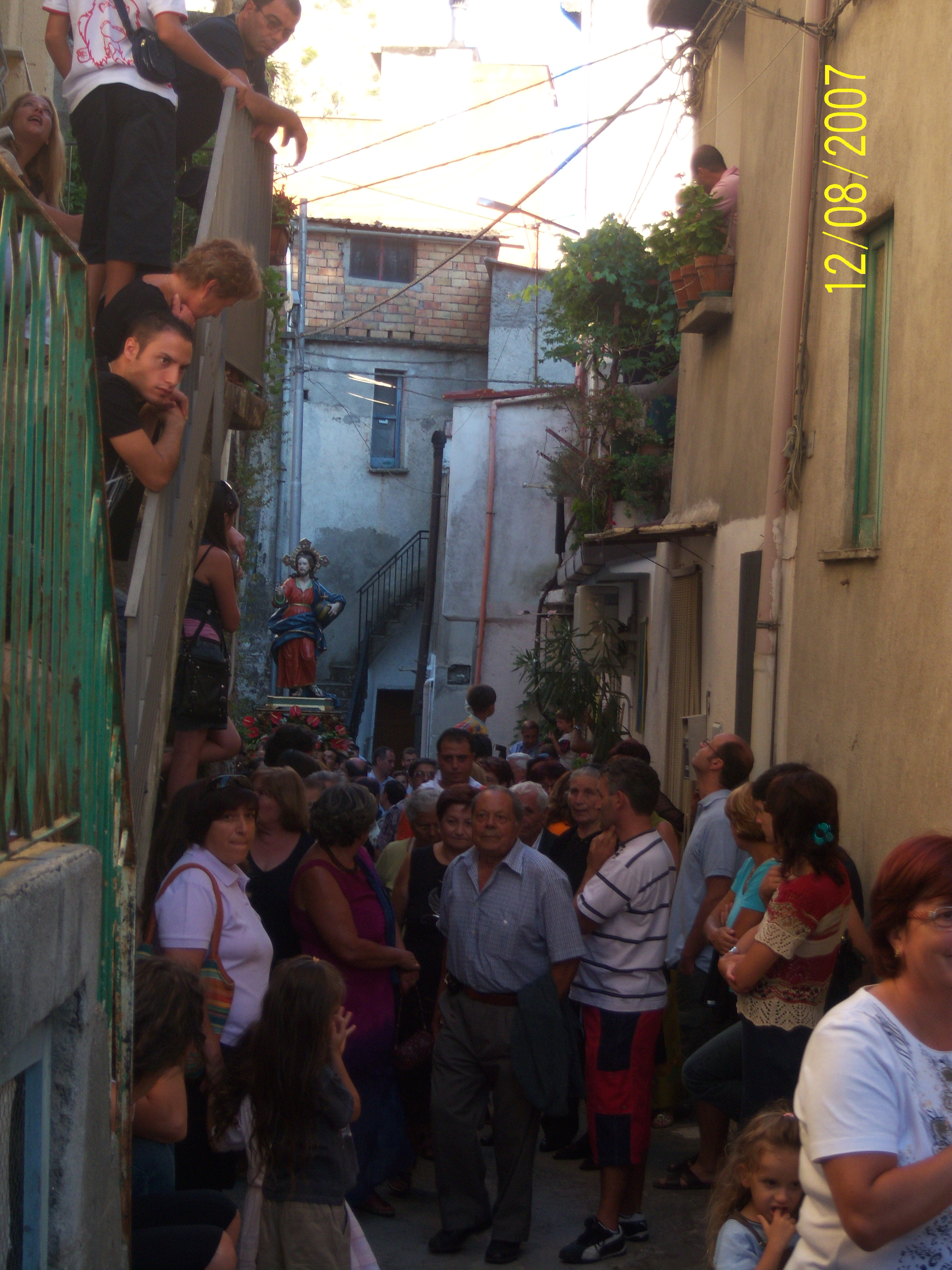
Statue in the alleys 3

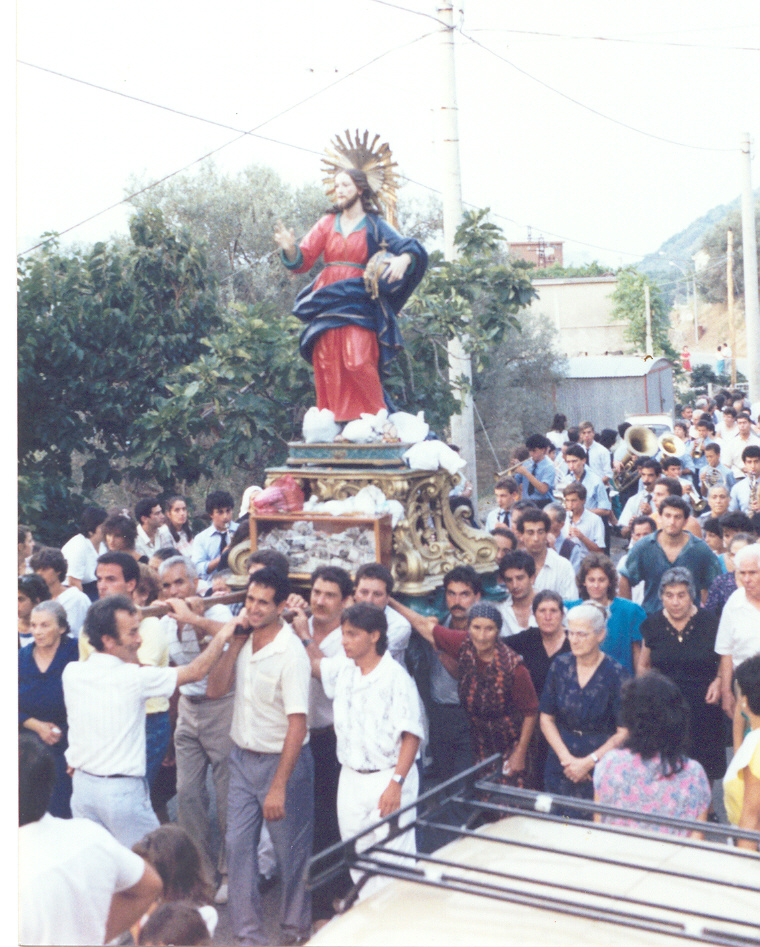
Statue in the alleys 4

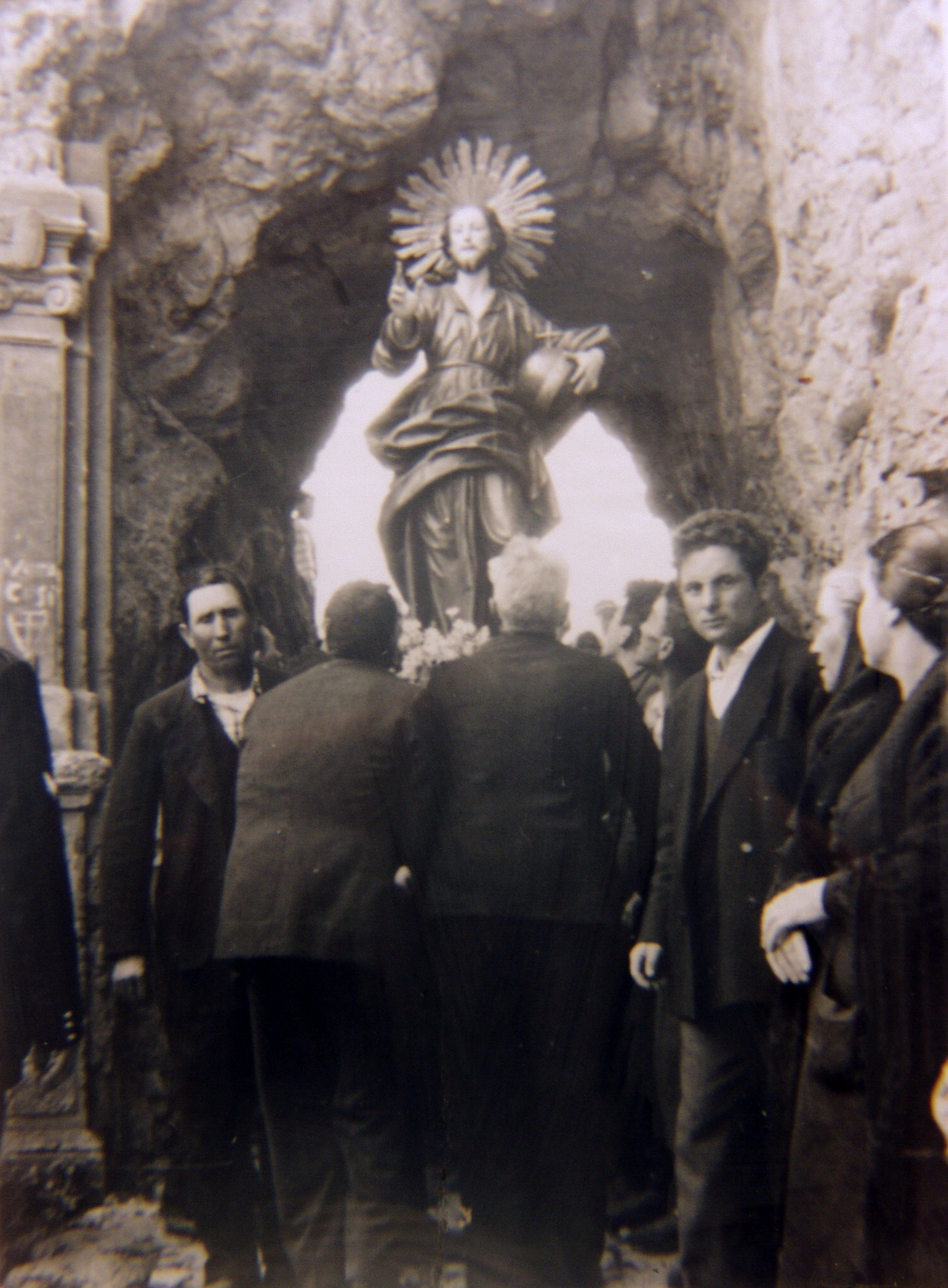
Santo Salvatore at the calvary

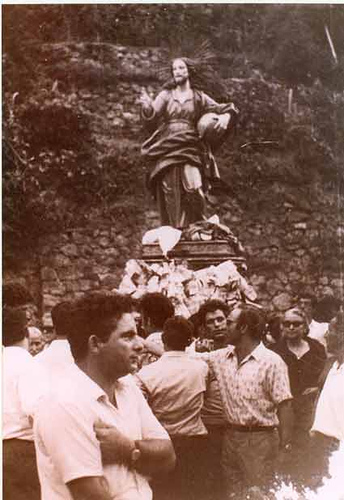
Festa del Santo Salvatore in the 1950s

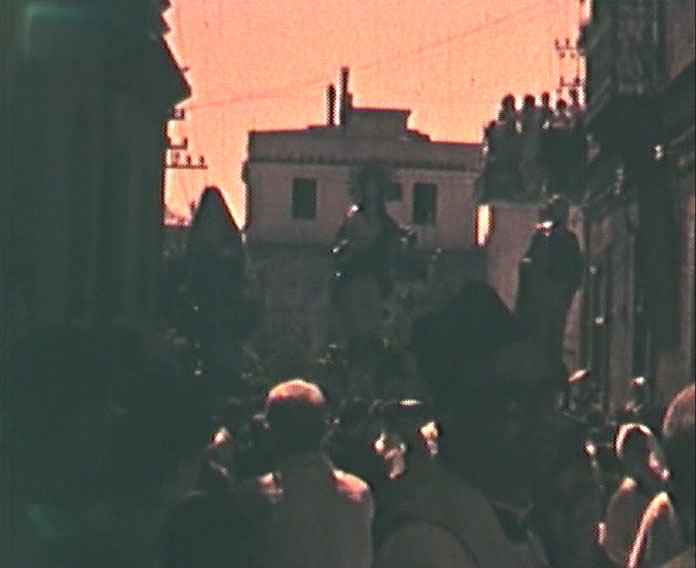
Santo Salvatore feast of 1965

== Videos ==
Festa del Santo Salvatore begins (1994)

Festa del Santo Salvatore - Night, going to the chapel (1994)

Parrera street(2007)

Cunfrunti of Sunday morning (1994)

Vow to the saint (1994)

Coming back to the church of Santa Maria Assunta in Cielo (1994)

Procession among the alleys (2007)

Feast among the alleys (2007)

== See also ==
- Pazzano
