= Archaeological site of Mount Bonifato =

Archaeological site in Alcamo, Italy

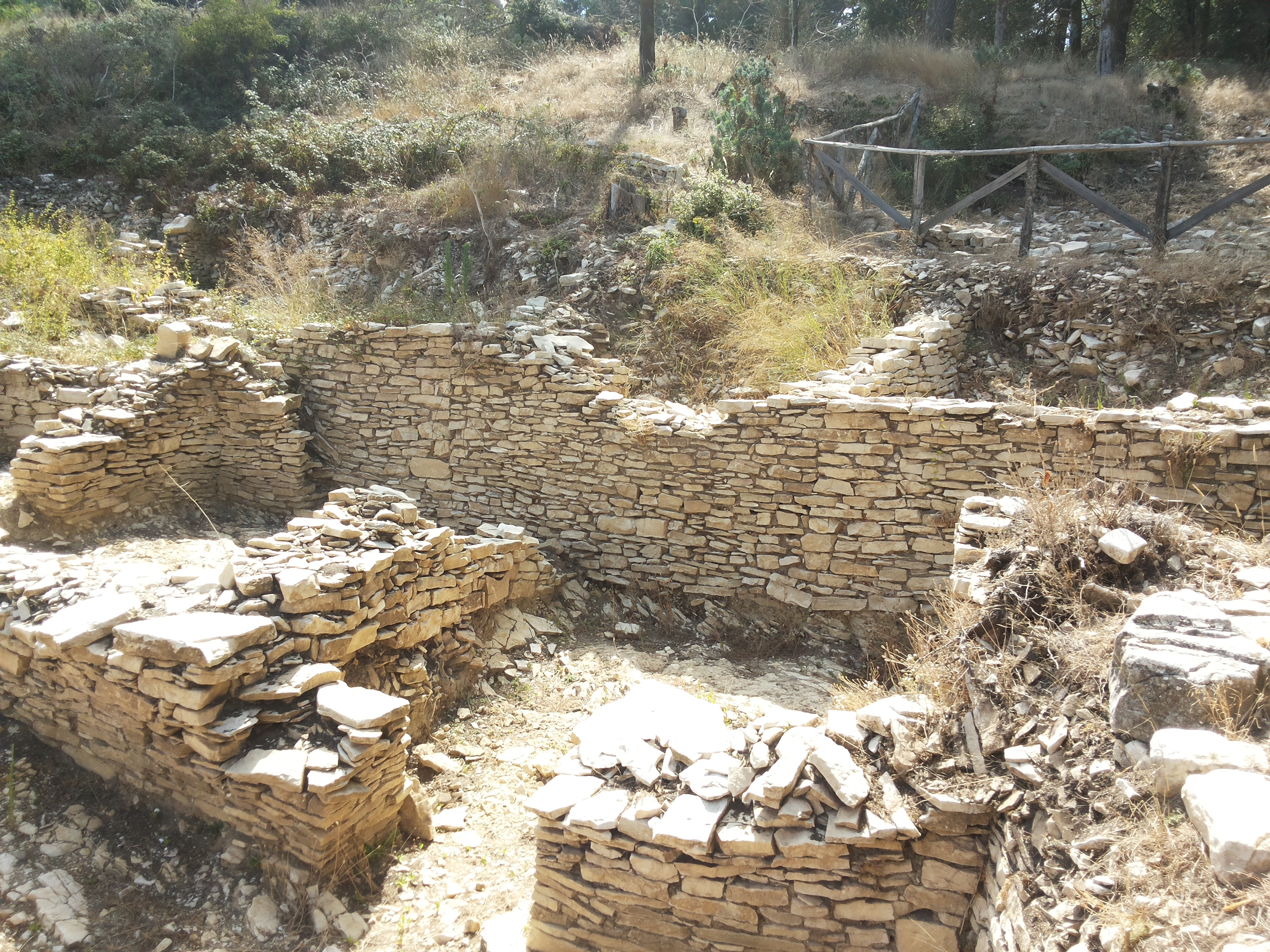
- the site with excavations

- Location within Italy
- 37°57′26″N 12°57′50″E
- Location: Alcamo, Province of Trapani, Sicily, Italy

Site notes
- Excavation dates: 1996-2014
- Condition: Preserved
- Owner: Public
- Management: Municipality of Alcamo
- Public access: yes

The archaeological site of Mount Bonifato is situated in the municipality of Alcamo, in the province of Trapani, Sicily, Italy.

Historical references to the site date back to the 3rd century BC. According to the Hellenistic scholar Lycophron of Alexandria, one of the early contributors to the Library of Alexandria, the mount was once home to a settlement named Longuro. Lycophron claimed that this ancient village was founded by a group of Greek colonists who had fled the destruction of Troy.

Archaeological evidence indicates that the area was continuously inhabited from approximately the 7th century BC until the 12th century AD. The name Longuro was historically used not only for the settlement but also for the mountain itself, which has also been referred to by the names Aereo and Longarico, the latter being the Latinized form of Longuro. During the Roman period, the population gradually relocated from the summit to the lower slopes of Mount Bonifato, likely in order to devote themselves to agricultural activities in the surrounding fertile lands.

== Excavations ==
Since the second half of the 16th century, several scholars have identified some localities of archeological interest on this mount, such as the remains of the old village, which were identified by Tommaso Fazello.

Later, the archaeological ruins became subjects of research by historians from Alcamo, such as Ignazio De Blasi in the 18th century and Vincenzo di Giovanni in the 19th century. In the Regional Archeological Museum Antonio Salinas there are some lanterns and stamps of bricks dating back to the Roman period, found by Pietro Maria Rocca (a historian of Alcamo) during the 19th century.

The first excavations have brought to light some cave tombs. These produced no finds inside them, because they had been reused by farmers in the following periods. Later investigations have uncovered artefacts and remains of very ancient settlements, including a house dating back to the 6th-7th centuries B.C., and bronze and ceramic fragments which are preserved at the Museo Baglio Anselmi in Marsala. In recent years the excavations have been conducted within the work of the field schools organized by Legambiente (1996), Archeoclub of Trapani-Erice (2000), LIPU (2001) and Gruppo Archeologico Drepanon (from 2007 to 2010), within the initiative called "Progetto Bunifat".

== Settlements ==
Following the excavations made in 2014, and the restoration interventions of the two cisterns, carried out by the Libero Consorzio Comunale di Trapani under the scientific supervision of the Soprintendenza dei Beni Culturali of Trapani, dottoressa Rossella Giglio and the archeologist Giuseppina Mammina, and directed by the archeologist Antonina Stellino, the first scientific grounds have been laid to gain a more clear understanding of the settlements.

The excavations have brought to light an outlying urban district, providing evidence of activity from the 8th century BC to the 13th century AD. The urban district of the medieval period (13th century) shows the last phase of the settlement. This persisted as late as 1396, when the site on the mountain was abandoned after the restoration of the Castle of Ventimiglia. Following these excavations eight houses were discovered, with their doors: four are located on the mountain side, and four on the down side, separated by the street leading to the village. In addition, backing onto the unicellular houses a retaining wall was discovered, about 20 metres long, where traces of rooms, probably for sentinels, can be seen. These walls were built using the dry-stone technique, with squared blocks of local limestone.

From the 6th century B.C. Mount Bonifato very probably had the status of a satellite to the nearby town of Segesta. Further, the site shows unusual traces of human settlement during the period of the Roman Empire. After the 3rd-2nd century B.C. the Romans directed their interest towards the vale of the mount and along the coast of the gulf of Castellammare, to the west along the valley of the Fiume Freddo (later Fiume Caldo), and to the east to the valley of the Finocchio and Calatubo torrents.

The walls brought to light testify to a continuous presence from the 9th century on. When the Arabs came to Mount Bonifato, they chose to build their houses in the same place where those of former periods had stood. Moreover they found a safe place here, and adequate resources for a lifestyle suited to their family units, thanks to the presence of water.

The cisterns

The cisterns of the medieval era (termed A and B) date back to the 13th century AD. The date is confirmed by the construction techniques used and by the finding of green glazed ceramics of that period. The work on their recovery and restoration involved the removal of the humus and other material which completely filled both cisterns. Cistern A, about 4 metres high and 6 metres long, was used by various unicellular houses. Cistern B, which is smaller than the other, is about 2.85 metres by 4.30 metres.

Cistern A, which dates to the medieval period, has been exposed entirely: it is formed of squared blocks, and its interior and floor are plastered. In the northern side there is a trapdoor from which water was drawn, while on the side of the mountain is found the channelling for the inflow of water. An inscription was found inside Cistern B, with the date 1264. The other inscriptions may indicate mathematical calculations for the construction of the cistern, or relating to its capacity.

== Finds ==
The finds material recovered from the "urban district" includes above all ceramics, and also some fragments in bronze and iron, stone bullets, a chopper, organic material of animal origin, and millstones. Among the most ancient materials found are some specimens handmade from paste, but also items made on the wheel. The types of ceramics discovered can be distinguished chronologically, beginning in the 7th century B.C. These include discoveries which can be assigned to the proto-Elymus, indigenous, Attic, Ionic and Hellenistic periods. This confirms that there was continuous contact with Segesta and with other Elymus centres of western Sicily.

Among the undecorated ceramics are some fragments of large containers used for the storage of victuals (pithoi), mortars, pans and dishes. Specimens of ceramics with geometrical decoration were also discovered, both hand-formed and wheel-made, including bowls, amphoras and jugs. The materials found inside the houses (including filters, commonly used ceramics and, above all, glazed pottery), as concerning the clay, show that there was an evolution of refinement in production, fictile material and firing, leading to more elegant types of vases, even though the aesthetics of the ceramics were not especially important to those who used them, their rural life being mainly concerned with purely essential matters.

== The site today ==
The site, dating back to the Iron Age, was opened to the public on 15 December 2015. The excavations were financed by the ex Province of Trapani; after these public works, the Archeoclub d’Italia Calatub, as a group of volunteers, has dealt with its clearing, monitoring, safeguarding, protection, promotion and the diffusion of popular knowledge about it. Since 2014, the archaeologist Antonina Stellino, from Alcamo, has been engaged with the fixing and classification of the finds discovered in this site, in anticipation of the creation of an Antiquarium in Alcamo.

== See also ==
- Roman furnaces in Alcamo
- Mount Bonifato
- Nature Reserve Bosco di Alcamo
- Geosite Travertino della Cava Cappuccini (Alcamo)
