= Sanctuary of Maria Santissima del Fiume =

Church building in Alcamo, Italy

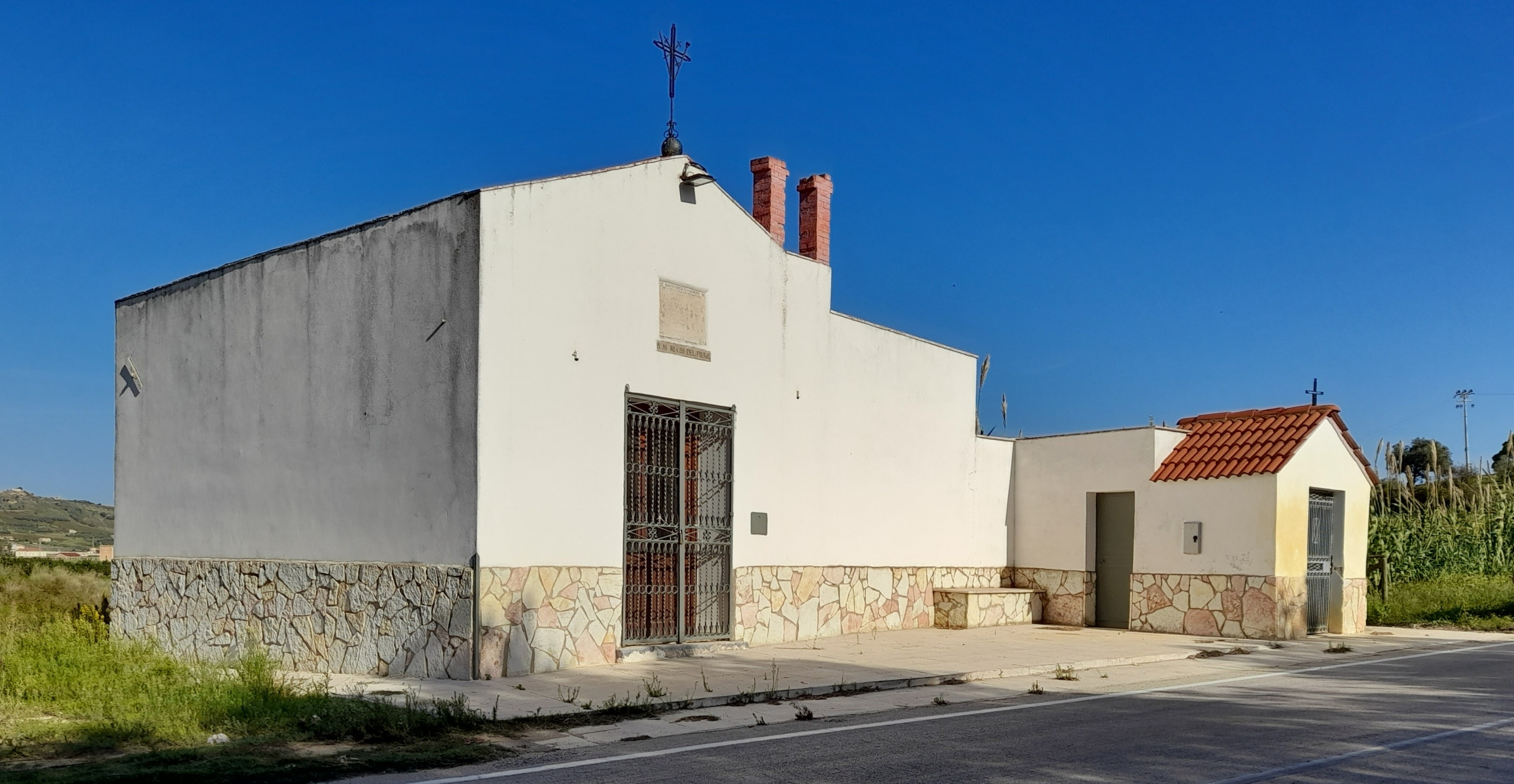

Religion
- Affiliation: Roman Catholic
- Province: province of Trapani
- Region: Sicily
- Rite: Catholic
- Patron: Our Lady of the River

Location
- Location: Alcamo, province of Trapani, Italy
- Municipality: Alcamo
- State: Italy
- Interactive map of Sanctuary of Maria Santissima del Fiume
- Territory: Alcamo
- Coordinates: 37°58′08″N 12°55′18″E

Architecture
- Groundbreaking: 20th century
- Completed: 1920

The Sanctuary of Maria Santissima del Fiume is located in the territory of Alcamo (Province of Trapani, in the Trunk Road 113 (strada statale 113), just after the junction Alcamo Ovest of Autostrada A29 (Italy).

== History ==
In July 1820 there were some insurrections in Naples and Sicily; the reason was the concession of the Constitution of Spain by Ferdinand I of the Two Sicilies, most of the population, on the contrary, would have liked the sicilian Constitution of 1812 . In Alcamo this rebellion, against taxes and the duty on wine, was known as Lu ribeddu di lu 1820; there were the assault against the Town Hall and the destruction of several documents, they even put houses and notary publics on fire, killed some important people, including two police officers.

In Palermo the Bourbons were thrown out and they formed a provisional government that asked for independence; in order to suppress these insurrections, the king sent the general Florestano Pepe with about 60.000 soldiers from Naples. While Colonel Flugy was moving from Trapani towards Palermo, he was forced to withdraw with his troops as he was fought off by the rebels from Alcamo, rushed in great numbers in the area of the Crimisus(river) (fiume Freddo).

The tradition assigns a miracle to Our Lady of the River (Madonna del Fiume), through the providential rains that stopped the Bourbon troops; in her honour they built a chapel. General Pepe, being considered weak against the rebels, was obliged to return to Naples, and General Pietro Colletta, who replaced him, suppressed the insurrection.

The poet Peppi Enia, in his poem in eighths entitled Lu ribeddu di lu 1820, refers to the aedicula which today is located next to the chapel near the river, with these words:

Pi stu triunfu di l'antichitati

Sta figuredda a stu ciumi viditi.

(That is: For this old triumph, you can see this fiuredda near the river).

=== Description ===
The sanctuary was built in the early 1900s; inside it there is the statue of Our Lady of the River, carved by Giuseppe Ospedale in 1925, and a fresco on the ceiling realized by Liborio Pirrone, a painter from Alcamo. In May the chapel is a centre of pilgrimages, above all on Saturday mornings when they celebrate Mass. The feast, together with its rural festival, is held on the first Sunday of August.

== See also ==
- Sanctuary of Madonna dei Miracoli
- Sanctuary of Maria Santissima dell'Alto

== Sources ==
- Salvatore Messina: Alcamo nella storia, nella leggenda e nell’arte; ed. Campo, 2015
- Carlo Cataldo: I Giardini di Adone p. 248; Grafiche Campo, Alcamo, 1992
- P.Enia: Lu ribeddu di lu 1820, Alcamo, 1922
- F.M.Mirabella: Alcamensia p. 101-103; ed.Sarograf, Alcamo, 1980
- G.Mistretta di Paola: Tristi effetti dell'insurrezione siciliana del 1820 in Alcamo; in: il Popolo di Trapani, Trapani 12 ottobre 1935
- Dom.Scinà: Raccolta di notizie e documenti della rivoluzione siciliana del 1820; manoscritto Qq H138 della Biblioteca Comunale di Palermo
