= Madonna del Ladro Buono =

Church building in Alcamo, Italy

- Chiesetta della Madonna del Ladro Buono
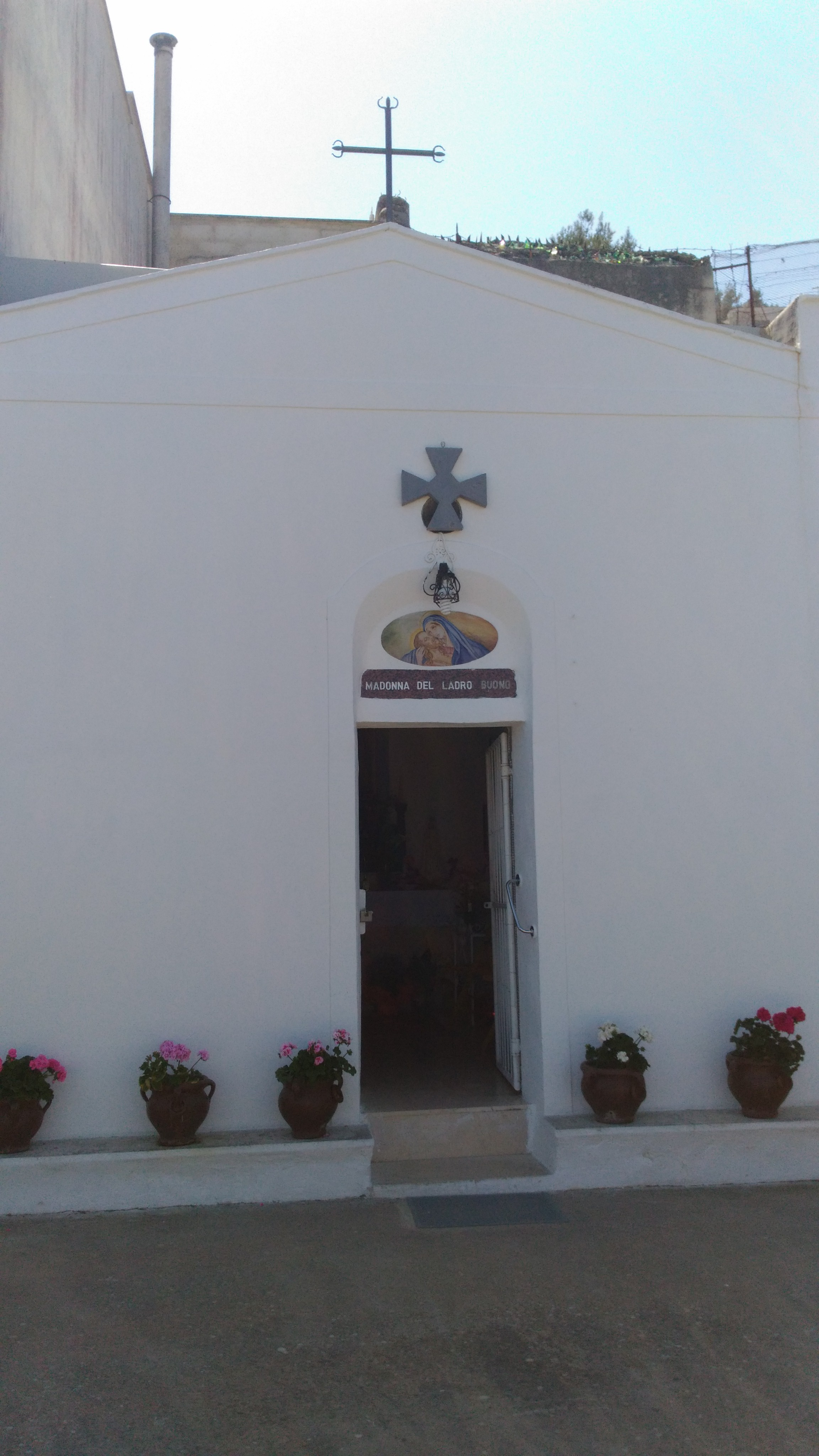
- The façade

Religion
- Affiliation: Catholic
- Province: province of Trapani
- Region: Sicily
- Rite: Catholic
- Patron: Madonna della Pietà

Location
- Location: Alcamo, province of Trapani, Italy
- Municipality: Alcamo
- State: Italy
- Interactive map of Madonna del Ladro Buono
- Territory: Alcamo
- Coordinates: 37°58′08″N 12°57′46″E

Architecture
- Completed: 1989

Madonna del Ladro Buono ("Madonna of the Good Thief", in Sicilian Madonna di lu Tribonu or Madonna di lu Latru Bonu) is a Catholic church in Alcamo, in the province of Trapani.

== Description ==
The little church, with an image of Mary's Pietà with Jesus taken down from the Cross, is located 200 metres (660 ft) above the town waterworks at the same level as the second turn in the road leading to the top of Mount Bonifato.

According to tradition, there was a thief living as a penitent in that place who nurtured veneration for the image. In a letter sent to Don Tommaso Papa in 1931, Francesco Maria Mirabella wrote that the legend of the Good Thief was an invention of Liborio Dia, a poet from Alcamo, and that "Tribonu" is an alteration of "Tribona" in the dialect of Alcamo. "Tribona" is a niche surmounting an altar or an aedicula.

Professor Carlo Cataldo discovered that the word "Tribona" has been in use since at least the 17th century, as a deed dated 1674 mentions an enclosure on the mountain which was called "la Tribona", where there were trees such as sumac and other plants. It is mentioned in other documents dated 1723, 1810, and 1928.

== Tradition ==
In the early 1930s, locals went on pilgrimage to the church every Friday in March during Lent. The dialectal poet Giuseppe Fulco noted the pilgrimages had become merely an excuse for a trip to the countryside, as he complained in one of his poems:

E ci vannu a bella posta
Donni schetti e maritati,
Pri ballari senza sosta
E piscari quattru ucchiati.

(That is: they go there intentionally, girls and ladies, to dance without a break, and get some looks).

In 1989 the church was restored by the owners, the Mancuso family, including placing the name "Madonna del Ladro Buono" on the façade. They replaced the old print representing Our Lady of Sorrows and Jesus Christ taken down the cross with a painting by Stefano Papa, an artist from Alcamo.

On the right side of the altar is an ancient cistern, the water from which believers drank the water to purify their souls and bodies.
