= Calatubo Castle =

Castle in Alcamo, Sicily, Italy

- Alcamo in Italy
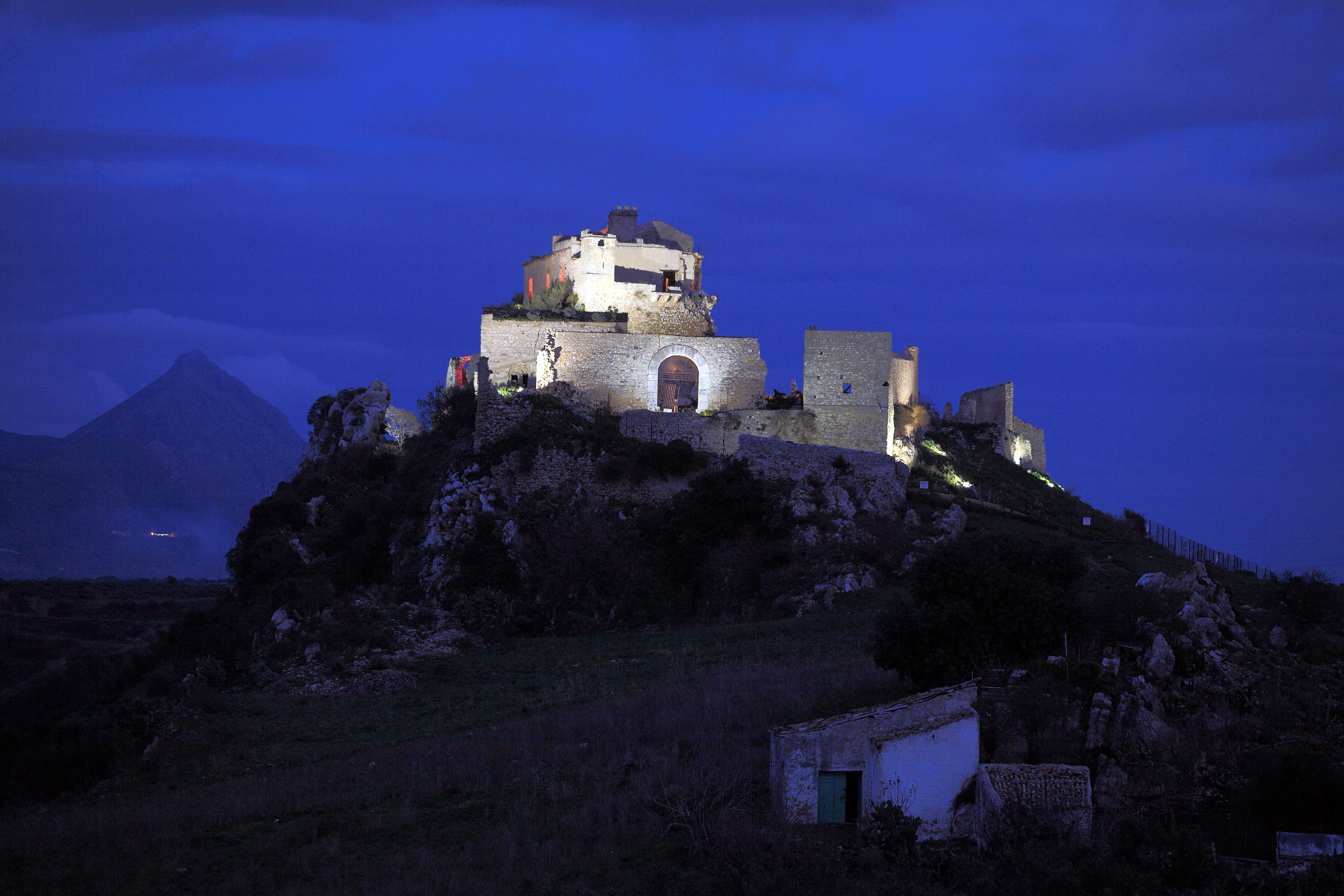
- Night view of Calatubo Castle.

Site information
- Type: Castle
- Open to the public: no
- Condition: abandoned

Location
- Coordinates: 38°00′53″N 12°59′09″E

The Calatubo Castle (Latin: castrum Calathatubi; Italian: Castello di Calatubo) is a fortress located near the town of Alcamo, Sicily, southern Italy.

The site has remains of a settlement of the Elymians and a necropolis.

Being next to A29 motorway, it has fallen into disrepair and is therefore closed to visitors, although the Town Council of Alcamo has often expressed the desire to recover it.

== History ==
The origins of the castle date back to the Norman period around 1093, the year in which Roger I of Sicily defined the boundaries of the diocese of Mazara that included "Calatubo with all its dependencies".

In ancient times, around the castle there was the village of Calatubo, which based its business on the extraction of stones for water and wind mills from the quarries around the creek Finocchio, as mentioned by the Arab geographer Muhammad al-Idrisi in The Book of Roger, written in 1154.

The village of Calatubo was abandoned after the conquest by Frederick II and the castle lost its original function as a military fortress, turning into a farm. During this period, the castle joined warehouses, stables and other structures used for the administration of the agricultural fief of Calatubo.

Since the Middle Ages, because of its visibility, the Calatubo Castle had an important strategic role: it was part of a line of towers and forts along the coast from Palermo to Trapani; this defensive line was used to transmit light signals in case of Saracens' attack. In particular, the castle of Calatubo guaranteed the flow of information that took place between the outposts of Carini, Partinico and Castellammare del Golfo.

At the end of the nineteenth century in the second courtyard some warehouses were set up for the production of the wine "Calatubo".

The castle remained in good condition until the 1968 Belice earthquake. The use of the structure as a sheepfold and illegal excavations, which had as their targets the finds of the necropolis of the seventh century BC pertaining to the castle, have further ruined the castle.

In 2007 it was bought for 60 thousand euros by the municipality of Alcamo and over the past few years (2003–2014) has been reported several times as part of the cultural initiative "I Luoghi del Cuore" sponsored by the Italian Environmental Fund (FAI), which has as its objective the protection and enhancement of the artistic and cultural heritage of Italy.

== Description ==
The Calatubo Castle is actually an architectural complex, consisting of the structure of the original castle that has undergone several changes over the centuries. This complex is large 150×35 meters and stands on a limestone rock that lies at an altitude of about 152 m above sea level and that dominate with its height the surrounding area. From the position of castle you can clearly see Mount Bonifato and the Gulf of Castellammare.

The castle is inaccessible on three sides due to the steep walls of rock on which it is built. The only practicable access is located in the west, which leads to the first line of defense of the castle via a ramp with large steps. From the first line of defense, which includes among other things a well, a church hall and other premises, you can arrive at a court which communicates with the second circle of walls through a portal, up to the third circle of walls, which comprises an oblong tower. Finally the core of the castle, located in the southern part of the fortress, is rectangular with an area of 7×21.50 m.

== Popular culture ==
A popular belief tells about tunnels that linked the Calatubo Castle with the Castle of the Counts of Modica and the tower of Ventimiglia on the Mount Bonifato.

== See also ==
- Alcamo
- Castle of Alcamo
- Castle of Ventimiglia
