= Sanctuary of Maria Santissima dell'Alto =

Church building in Alcamo, Italy

Santuario della Madonna dell'Alto
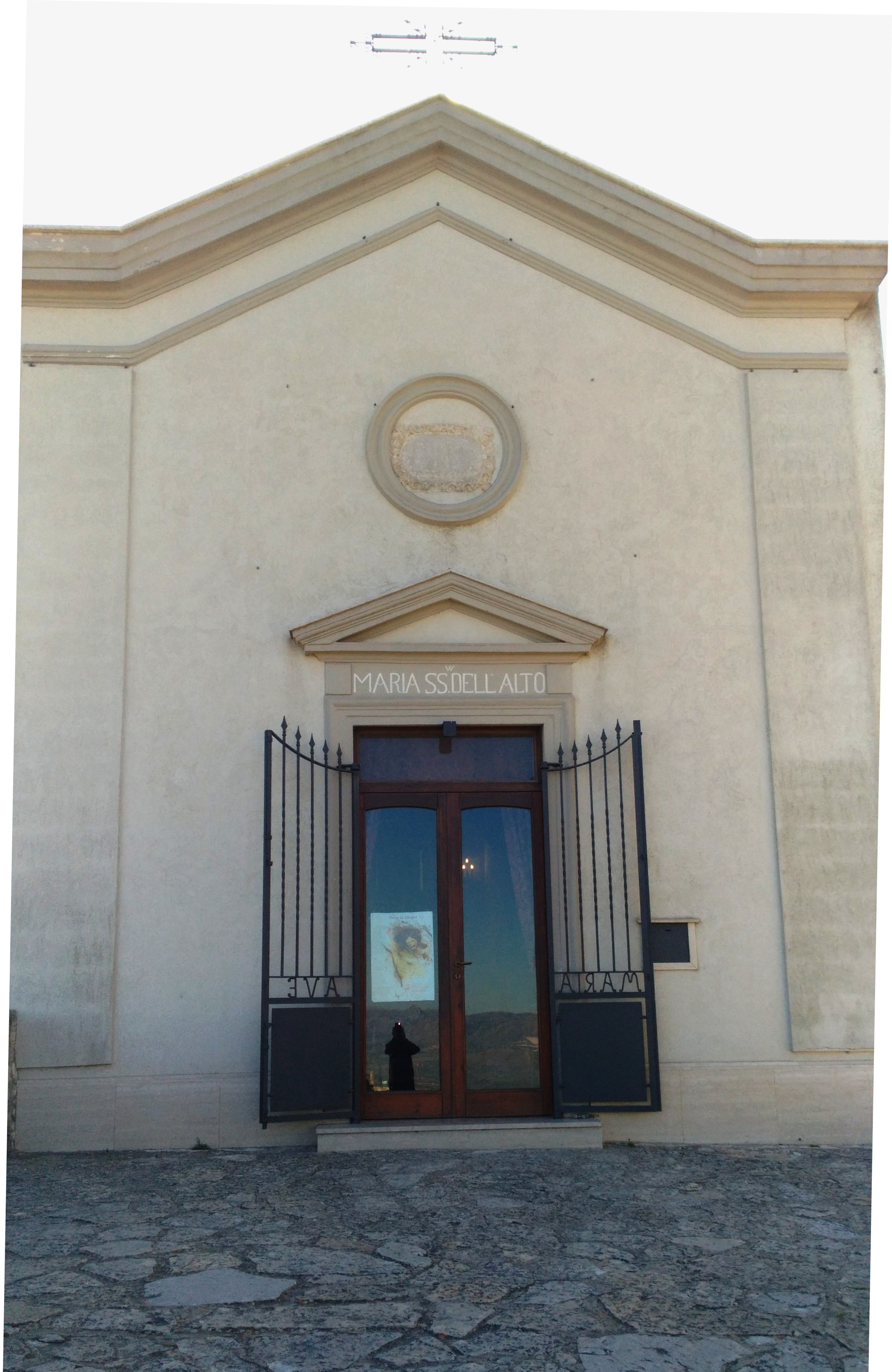
- The façade

Religion
- Affiliation: Roman Catholic
- Province: province of Trapani
- Region: Sicily
- Rite: Catholic
- Patron: the Most Holy Mary of the Height

Location
- Location: Alcamo, province of Trapani, Italy
- Municipality: Alcamo
- State: Italy
- Interactive map of Santuario della Madonna dell'Alto
- Territory: Alcamo
- Coordinates: 37°56′55″N 12°57′38″E

Architecture
- Groundbreaking: 16th century

The Sanctuary of the Most Holy Mary of the Height (called also the Sanctuary of Maronna di l'avutu by people from Alcamo) is a place of Marian devotion, located on the top of Mount Bonifato, in Alcamo in the province of Trapani, Italy.

== Foundation ==
A 16th century legend tells that an old icon of the Virgin, dating back to a previous period and later lost, had been found, nearly painted on the ground and covered with earth among the walls of the castle on the Bonifato; as a devout man wanted it to rise from the ground, he started to pray the Virgin Mary in order that she arose a little and so he could build an altar there. The following day the sacred image was at his desired height, and so the pious man had soon the altar built.

The first document which speaks about a church on this mountain, founded by three Carmelite friars, dates back to 1558 in a deed of the notary P. A. Balduccio. After the discovery of the miraculous icon, mount Bonifato started to be the destination of pilgrimages (called "Holy Journeys") by the believers who helped the friars to build or, even better, to rebuild the Church of the Most Holy Lady of the Height in the same place of the recovery.

== Historical hints ==
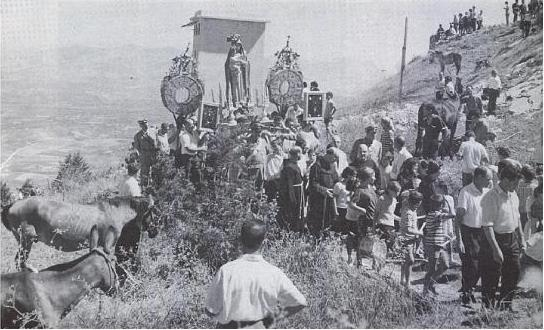
Procession in honour of Our Lady of the Height (at about 1960).

The building was about 17 metres long and 7 metres large, with its entrance towards east and the bell tower above it; inside there were two altars, one turned towards the entrance door, with Jesus’ image, and the other towards south, with the icon of "Our Lady of the Height".

In 1583 the Church was already in a state of neglect, and in order to restore it, in 1643 the hermit Rosario from Palermo began to collect money among the believers, but later, abandoning this project, he moved to Palermo. After a miracle, they authorized the foundation of the congregation of Santa Maria dell'Alto (formed by noblemen, priests, and commoners who immediately undertook the restoration of the Church) governed by a statute approved in 1646 by the bishop of Mazara del Vallo

The members of the congregation met on Friday and went to the sanctuary to venerate the holy image, then they remained to meditate together with the Carmelites. On Saturday, the day dedicated to the cult of the Virgin Mary, they confessed, received Communion and got back to the town.

In 1930, on the initiative of the priest Paolo Amato, the rector of the sanctuary of that time, they founded a "Commission for the Church of the Most Holy Mary of the Height", later a Congregation, which still exists. According to the Statute, its scopes were:

- collaborating, together with the rector, on the religious services in the church.
- be responsible for the maintenance of the building, the adjoining premises and the road leading to the church.
- celebrating the feast of the Nativity of the Virgin Mary, on 8 September every year, with the solemnity given by the cash situation and the offerings of believers.
- taking part to the Sacraments on Sundays and the festivities of Our Lord Jesus Christ and the Blessed Virgin Mary, do the Stations of the Cross along the road leading to the sanctuary, on the Saturdays preceding the feast of the Nativity of the Virgin Mary.

The festivity will be completed by the procession with the statue of Our Lady.

== Description and works ==
The church, which was restored in 1930 for the last time, is with one nave and three altars: the high altar, the altar of Saint Joseph and that of the Most Holy Crucifix. Among the last modifications, there were a new altar and lectern, designed by the architect Vincenzo Settipani.

Inside it there are the following works:

- Wooden statue of Our Lady of the Height (1993), made by Giuseppe Ospedale (in the sacristy, donated by Pirrello Gaspare)
- Wooden statue of Our lady of the Height (1950), made by Luigi Santifaller; on the high altar.
- Painting of the Virgin Mary on a zinc sheet, made by Liborio Mirabile, restored in 1930 by the priest Francesco Alesi and worked over by Mariano Coppola in 1982.
- Painting of Saint Joseph.
- Painting of Saint Francis of Paola.
- Painting of Our Lady of Paradise.
- Crucifix in papier-maché.

The original painting depicting Our Lady and the 1644 wooden statue is lost.

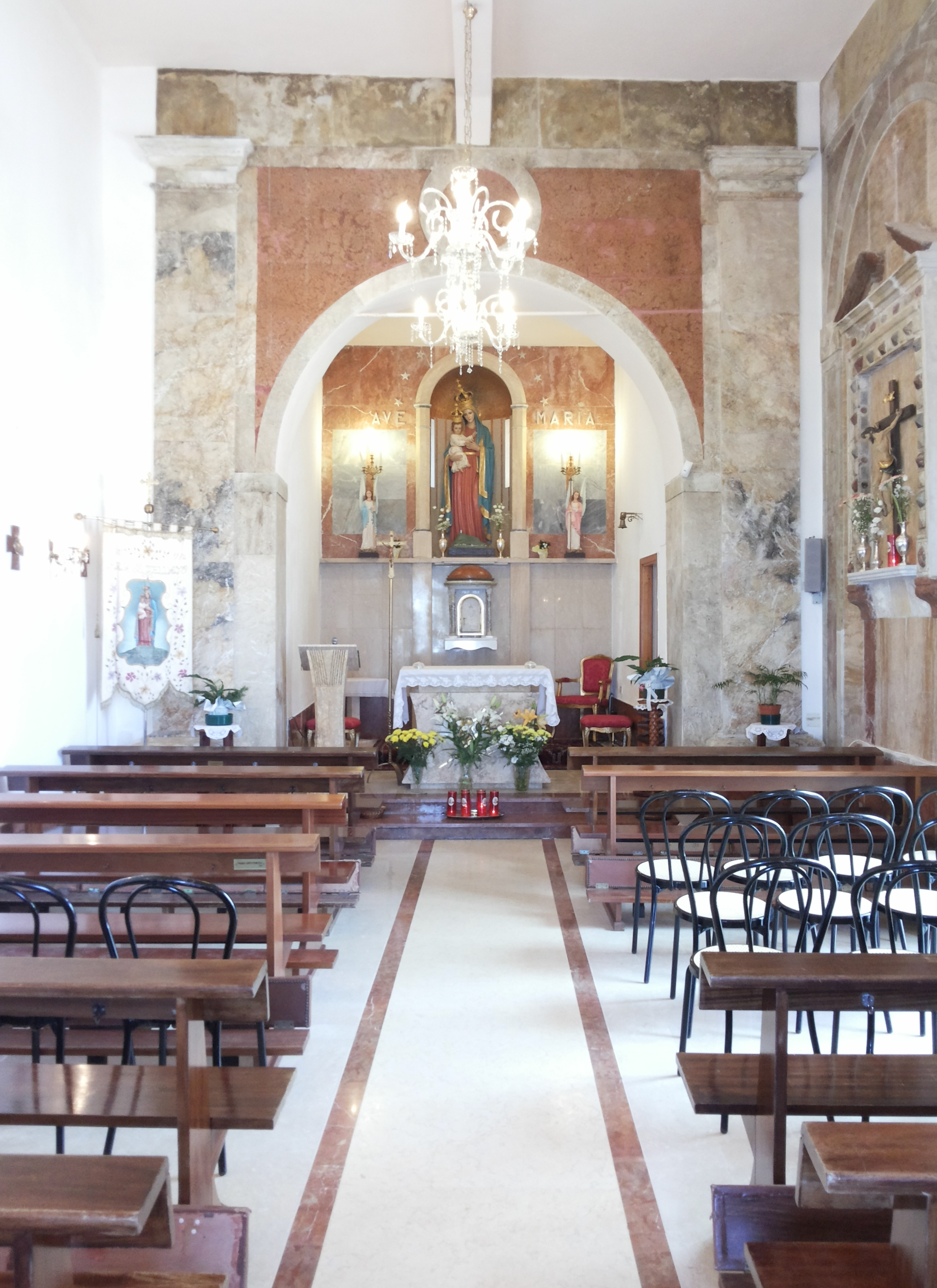
Interior of the Church

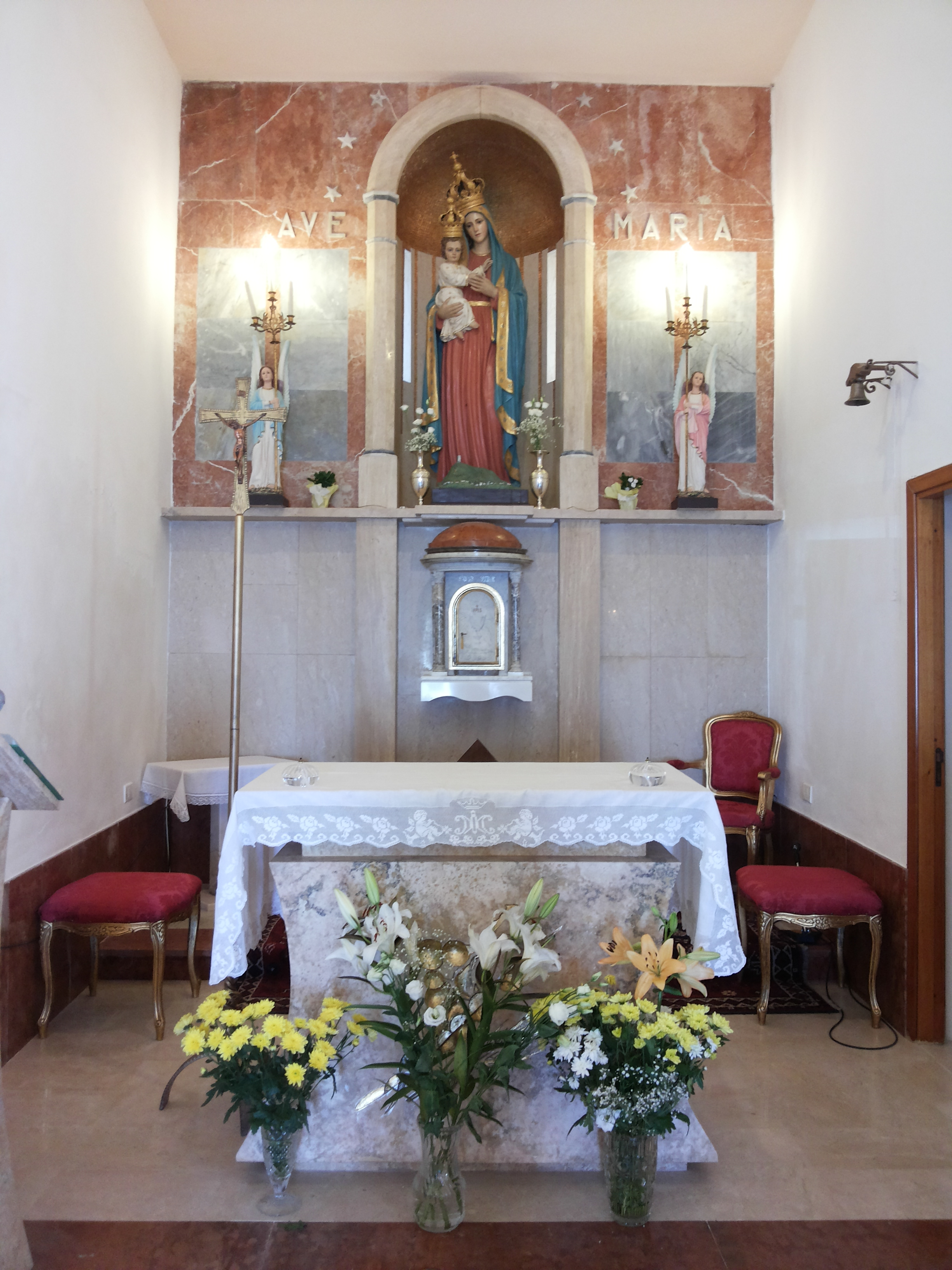
The high altar with the statue of Our Lady of the Height (1950)

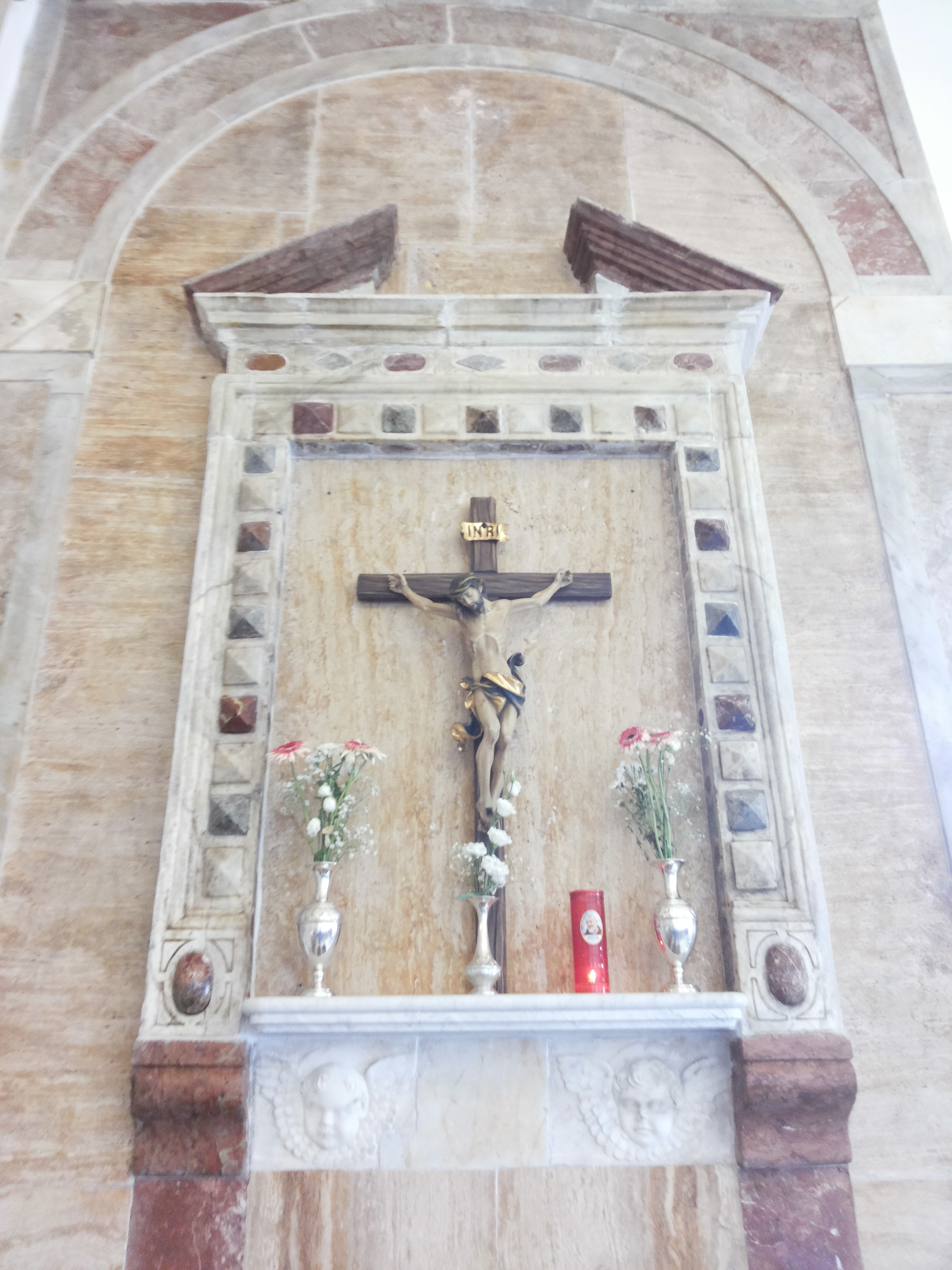
Papier-maché Crucifix on a side altar

== Traditions ==
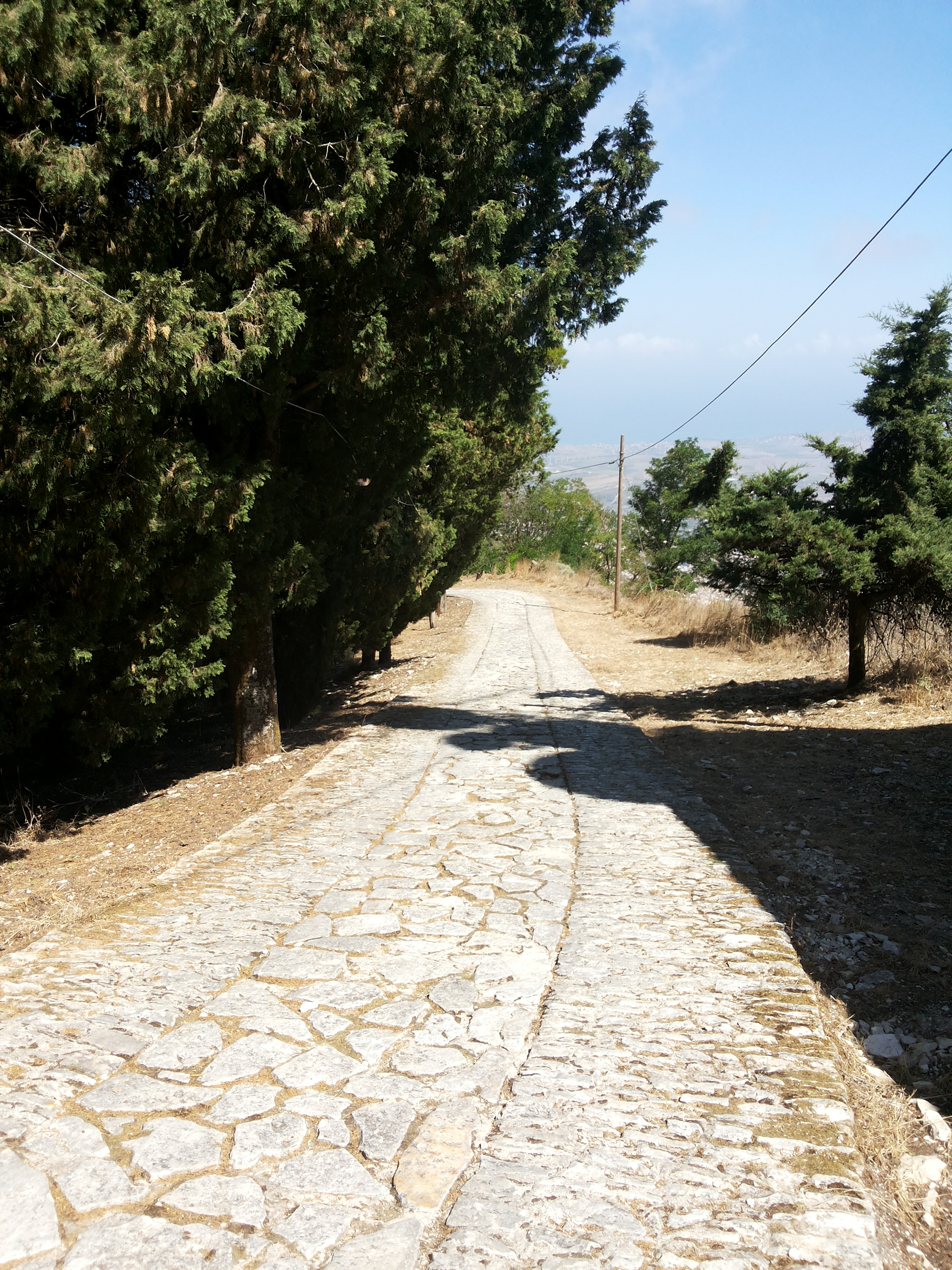
The pathway leading to the sanctuary

Along the holy road of the pilgrimages there were placed 14 figurelle, that is stations of the Cross: during this journey the believers said the rosary of Our Lady of the Height. These figurelle were placed there in 1703; some years ago the administration of the congregation had the new wooden ones made.

In the 16th century some girls, dressed like the Virgin Mary and with a black veil, went on pilgrimage as far as the top of the mountain to plead for the coming of rain, as the poet Sebastiano Bagolino says in one of his poems. On 2 November, the day of the commemoration of the Dead, they made a pilgrimage for their souls.

The feast was accompanied with the use of torchs and bonfires ('the blazes', vampi in dialect) which represented a very old propitiatory tradition of fire which is a symbol of purification, like in many popular festivities held in Europe; the flame also represents the death of the old sin and the light of the new man after he has received baptism.

In past times, along the streets of Alcamo and above all in via Santissimo Salvatore and Piazzetta Trinità, they prepared small altars, and in the evening they sang the litanies of Our Lady of the Height at the light of small oil lamps. This is one of these short prayers:

Di lu munti cumparìu
Chista amabili Signura
e la vitti sant'Elia
ch'è di l'autu Maria

(That is: 'from the mount this lovely Lady appeared, and Saint Elijah saw her, because she is Mary of the Height'). The bonfires (li vampati in dialect), scattered at the crossings on the eve, were moments of happiness for the young; nowadays they also make them in the beach of Alcamo Marina and in the countryside surrounding the town, but old traditions have nearly disappeared.

Every year the religious events take place between August and September; after a triduum of preparation, the last Sunday of August the believers go, on foot, on a pilgrimage from the Church of the Holy Heart as far as the sanctuary. Then there is a Marian week, with songs, saying of the rosary and masses in the sanctuary, and finally, on 8 September, the feast of the Nativity of the Virgin Mary, they take the statue of Our Lady in procession. After the procession, there is often a recital of chants and poems in dialect, to praise Our Lady of the Height.

The parish of the Church of the Holy Heart and the Congregation of Maria Santissima dell’Alto have contributed to the improvement of the sanctuary that today has become a sought-after destination for many pilgrims and believers.

== See also ==
- Alcamo
- Castle of Ventimiglia
- Mount Bonifato
- Sanctuaries
- Sanctuary of Madonna of Miracles

== Sources ==
- Cataldo, Carlo. "Accanto alle Aquile". www.trapaninostra.it (in Italian).
- Calia Roberto, Craparo Enzo, Baldassano Cataldo Erina: Itinerari in Sicilia – La Bella Alcamo – Religiosità e Tradizioni, pp. 56–57; Cartograf, Trapani,1991
- Regina Vincenzo: Il castello trecentesco dei conti di Modica in Alcamo, con prefazione del prof.Virgilio Titone pp. 19–23; Boccone del Povero, Palermo, 1967
- Regina Vincenzo: Profilo storico di Alcamo e delle sue opere d’arte dalle origini al secolo XV; Cartograf, Trapani,1972
- Regina Vincenzo: Alcamo. Storia, arte e tradizione vol.I; Sellerio, Palermo, 1980
- Regina Vincenzo: La chiesa della Madonna dell’Alto sul monte Bonifato; Campo, Alcamo, 2005
- Alcamo Biblioteca Comunale: Archivio dei Notai defunti, Notaio P. A. Balduccio, Bastardello del 1568–69 (ANDBAL);
- Cataldo Carlo: Accanto alle aquile: Il castello alcamese di Bonifato e la chiesa di S. Maria dell’Alto; Brotto, Palermo,1991
- Cataldo Carlo: tradizioni religiose di Alcamo p. 18; Campo, Alcamo, 1984
- Cataldo Carlo: La conchiglia di S.Giacomo p. 183; Campo, Alcamo, 2001
- Papa Tommaso: La festa della Madonna dell'Alto; La Domenica, bollettino della Parrocchia S.Oliva di Alcamo, Alcamo, 4 settembre 1960
- Relacione della Venerabile chiesa di Nostra Signora dell’Alto fuori la città di Alcamo sulle cime del Monte Bonifato, s.d. Mazara, Archivio Storico Diocesano, Prima visita di Mons. Papè anno 1774, arm. 35, palc. 1, posiz. 3, f. 195r-196v.
