= Castle of the Counts of Modica (Alcamo) =

Castle in Alcamo, Sicily, Italy

- Castello dei Conti di Modica
- Alcamo in Italy
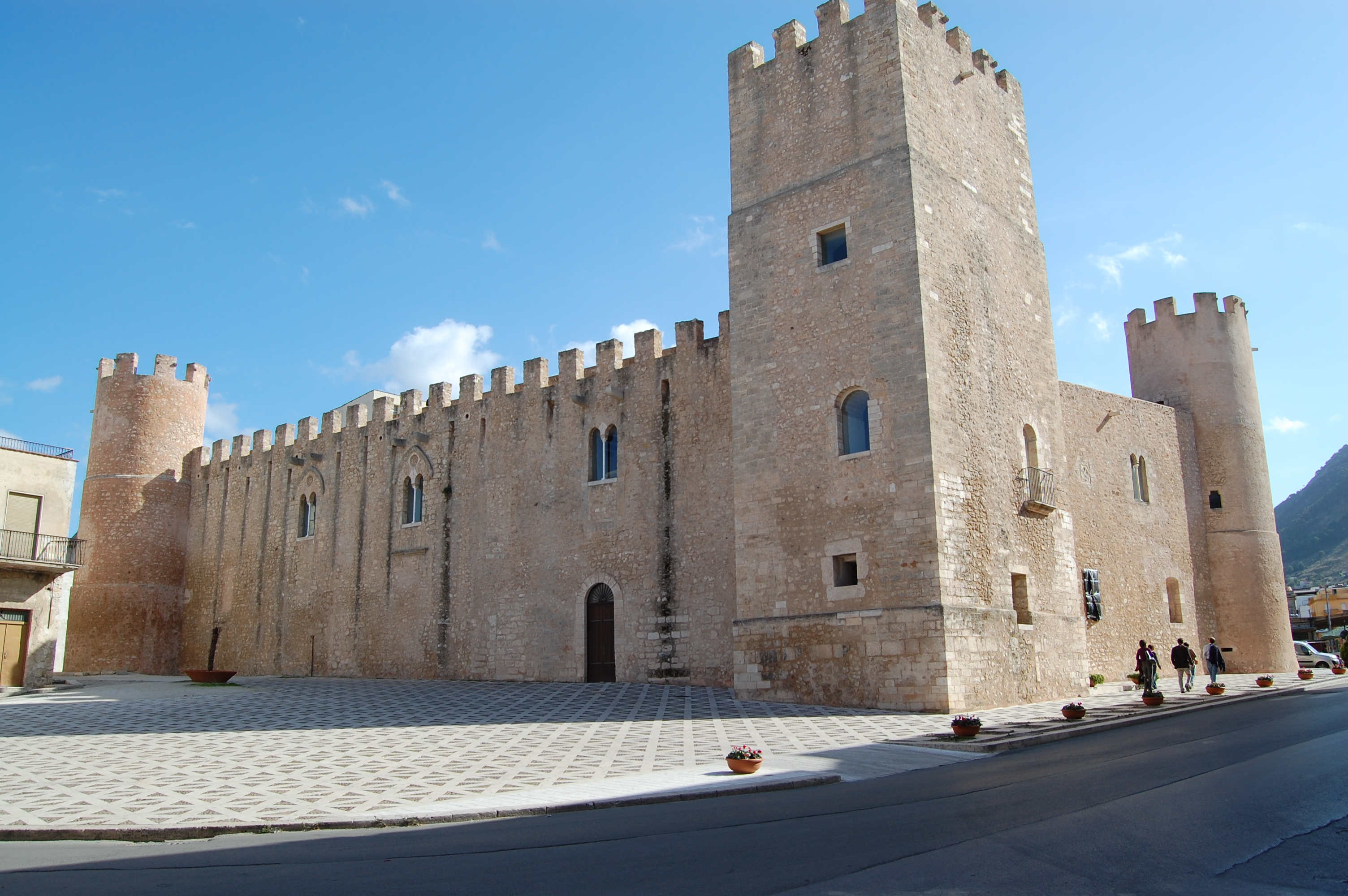
- Castle of the Counts of Modica

Site information
- Type: Castle
- Open to the public: yes (from Wednesday to Sunday)

Location
- Coordinates: 37°58′46″N 12°58′01″E

The Castle of the Counts of Modica (or Castle of Alcamo) is a medieval castle situated in the town centre of Alcamo, in the province of Trapani, Sicily, southern Italy.

== History ==
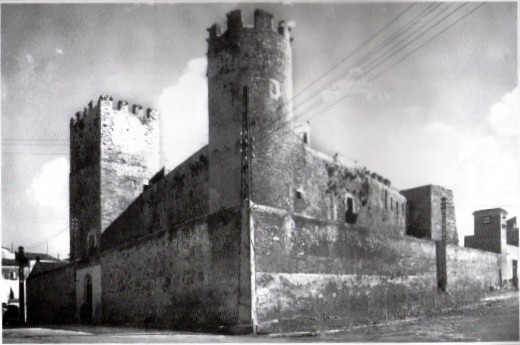
An old picture of Alcamo Castle when used as a prison.

In 1340 King Peter II of Sicily had given Raimondo Peralta terram Alcami et prefatum castrum Bonifati, without any mention about the castle; in fact, it is quoted, for the first time, in a diploma dated 1391. In this document the King Martino I confirmed to Enrico Ventimiglia, the concession made to his father, Guarnerio, by King Federico III de la terra e lu Castellu di Alcamu.

The construction of the castle was started by the Peralta family at about 1340 and was finished in 1350, under the feudatories Enrico and Federico Chiaramonte; it was a mansion and a defensive structure until the 16th century. If equipped with munitions and food, it could resist for a month and a half, quartering 30 companies of soldiers.

In 1392 king Martino and his wife were hosted in the castle after the Chiaramontes' defeat, and on September 1, 1535 the emperor Carlo V, during his return from his Tunis victory, lodged in one of its towers with his court and the infanta Eleonora d'Aragona.

In 1534 the castle was attacked by the Islamic pirate Barbarossa. From 1583 and until 1589 it had three restorations.

Since 1828, further to a sentence by Trapani Law Court, Alcamo municipality came into possession of the castle and in the following years it was used as a seat of municipal offices, prison and stable.

In 1870 there was another restoration. After the last restorations (made between 2000 and 2010), it has been used as the seat of the Ethnographic Museum and of the Historical Regional Vintage Wines Stock.

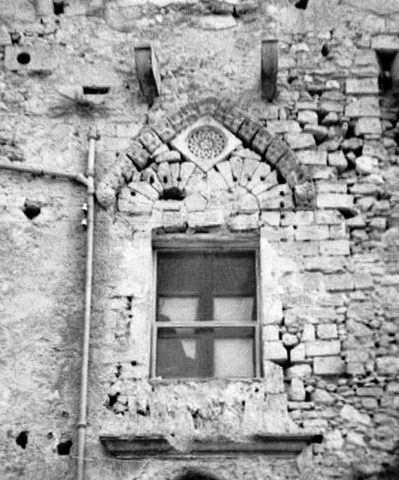
A double lancet window before its restoration (1967).

== Description ==
The castle has a rhomboidal shape, with a nearly rectangular courtyard. At the corners there are four battlemented towers (two square and two circular shaped), each of them with a particular function, that is:

- In the square and highest one (called “the main tower”) they tortured prisoners;
- the square and lowest one was reserved to sentinels;
- one of the circular towers was used to give hospitality to distinguished guests.

On the castle sides there are double and triple lancet windows of Gothic-Catalan derivation. Originally it had three doors, placed on the south, west and north sides.

In the past the castle was bounded by walls which served to hinder the castle's siege by war machines.

According to a hypothesis, which is still to be confirmed, under the castle maybe there are also some prison ditches which were used between the end of the 14th and the 18th century for the kings' imprisonment.

== See also ==
- Alcamo
- Castle of Calatubo
- Castle of Ventimiglia

== Sources ==
- Regina, Vincenzo (1967). Il Castello Trecentesco dei Conti di Modica in Alcamo. Alcamo: Boccone del Povero.
- Mirabella, Francesco Maria (1980). Alcamensia noterelle storiche. Alcamo: Sarograf.
- Marconi, Paolo (8 October 2012). Restauro dei monumenti: Cultura, progetti e cantieri 1967-2010. Gangemi Editore spa. pp. 150–157. ISBN 9788849274400.
