= Roman furnaces in Alcamo =

Archaeological complex of Alcamo Marina

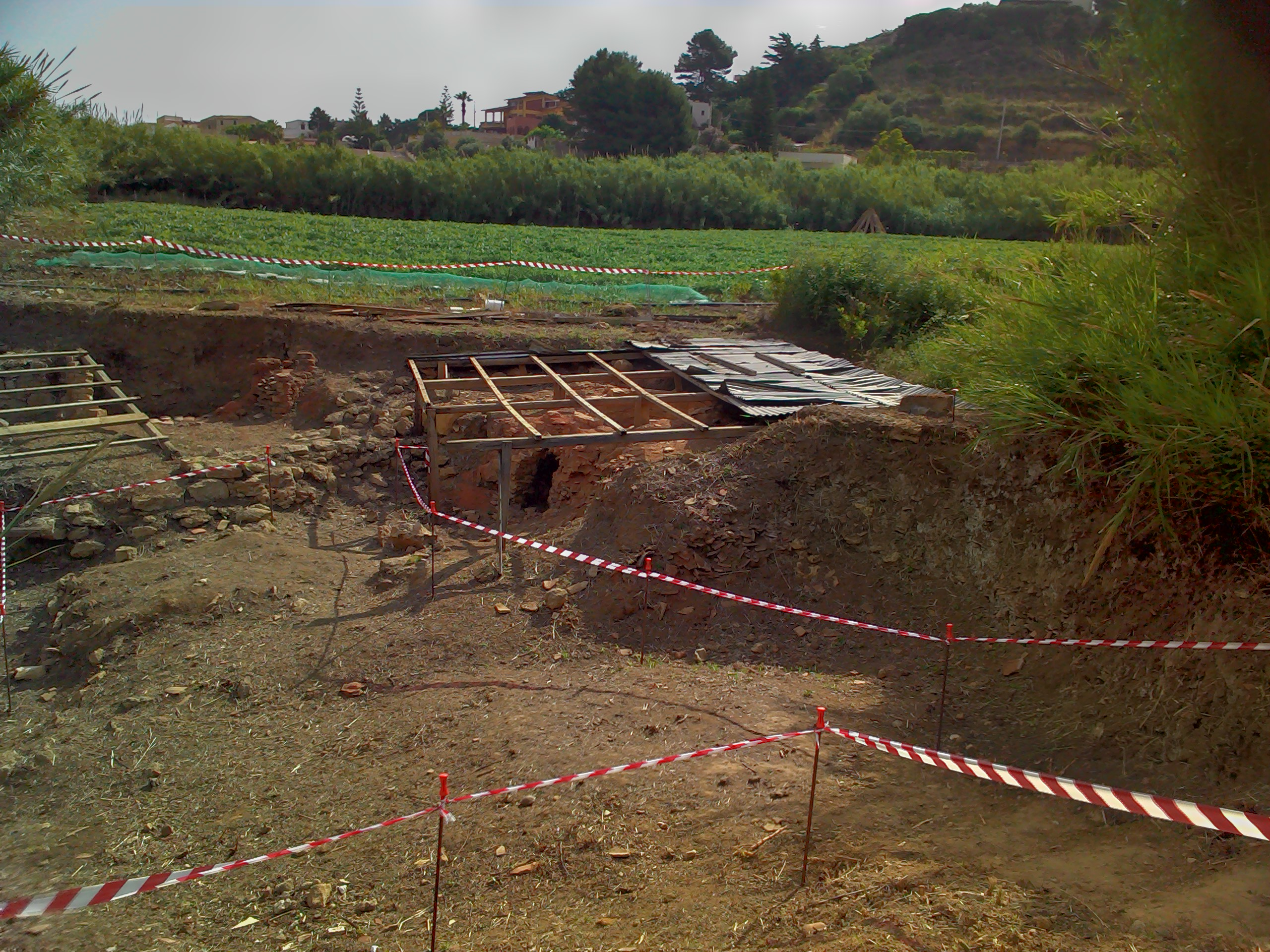
- A view of the site

- Location within Italy
- 38.021387°N 12.908522°E
- Type: Settlement
- Periods: 1st century A.D. - 3rd century A.D.
- Cultures: Roman
- Location: Alcamo, Province of Trapani, Sicily, Italy

Site notes
- Area: 2,500 sq. metres
- Excavation dates: 2003, 2004, 2005
- Archaeologists: prof. Dario Giorgetti
- Condition: Preserved
- Owner: Public
- Management: Alcamo municipality
- Public access: on request

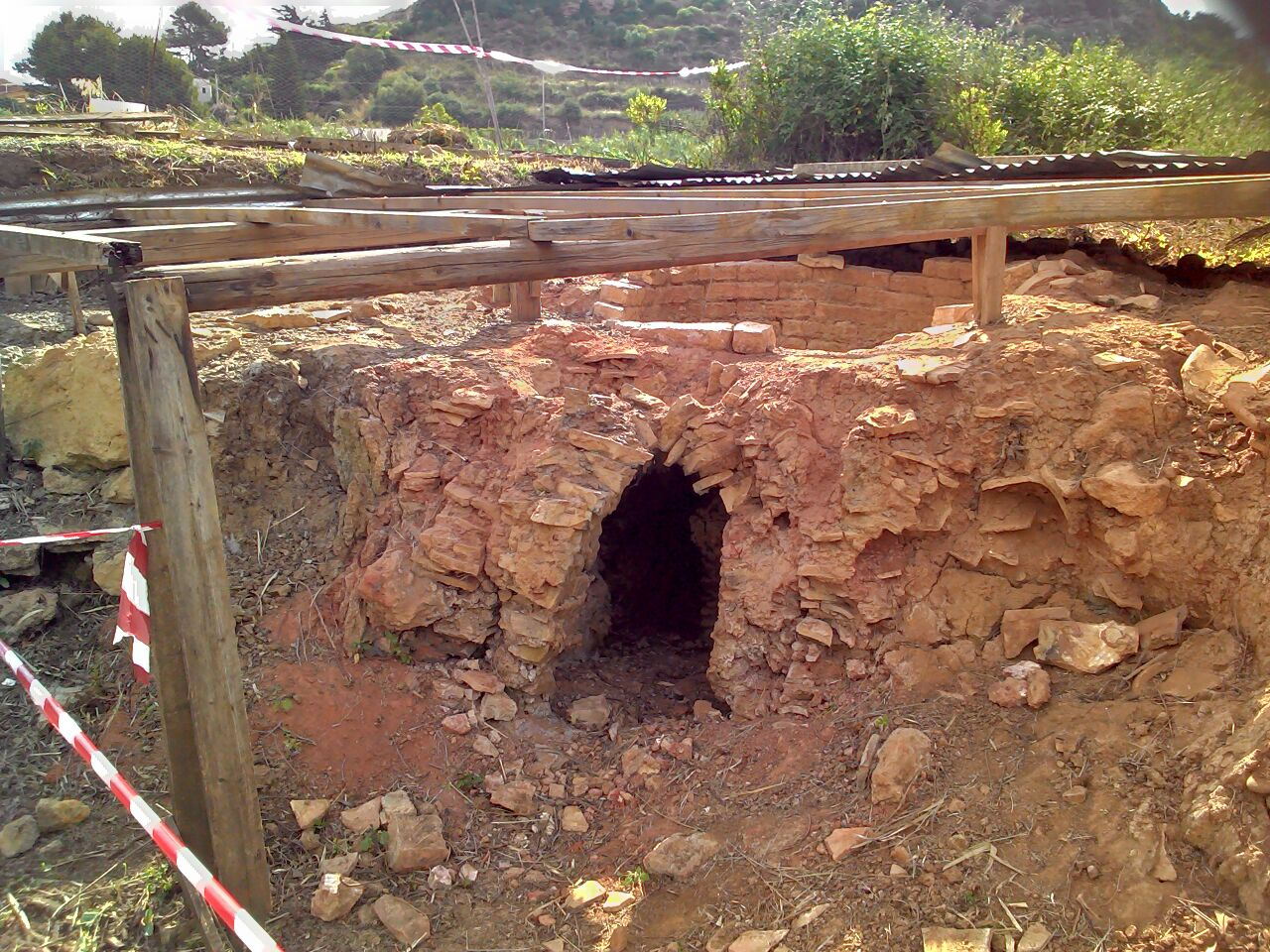
Remains of a furnace

The Roman furnaces in Alcamo are part of the archaeological complex of Alcamo Marina (in contrada Foggia) and were discovered in 2000.

This ancient production centre has international importance, both for its extension and the quality of preservation.

== Discovery and excavation ==
The first furnace was accidentally discovered in 2000 during some excavations for some future building works planned on the spot. After stopping these works, the Faculty of Conservation for Cultural heritage of University of Bologna (seat of Ravenna), the Sicilian Regional Department for Cultural heritage and the Fine Arts Department (Soprintendenza dei Beni Culturali) of Trapani stipulated a Convention and the work of research started. The project manager was professor Dario Giorgetti, the teacher of Roman History and ancient topography at Bologna University, together with some students from the faculty of Ravenna and others from the three-years course of Naval Archaeology of Trapani.

The first inspection, made in 2002 by professor Dario Giorgetti together with dottor Antonio Filippi, showed the presence of the remains of an old furnace from the Roman age, kept quite well, in spite of damage from looting. They made three campaigns of research: October 2003, October 2004 and September 2005. In the last one they found, on the southern side of the area, the remains of the third furnace.

After securing its safety, the site has been opened to public on May 23, 2015 (only for two days), thanks to the agreement between the municipality of Alcamo, the Archeoclub d’Italia Calatub (with its volunteers) and the Monuments and Fine Arts Department (Soprintendenza dei BB.CC.AA.) of Trapani.

On April 26, 2016, an agreement was signed between the municipality of Alcamo and the Archeoclub d'Italia Calatub for the exploitation of the archaeological site by means of maintenance activities, cleaning, accessibility and research facilitation.

== Description ==
The research area, belonging to Alcamo municipality, is located on the Provincial Road (S.P.) 187 very near the bridge on the river San Bartolomeo which marks the boundary between Alcamo and Castellammare del Golfo, and upriver from the railway line Trapani–Palermo in contrada Magazzinazzi.

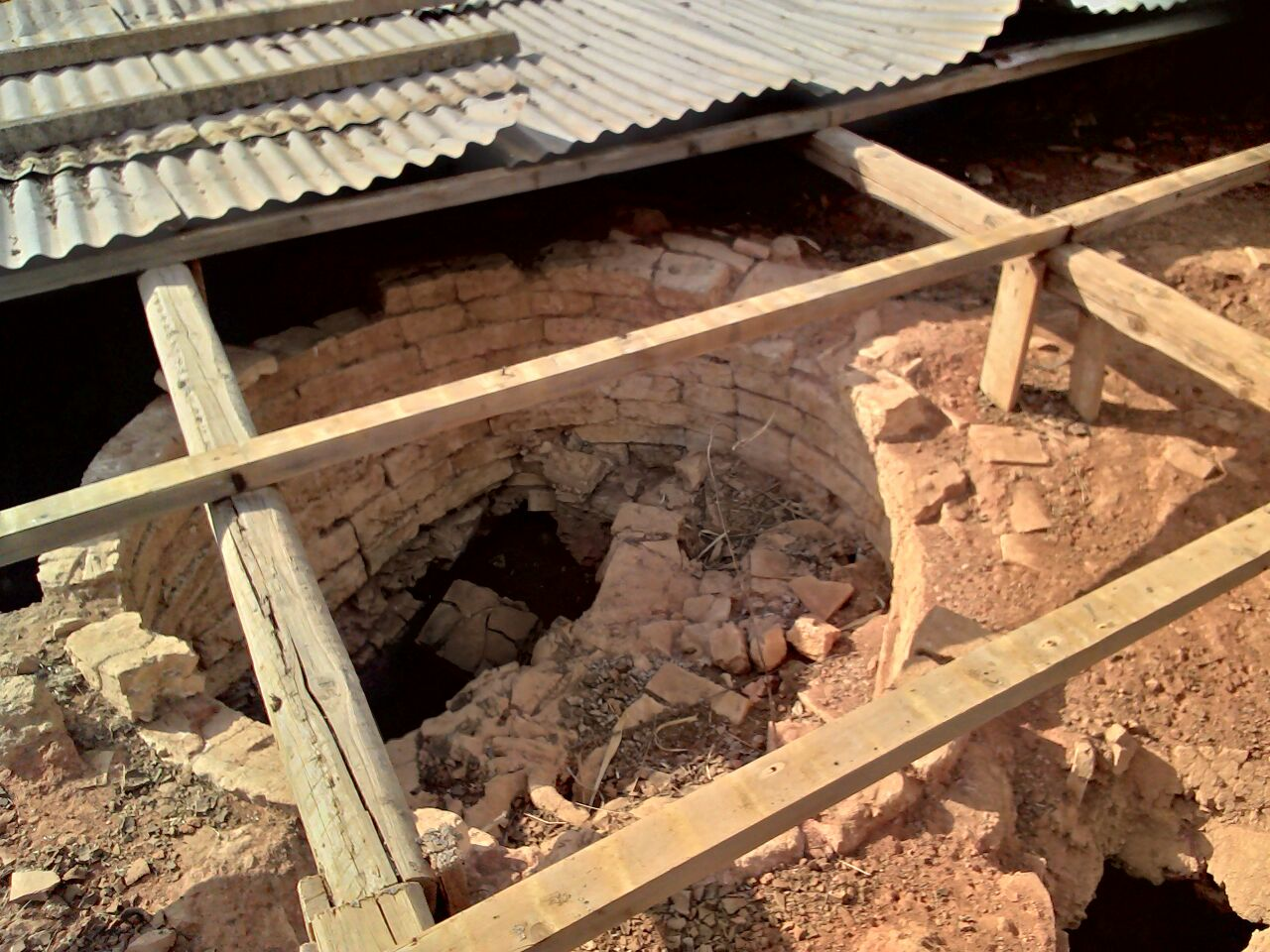
One of the Roman furnaces

The plant in Contrada Foggia covers an area of 2,500 square metres (with about 350 metres already excavated); they have discovered three furnaces, two manufacturing environments and 5 brickwork structures bounding the production plants, made with local calcarenite, detrital stone which is solid and soft while it is processed. The walls are useful to contain the expansion of the earth, due to the heat of the furnaces while working and, above all, during the phases of heating and cooling.

The furnaces, dating back to the 1st century A.D. and half of the 5th century A.D., are arranged in a terraced form, longitudinally on the axis north south, with a diameter of about 3 metres, and besides a cooking surface well maintained, an unusual state of preservation of the calotte-shaped cooking chamber.

Furnace "A" is a type c.d. "muffle" furnace. There are very few examples of this type in Europe, and archaeology scholars maintain an absolute reserve on them. The structure of the "praefurnium" and part of the rectangular corridor (60 centimetres wide and 2.7 metres deep), which served to introduce firewood into the combustion chamber, is clearly visible.

Considering the extent of the production area, scholars think that there must also be ditches for the depuration of clay, with pipes for the water inflow and down flow, and of some workshops with various lines of production, storage and warehouse. Maybe there were about 15 furnaces, but discovering these will need further excavation campaigns. When working, each furnace gave work to eight people, with two or even three for each group, so it is possible that in this area there was a village (whose traces are not yet identified) with about 90 families engaged in the production centre.

Maybe the plant belonged to one or more families of noble entrepreneurs, who passed some periods of time in Sicily in order to control their business. In the furnace “A” they found a bent tile with the stamp Maesi and a cross-shaped sign, dating back to the 5th century A.D., and near Alcamo (in contrada Sirignano) among the ruins of an ancient villa they discovered a tile with the stamp Masi Anae.

The Maesi family was present in the Sicily of the old late Imperial age, with different inscriptions at Termini Imerese, Palermo and Marsala. The Sicilian branch of Maesii originated from Maesius Picatianus, coming from north Italy, who was Augustus’ legate in Numidia. There are also testimonies of Maesii Titani, from Macedonia (ancient kingdom), who had commercial interests both in the West and in the East.

== Suppositions on their utilization ==
Some archaeological studies have proven that there were at least two different phases of utilization during the Roman domination, which led to a progressive restriction of the cooking chamber of the furnaces, after each restoration. Besides, the extension of the excavation on the south-eastern sector, has revealed, year after year, the traces of a second potential structure for the ceramics’ production.

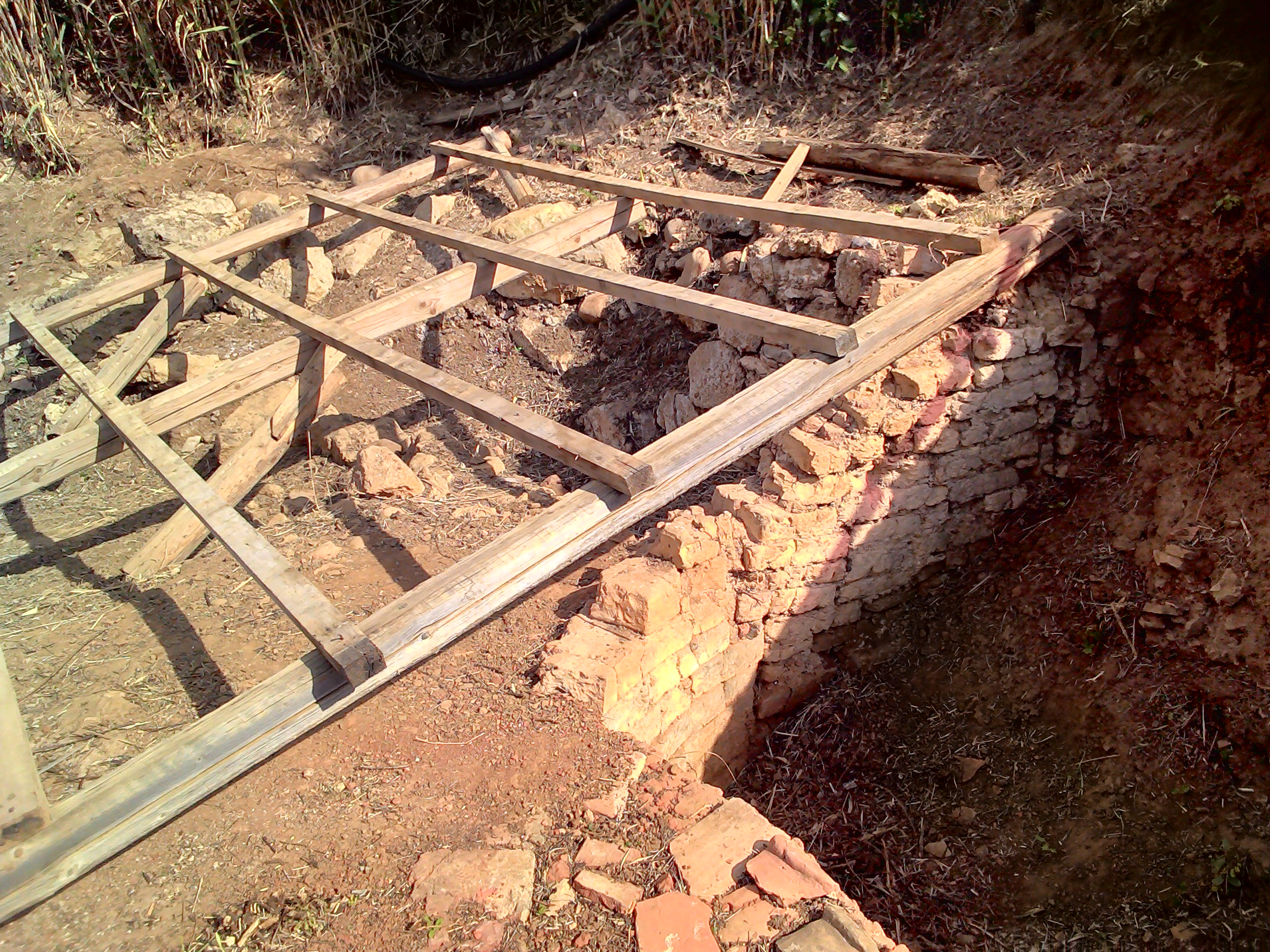
A containing wall in the Roman furnaces in Alcamo

The furnaces were used once for the cooking and production of materials intended for home and building use (dishes, amphoras, tiles and bricks, flat tiles and ordinary ceramics) and they make think of the existence of a productive and handicraft complex strongly connected with the commercial activities of the near port of Castellammare del Golfo, located in a favourable position for the commercial routes of the Mediterranean towards Spain, Sardenia and Rome.

The proximity of the river San Bartolomeo allows to suppose, moreover, the best way of transport for the exportation of the fictile manufactured articles and their contents: in fact, in the chronicles of the 18th century, the river was still shown as a navigable one, in contact with the near Segesta. Its conic delta was due to the detritus and compactions of two streams (the canal Molinello and the river San Bartolomeo), with a considerable presence of a natural clayey deposit and a water spring, both of them necessary for the production of ceramics.

Maybe the amphoras Dressel 21 and Dressel 22 type, discovered in the site, were realized as containers for fruit, but also for the preservation and transport of fish, especially tuna and mackerel, confirming the millenary economic tradition which is attested by the presence of different fish processing plants in the Gulf of Castellammare, at San Vito Lo Capo, Marsala and in the Egadi Islands.

== See also ==
- Geosite Travertino della Cava Cappuccini (Alcamo)

== Bibliography ==
- Giorgetti, Dario (2006). Le fornaci romane di Alcamo : rassegna, ricerche e scavi 2003-2005 / a cura di Dario Giorgetti; prefazione di Antonio Carile; testi di Claudio Capelli ... [et al.]. Rome: Aracne editrice.
- Stoppioni, M.L. (1993). Gli impianti produttivi, in Con la terra e con il fuoco: Fornaci romane del riminese. Rimini: Guaraldi Editore.
- CUOMO DI CAPRIO, N. (1992). Fornaci e officine da vasaio tardo-ellenistiche. Princeton New Jersey: Morgantina Studies.
- Di Piazza, Michele; Orofino, Giacomo A.; Fiori, Cesare (2012). Le fornaci romane di Alcamo. Rassegna, ricerche e scavi 2003-2005 F(a cura di D.Giorgetti). Rome: Aracne. p. 244. ISBN 978-8854805965.
- Giorgetti, Dario; Muro, Xabier Gonzalez (2011). "Le fornaci romane di Alcamo. Rassegna di studi e ricerche 2006/2008. Catalogo dei materiali" a cura di Dario Giorgetti e Xabier Gonzalez Muro. La Mandragora. p. 286. ISBN 978-8875862527.
