= Castle of Ventimiglia =

Castle in Sicily, Italy

- Castello dei Ventimiglia
- Alcamo in Italy
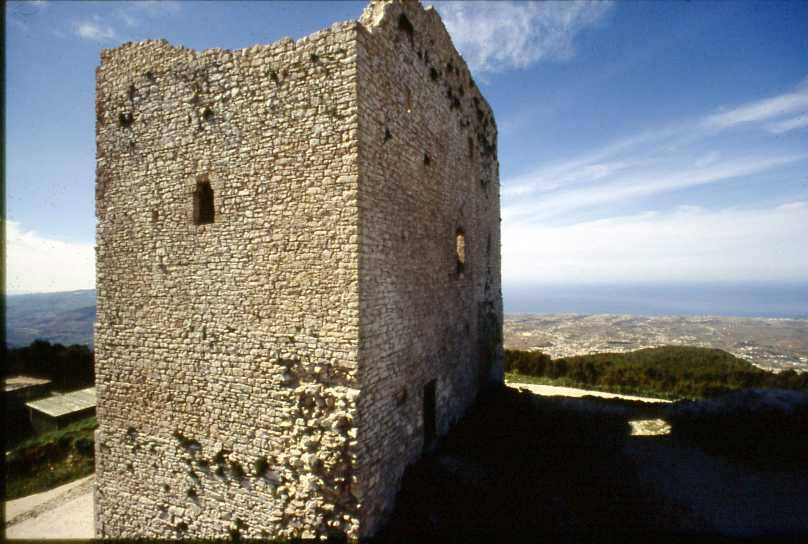
- Remains of Castello di Ventimiglia (the primary tower)

Site information
- Type: Castle

Location
- Coordinates: 37°57′16″N 12°57′51″E

The castle of Ventimiglia (or castle of Bonifato) is an ancient four towers castle which was built at the end of the 14th century by the Ventimiglia family on the top of Mount Bonifato near Alcamo (inside Nature Reserve Bosco di Alcamo), Sicily, southern Italy.

== Historical hints ==
Enrico Ventimiglia, the son of Guarnieri Ventimiglia whom he succeeded to, declared that he had this castle built on Mount Bonifato as a protection from possible attacks. According to different interpretations, the castle, instead, would date back to an anterior period.

The castle was destroyed in 1243 by order of Frederick II; it was rebuilt by the Ventimglia family before 1391 at her own expense. In 1779 the castle's ruins were inserted in the Sicily's Plan for the Preservation of Cultural Assets (Plano di conservazione dei Beni Culturali della Sicilia) by Gabriele Lancillotto Castello, prince of Torremuzza.

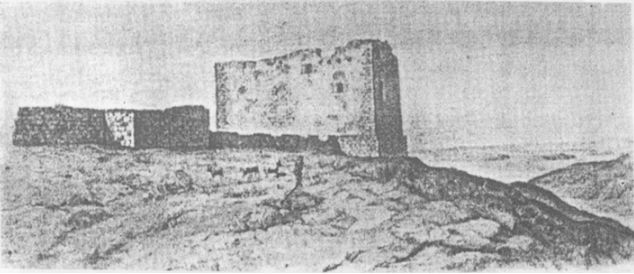
Ruins of the Castle of Ventimiglia in a representation by the prince of Torremuzza (1779).

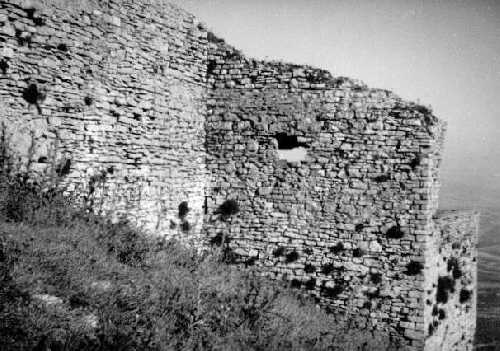
A tract of the western walls and the south-west tower.

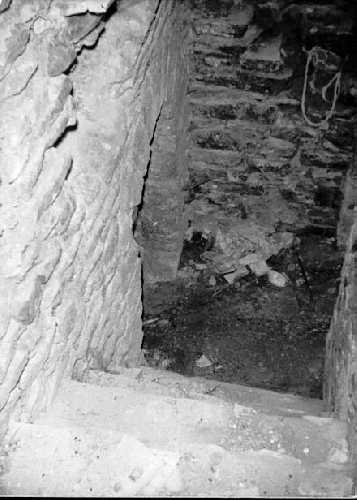
The prisons' entrance.

== Description ==
Originally the castle had four towers and a rectangular trapezoid plan. The only remaining tower is the donjon or "Torre maestram" (improperly called "Saracen tower"), that initially had three floors: you could enter it through a wooden ladder at the first floor. This tower is located on the north-west and had a rectangular plan with walls 2.2 m thick. It was the most important in the castle because, thanks to its impressiveness and position, this was a point of strategic sighting as they could check the road leading to the castle, as far as the entrance door, situated on the south-west side.

The primary tower included four levels:

- on the ground floor there was the cistern for collecting the rainwater and the prisons;
- on the first floor there were two rooms with a vaulted ceiling, one of them had a chimney;
- on the second floor there were two more rooms with a wooden ceiling;
- on the third floor there was a room where they lighted fire signals; its ceiling was probably made with stone.

== See also ==
- Alcamo
- Castle of Alcamo
- Castle of Calatubo

== Sources ==
- Gruppo Archeologico Drepanon (2014). Bonifato - La montagna ritrovata. Trapani: Il Sole editrice. ISBN 978-88-905457-3-3.
