= Geosite Travertino della Cava Cappuccini =

- Cave Orto di Ballo
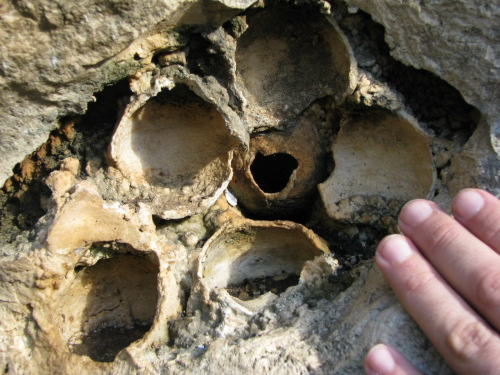
- Fossil eggs of a tortoise

- Location within Italy
- 37°59′08″N 12°57′41″E
- Location: Alcamo, Province of Trapani, Sicily, Italy

Site notes
- Excavation dates: 1984
- Condition: Preserved
- Owner: Public
- Management: Municipality of Alcamo
- Public access: no

The Geosite Travertino della Cava Cappuccini (or Cave Orto di Ballo) is located in Alcamo, in the province of Trapani, in Sicily.

== History ==
Since 2010 the Ministry of the Environment), through l’ISPRA (Superior Institute for the environmental protection and research) had included it in the official list of Italian geosites.

By decree of 1 December 2015, the Regional Department of Land and Environment has established this geosite, recognising it of a Paleontological/Stratigraphic type of worldwide importance. Its area is formed by the wall of a quarry and a narrow strip of land at its beginning.

The travertine quarries were recovered some years ago, thanks to the financing of the European funds of the Por-Fesr 2007/2013. The project of requalification and the realization of an amphitheatre at disposal of the Cittadella dei giovani in the area of Orto di Ballo, had put part of the Paleontological site in danger; after the protests by the citizens' Committee called Difendiamo il Geosito Cave Cappuccini, the original project was modified in November 2014, in order to protect the area.

Among the modifications, there are some works tending to reduce the visual impact of the amphitheatre at the distance of six metres from the quarry’s walls: then the bleachers will lean on the natural slope already existing on the south side.

== Description ==
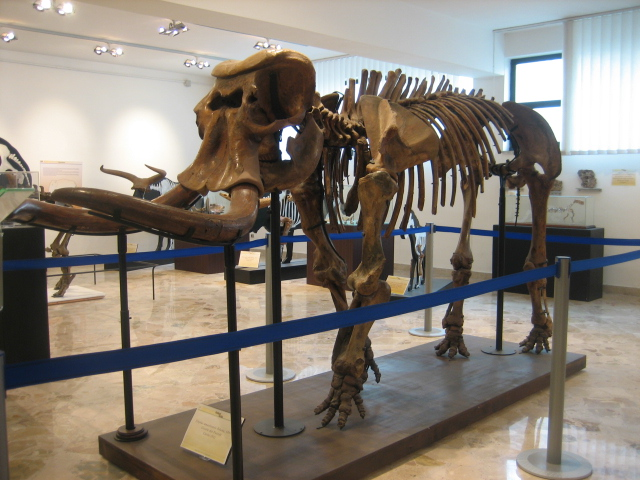
Skeleton of an elephant found in Sicily (Gemellaro Museum)

The cave of travertine Orto di Ballo is a very important site for Paleontology because this travertine dates back to Pleistocene and also for its interesting geologic and geomorphological characteristics; thanks to the great number of fossils discovered, we can reconstruct the geologic events of this area.

At the end of 1984, inside the quarry of the cooperative "Siciltravertino", they found the fossilized shell of a tortoise, Geochelone sp, 1,15 metres long, and some eggs. These two finds are kept at the Museum of paleontology and geology Gaetano Giorgio Gemmellaro in Palermo. The tortoise, also present in the Pleistocene of Malta, recalls those which are still living, in a great number, at Aldabra, a big atoll and protected nature reserve, located near the Seychelles.

In the geosite of Alcamo they have also discovered the skeleton of a dwarf elephant, Elephas falconeri, (with its tusks, teeth and skulls); in 1985 professor Giorgio Belluomini, an expert of the National Research Council, by using the method of Amino acid dating on the fossil’s teeth, discovered that this elephant dates back to 260,000 years ago.

Inside the travertine they have also found some specimens of the giant edible dormouse, red deer, (Cervus elaphus), and wild boar (Sus scrofa), kept at the Civic Museum Torre di Ligny of Trapani.

The site has made possible to establish the right dating of the Elephas in Sicily, as in one of the splits of the travertine, with paleosol inside it, they found the remains of an elephant of average size, the Elephas mnaidriensis, which at first had been wrongly considered the progenitor of the dwarf elephant.

== See also ==
- Alcamo
- Mount Bonifato
- Quarry
- Travertine
- Roman furnaces in Alcamo

== Sources ==
- "gurs regione sicilia" (PDF).
- "La mia tesi".
- "Visit Alcamo". Archived from the original on 2017-04-29.
- "Museo geologico Gemellaro".
- "Alcamo-Ex cave Orto di ballo".
- "Alcamo riaperte le cave orto di ballo".
- "Alcamo nella cava di travertino sorgera la piazza-anfiteatro". Archived from the original on 2018-10-07.
- "Alcamo, oggi alle 16.00 inaugurazione della "Cittadella dei giovani"".
- "Trapani: assessore Sicilia inaugura cave di travertino di Alcamo". Archived from the original on 2017-04-28.
- Gruppo Archeologico Drepanon: Bonifato - La montagna ritrovata; Il Sole editrice, Trapani, 2014; ISBN 978-88-905457-3-3
- Burgio E. e Cani M.: Sul ritrovamento di elefanti fossili ad Alcamo (Trapani, Sicilia) – Il Naturalista Siciliano, Palermo,1988
- Bonfiglio L. e Burgio E., 1992. Significato paleoambientale e cronologico delle mammalofaune pleistoceniche della Sicilia in relazione all’evoluzione paleogeografica; Napoli, Il Quaternario, 1992
- Autori vari: I Travertini di Alcamo: Proposta di Istituzione di un Geosito - a cura di C. Di Patti; Palermo, E. Scalone - Centro Regionale del Restauro, 2006
