= Nature Reserve Bosco di Alcamo =

Nature reserve in the island of Sicily, Italy

Coordinates: 37.9590°N 12.9585°E

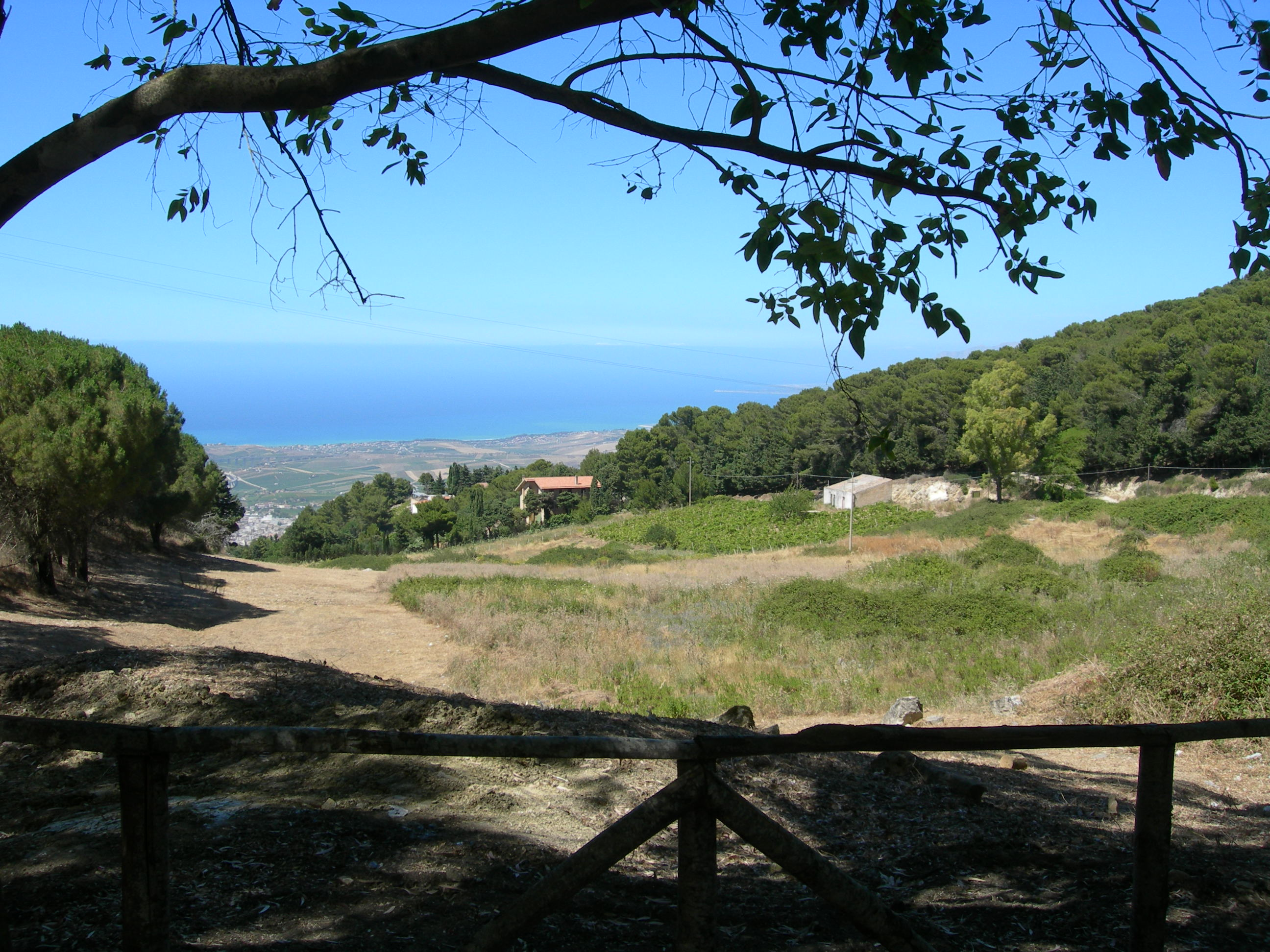
The Nature Reserve Bosco di Alcamo

The Nature Reserve Bosco di Alcamo is a natural protected area of Regione Siciliana established in 1984, and located on the top of monte Bonifato, which dominates the town of Alcamo.

== History ==
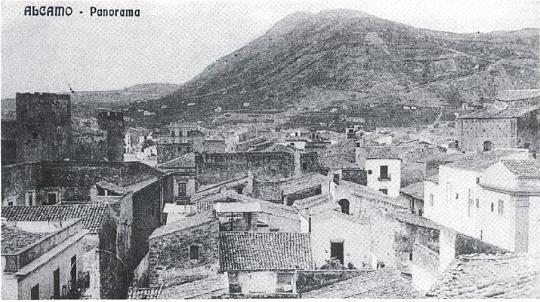
An old photo of Mount Bonifato without its wood.

Until the 19th century the Natural Reserve Bosco di Alcamo was covered with a broad-leaved wood which disappeared because of man's action. Since 1921 it has undergone a reforestation work with& Aleppo'pine, cypress and umbrella pines. Later there was the gradual reappearance of species of local broad-leaved plants. In the recent history wildfires started to become a serious topic in the natural reserve.

=== Fires ===
In June 1998 there where three cases of arson in the area of San Nicola. The hot and dry scirocco wind carried the fire into the reserve and destroyed ten hectares of forest next to the reserve. On the 29th of September there were more fires reported. Further reports claim that fires were extinguished in the mid of October 2014.

== Territory ==
The protected area is dominated by mount Bonifato, a pyramid-shaped calcareous mount 825 metres high s.l.m. near Alcamo, which has an area of 199 hectares. The surrounding landscape is agricultural and with the predominance of vine growing.

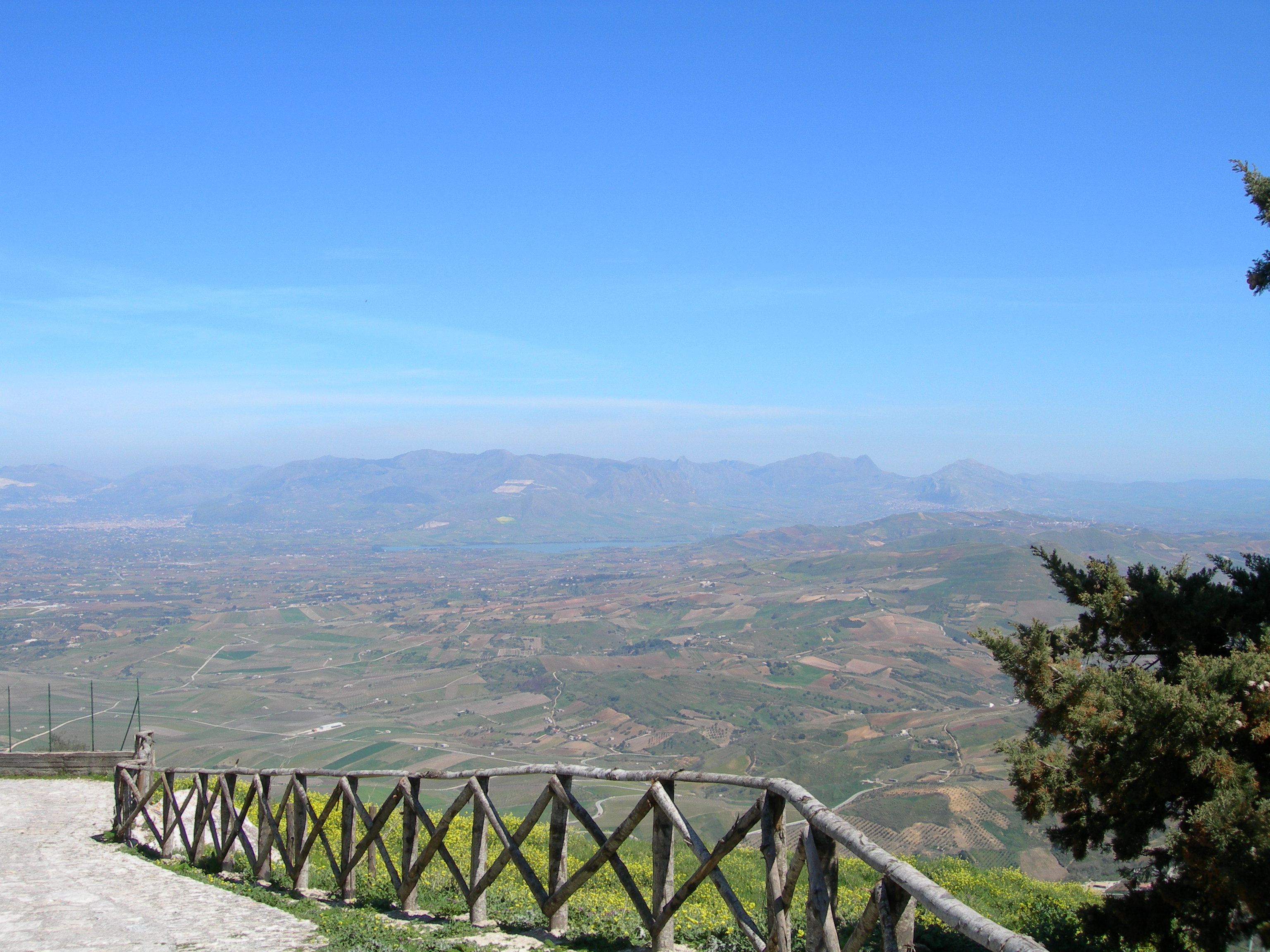
A view from the eastern side of peak

== Flora ==
In ancient times on Mount Bonifato there was a wood which was destroyed by the continuous fires and cutting down of timber. The present forest, deriving from an old reforestation, expands on the northern side of the mountain and it is characterised by the presence of two species of pine, the maritime pine (Pinus pinaster) and Aleppo's pine (Pinus halepensis). There are also poor remainders of evergreen mediterranean forest among the rocks and in some strips of land, not influenced by human activities: the holm oak, the ash tree, and the downy oak, the native essences.

There are also the typical grassland and ampelodesma (or "disa"), which in the past was used to tie vines and realize ropes and baskets. Other important plants for the local handicraft are the Ferula (used for the realization of chairs, stools and small tables), the dwarf palm tree (used to realize brooms or fill in mattresses) Sicilian sumac. used for tanning skins and for dyeing works)[5] and the ash tree (from which they extracted manna).

Besides there is a remarkable presence of Euphorbia, Peony and orchidis (among which visitors can see the rare Orchis commutata and Orchis brancifortii).

There are also different aromatic plants, such as shrubby thyme, Egyptian rue, pennyroyal, rosemary, sage, absinth and oregano.

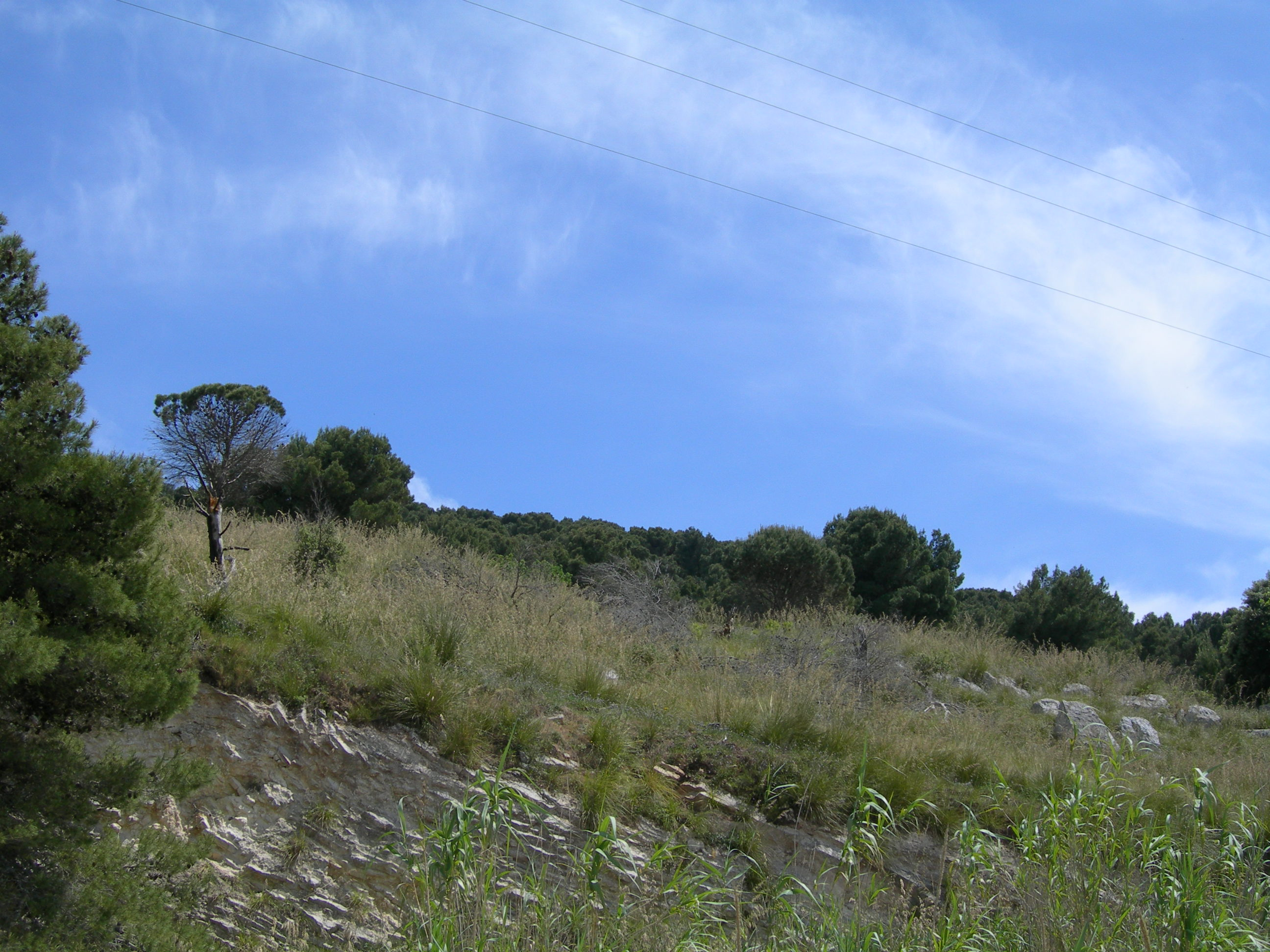
Grassland and ampelodesma

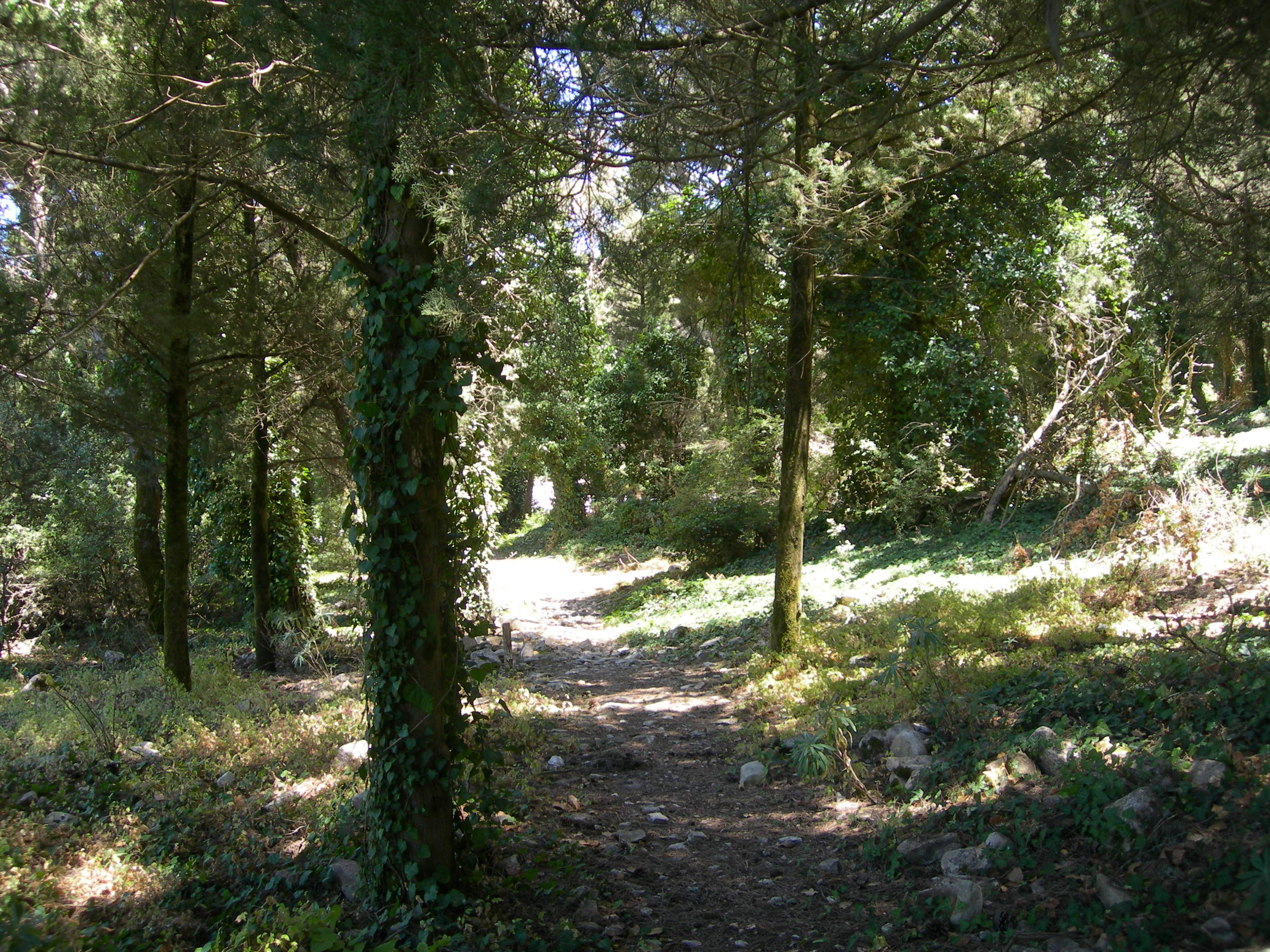
Vegetation inside the wood

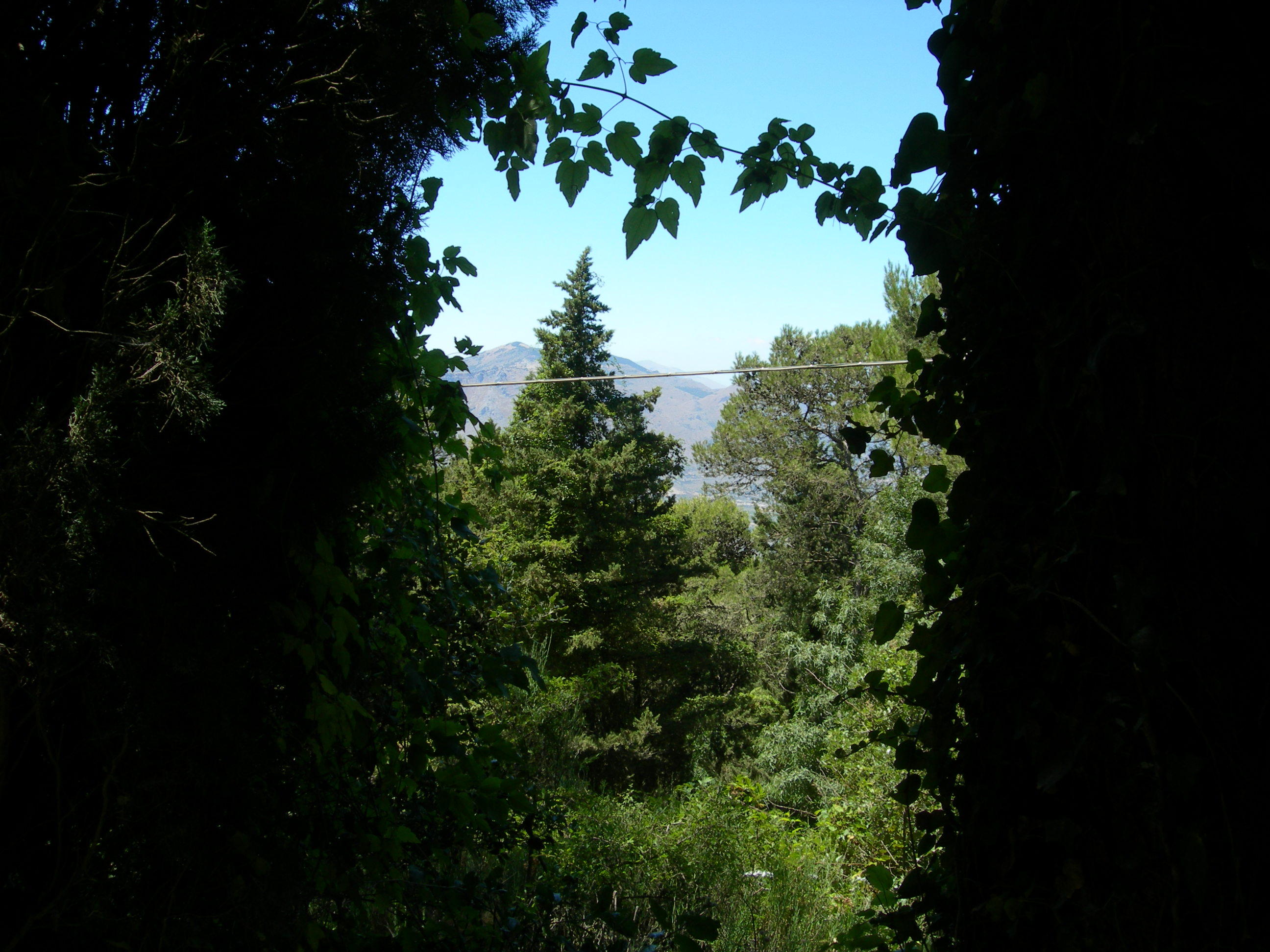
One of the footpaths

== Fauna ==
The forest hosts various kinds of birds such as: woodpigeons, jays, turtledoves, kestrels, thrushs, blackbirds, great spotted woodpeckers, robins, buzzards, woodcocks, great tits, greenfinches, serins, tits and goldfinches.

Among the reptiles are found the rat snake, the endemic common snake (called serpe nivura in dialect), the viper, the lizard and the green lizard.

There are also many mammals such as:porcupines, foxes, weasels, wild rabbits, hedgehogs.

== Historical interest ==
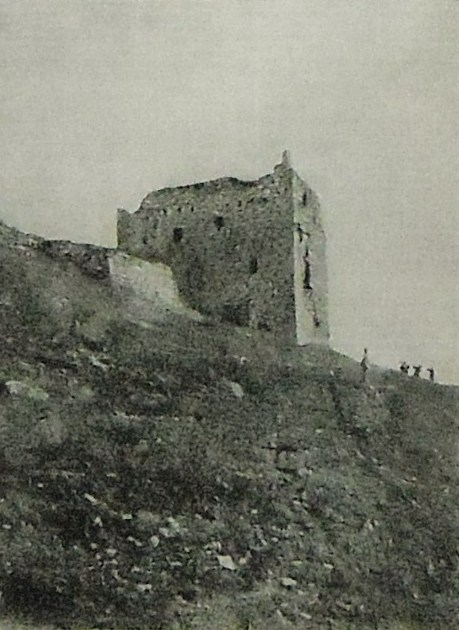
Ruins of the Castle of Ventimiglia

Inside and near the reserve there are remains of historical-cultural interest, among which:

- a necropolis of prehistoric origin
- the Castle of Ventimiglia
- the Queen Gate
- the ruins of the fortified town Bùnifat, with old unicellular buildings, cisterns and snow fields
- the water reservoir la Funtanazza.

== Footpaths ==
The reserve is crossed by 3 footpaths:

- Saint Nicolas' path,1800 metres long
- The Orchidis' path, 850 metres long
- Panoramica Est, 2400 metres long

== Accommodation ==
A building on the edge of the pine wood should carry out an activity of environmental education within the institutive ends of the reserve.

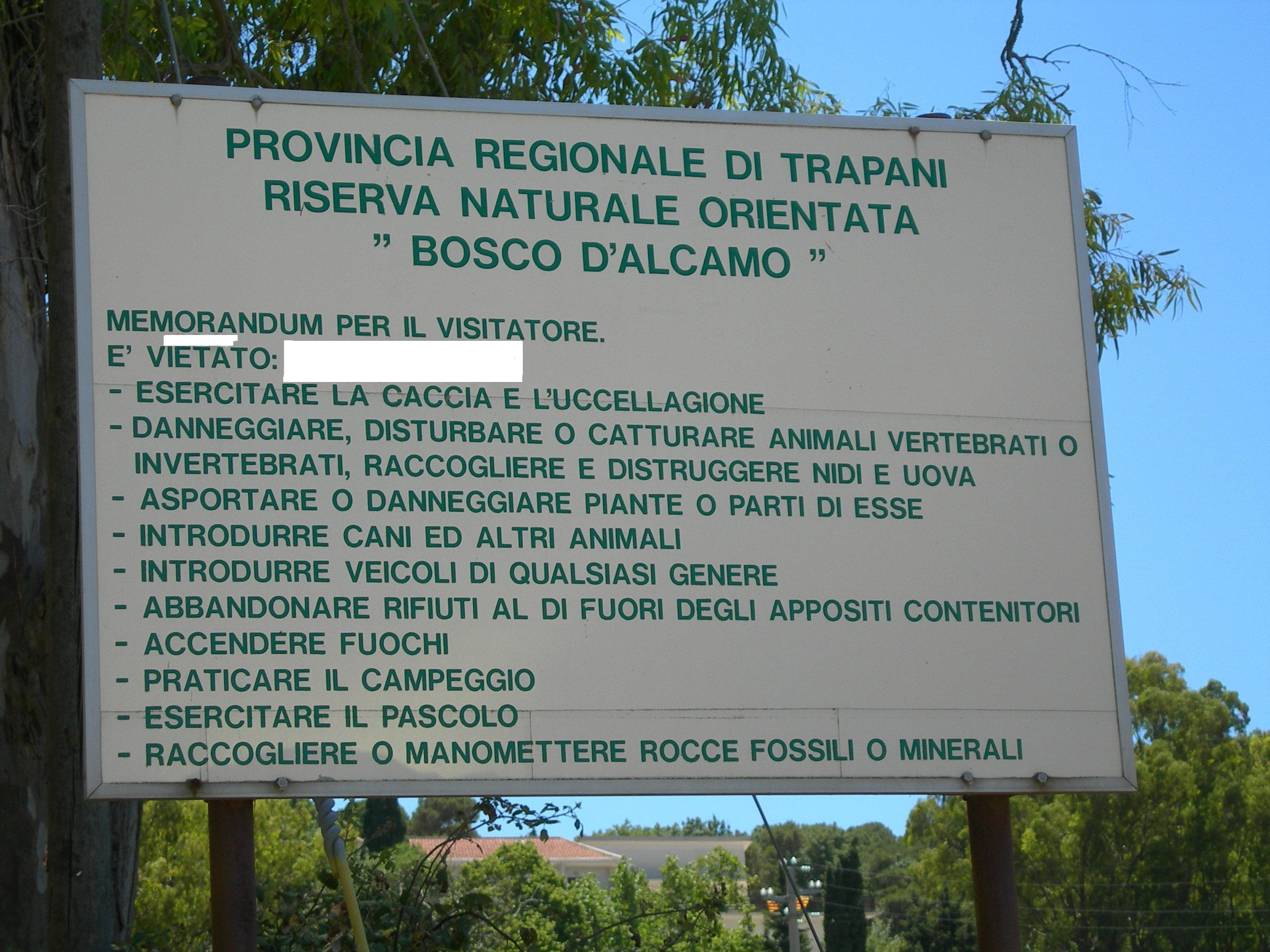
The notice at the entrance of the reserve.

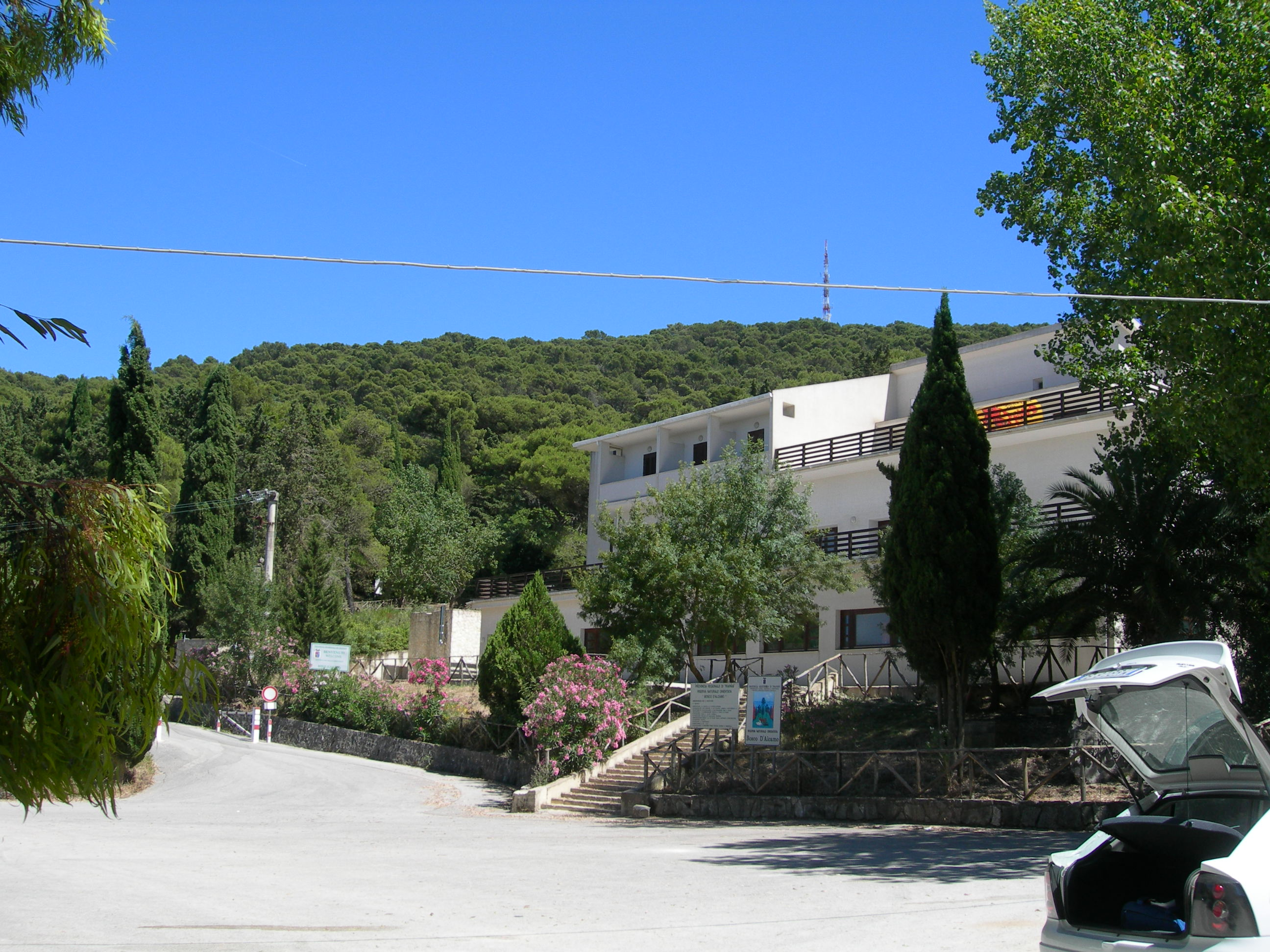
The car park at the entrance of the pine wood.

== See also ==
- Alcamo
- Monte Bonifato
- Aree naturali protette della Sicilia

== Bibliography ==
- Farneti, Gianni (2013). 1000 oasi e parchi naturali da vedere in Italia. Bologna: Rizzoli. ISBN 978-88-586-5373-9.
- Gruppo Archeologico Drepanon (2014). Bonifato – La montagna ritrovata. Trapani: Il Sole editrice. ISBN 978-88-905457-3-3.
