= Mount Bonifato =

Mountain in Italy

- Monte Bonifato (Italian)
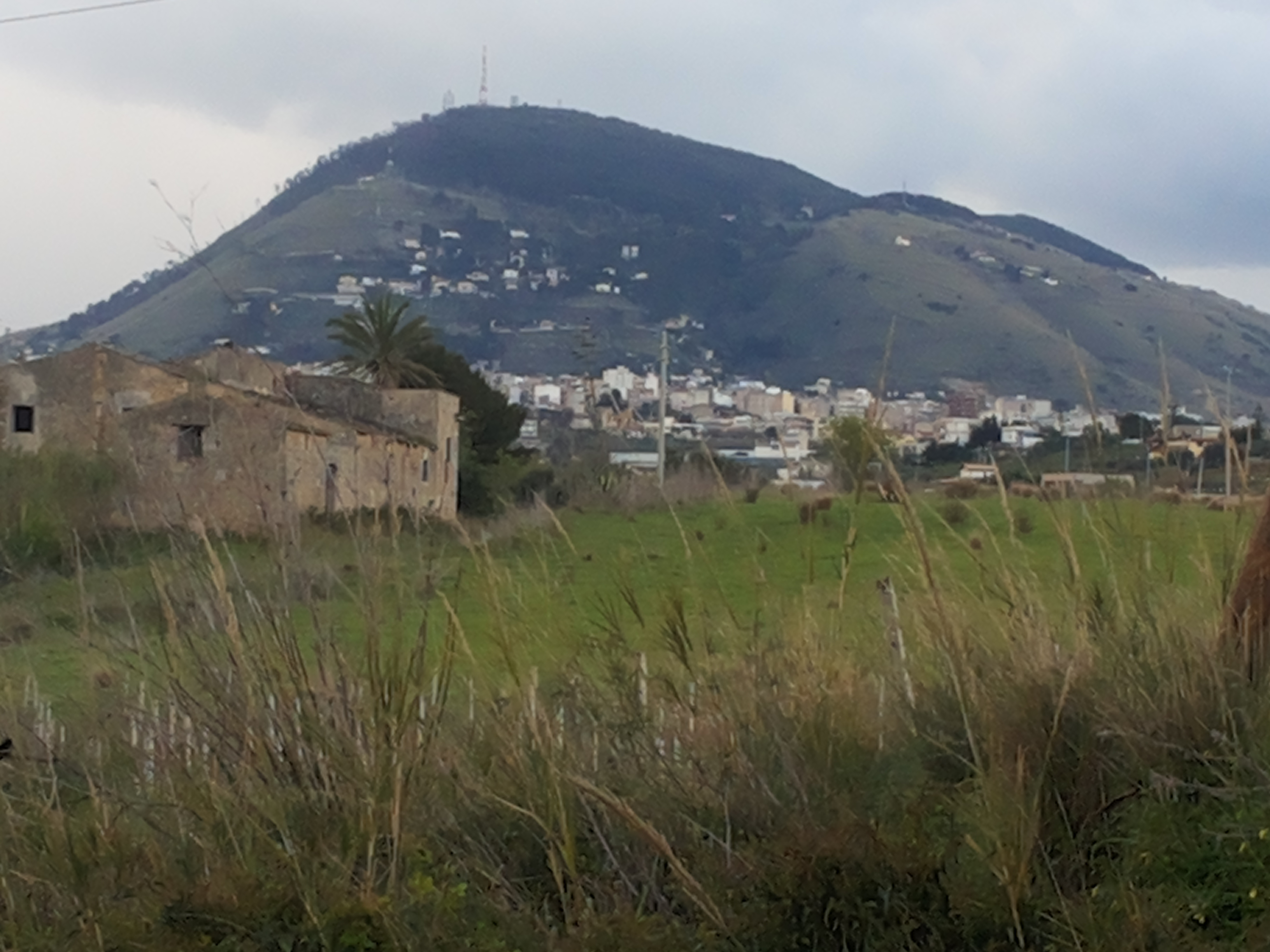

Highest point
- Coordinates: 37°57′N 12°57′E

Geography
- Location within Italy
- Location: Alcamo, Sicily, Italy

Climbing
- Easiest route: by car

Mount Bonifato (825 metres high) is a mountain in north western Sicilly in the province of Trapani.

It is famous for the pine forest and the Nature Reserve Bosco di Alcamo. On its slopes they have found a proto-historic necropolis and traces of an ancient settlement. If you go up to the peak you can see the remains of an old water reservoir (called Funtanazza) and a gate (called Porta della Regina), which implies the existence of surrounding walls. Besides, on the top there are the remains of a castle with four towers, that was built at the end of the 14th century by the Ventimiglia family, feudal lords of the territory of Alcamo for a certain period.

== Territory ==
Mount Bonifato is located in the hinterland of Golfo di Castellammare, between the valley of Fiume Freddo (a river on the west) and Fiume Jato (a river on the east).

It shows quite steep faces on the south, while the declivity is more gradual in the northern part of the mountain, in proximity of Alcamo.

Until the first decades of the 19th century the mountain was covered with an oak wood of ilex and downy oak. In the thirties they began a massive reforestation prevalently with Aleppo's pine that is the prevailing essence nowadays. The access to the mount and the Nature Reserve is provided by a town street: Via per monte Bonifato. Along this road there is a large number of holiday houses, especially concentrated between the fourth and fifth hairpin bend from the valley floor, and it is illuminated for a large part of its course (with the exception of the last mile, before the entrance into the Reserve area).

From the peak you can admire a landscape with the mountains of Palermo on the east and the island of Marettimo in the west; on clearer days you can also see Ustica in the north and mount Cammarata in the south-east.

== Geology ==
The stratigraphy of Mount Bonifato is quite complex as this mountain is made up of many layers of rock, dating back to geological periods. They have found, in particular, the following formations:

- Formation Sciacca (Norian-Rhaetic)
- Formation Inici (Hettangian-Sinemurian)
- Formation Buccheri (Liassic superior-Tithonian inferior)
- FormationLattimusa (Tithonian superior-Valanginian inferior)
- Formation Hybla (Aptian–Albian)
- Formation Amerillo (Cretaceous superior–Oligocene inferior)
- Formation Bonifato (Oligocene superior)
- Calcareniti of Corleone (Burdigalian–Langhiano)
- Marls of San Cipirello (Langhiano superior-Tortonian inferior)
- Colluvium(Holocene).

From the idrogeological point of view, there are a deep aquifer in correspondence with the Triassic limestones, a superficial one near the peak and secondary aquifers in correspondence with the layers of debris.

== Paleontology ==
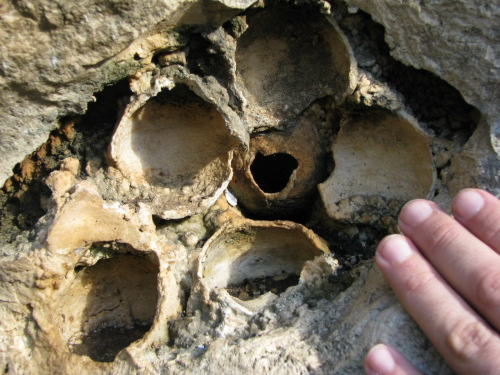
Tortoise's fossil eggs inside the travertine of Alcamo

Between the mountain and Alcamo there is an imposing bank of travertine dating back to Pleistocene which has been exploited nearly all to get slabs for the building industry. However the quarries are also an important site for paleontology because they have found important fossils there.

In particular inside one of these quarries (now Geosite Travertino della Cava Cappuccini (Alcamo)), they have found remains (a natural cast of the brain, defences and molar teeth) of the dwarf elephant, Elephas falconeri, the spheric eggs and the fossilized armour of a big tortoise (Geochelone sp.). These last two fossil findings are kept at Museo paleontologico e geologico di Palermo "Gaetano Giorgio Gemmellaro". The site has also allowed to re-establish the correct "stratigraphy" of the Elephas in Sicily because, in a fracture of travertine filled with "paleosuolo" (then more recently than travertine itself), they have found the remains of a medium size elephant, the Elephas mnaidriensis, which had been wrongly considered the dwarf elephant's ancestor.

Inside Alcamo travertine they also discovered specimens of giant dormouse, Cervus elaphus e Sus scrofa, hosted at the Civic Museum of Prehistory "Torre di Lignì" in Trapani.

Alcamo travertine quarry, where they have found different remains of paleontological importance, has been menaced by a project for the construction o fan amphitheatre whose works were assigned in June 2014, and modified afterwards (in November 2014) so that this paleontological site will be partly protected.

== Historical hints ==
=== Origins ===
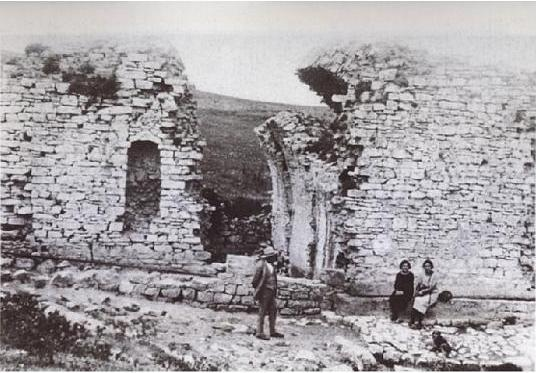
An old photo of the ruins of Funtanazza, before being subjected to the further decay.

In ancient times there was a fortified town on Mount Bonifato, in fact they have found different specimens.

With the passing of time, this town has passed different phases of population and depopulation and for a long time it was inhabited simultaneously with Alcamo (which stands at the foot of the mount), before its disappearing. In particular, it was inhabited since the last part of the Bronze Age, and Elyms, Romans and Byzantines settled there.

From the quotations by Licofron, we know that in ancient times this residential area was called Longuro. With the same name they also indicated the mount, which according to other suppositions was also called "Aereo" and "Longarico" (corresponding to the Latin name of Longuro).

The old town was defended by a wall on three sides and was composed by unicellular houses (that is having a single room). Among the remains of the old town there is the “Funtanazza”, an ancient architectonic work which probably was a water reservoir; according to other people, it was, on the contrary, a thermal plant. The Funtanazza has a rectangular shape with pillars sustaining a barrel vault, similar to the moorish fountains on the northern coasts of Africa.

=== Medioeval period ===
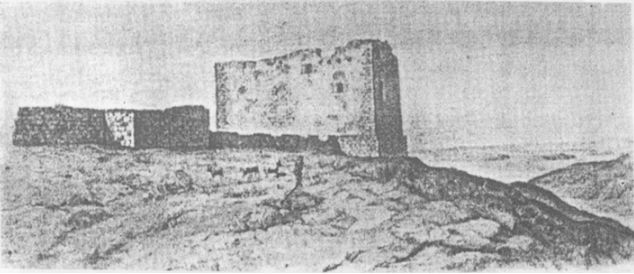
Ruins of the Castle of Ventimiglia in a description by the Prince of Torremuzza (1779)

It dates back to 1182 a document about land grants in which this residential area appears with the name "Bonifato" (or Bùnifat or Bonifacio), from the name of the Roman knight who became its owner. In 1243, owing to an order given by Frederick II, after some cases of rebellion, there was an event of depopulation, but in 1333 it was repopulated under Frederick III’s rule. Since 1340 it was a possession of the baron Raimondo Peralta and later of Guarnieri Ventimiglia.

The son Enrico Ventimiglia succeeded Guarnieri Ventimiglia: he declared that he had the castle of Ventimiglia (or castle of Bonifato) built as a protection from possible attacks. According to some different interpretations, the castle would date back, on the contrary, to a previous period.

In 1243 the castle was destroyed by order of Federico II, and rebuilt in 1391 by the Ventimiglia family at their own expense. Bonifato was definitively abandoned in 1338; its inhabitants finally settled in Alcamo because of the difficulty of getting there and the distance from the road network. In 1779 the ruins of the castle were inserted in the Piano di conservazione dei Beni Culturali della Sicilia (Preservation Plan of the Cultural Heritage of Sicily) by Gabriele Lancillotto Castello, Prince of Torremuzza.

== Archeological research ==
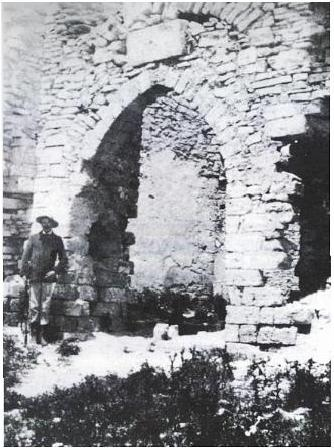
An old photo of Porta Regina (the Queen's Gate).

Since the second half of the 16th century Mount Bonifato has already been explored by scholars who identified different archaeological sites on the mountain, such as the ruins of the old residential area, discovered by the scholar Tommaso Fazello.

The archaeological remains on Mount Bonifato were subjects of research by the historians Ignazio de Blasi (18th century) and Vincenzo di Giovanni (19th century).

At the Regional Archeological Museum Antonio Salinas there are also some lanterns and stamps of bricks dating back to the Roman age, collected on Mount Bonifato by Pietro Maria Rocca during the 19th century. Several archaeological excavations have later been made on this mount, revealing finds dating back to the Middle Ages and remains of very ancient settlements, such as a house of the 6th-7th century A.D. and fragments of ceramics and bronze now exhibited at the museum Baglio Anselmi of Marsala.

Since the first excavations on Mount Bonifato, they have discovered some tomb caves, without any findings inside them, as they were reused by local farmers in later periods. During the following digs, they discovered the ruins of an ancient gate, called The Queen's Gate.

During the last years the excavations have been done within some school-camps organized by Legambiente (1996), Archeoclub of Trapani-Erice (2000), LIPU (2001) and Gruppo Archeologico Drepanon (from 2007 to 2010, inside an iniziative called "Progetto Bunifat").

== Places of religious interest ==
The Sanctuary of Most Holy Mary of the Height was built in the 16th century by three friars (Antonino La Melodia, Vito Faraci e Giuseppe La Chelba), after the founding of an icon of Our Lady dating back to a previous period (later missing) which had been buried under the walls. During the same century of its construction, the Church was a place of pilgrimages (called "Vie Sacre") by the believers arriving at the sanctuary as a sign of penance or to ensure the arrival of the rains.

The Church was rebuilt in 1930; inside it you can see a wooden statue made in 1933 by Giuseppe Ospedale and a painting on metal by Liborio Mirabile. In honour of Our Lady of the Height they celebrate the festivity on September 8 and they prepare large bonfires or "luminari" (during the eve), the celebration of Masses, the procession and the recital of poems in dialect.

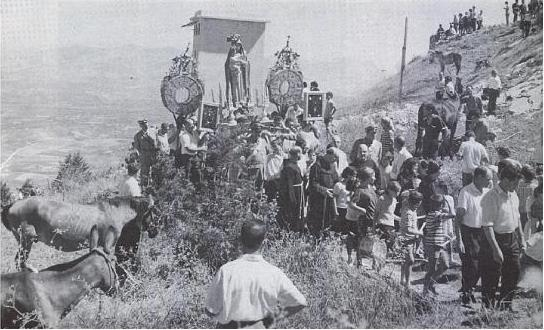
Procession in honour of Our Lady of the Height (about 1960).

== Man’s intervention ==
Owing to the reforestation activities and the installation of TV repeaters (one of them is even placed on one of the three towers of the castle), a lot of signs of the past have got lost on Mount Bonifato, such as:

- The snowfields, that is special pits where they collected snow, whose water was considered miraculous as it melt;
- The caves, among which Polifemo or the eagles’ cave, where they said once these birds of prey lived.

== Sport events ==
On Mount Bonifato they have performed 13 editions of a car race, whose finish line was the yard in front of Funtanazza: in 2010 this sport event has resumed after several years. Mount Bonifato has also been the place of some cycling races, such as the III Gran Prix of Cycling in the province of Trapani (2012).

== See also ==
- Alcamo
- Alcamo Marina
- Nature reserve Bosco di Alcamo
