= Castellammare =

Castellammare may refer to one of the following places:

- Castellammare, Palermo, an ancient quarter of the historic center of Palermo, Sicily
  - Castello a Mare or Castellammare, an ancient fortress which is the namesake of the district
- Castellammare, Los Angeles, a neighborhood in Pacific Palisades, California
- Castellammare di Stabia, a commune in Napoli province, Campania region
- Castellammare del Golfo, a town in Trapani province, Sicily, noted for being the birthplace of many prominent American Mafia figures
- Castellammare Adriatico, former Italian municipality of Abruzzo region, annexed in the territory of Pescara in 1927
- Gulf of Castellammare, a bay in Sicily
