= Scopello, Trapani =

Scopello
- Frazione
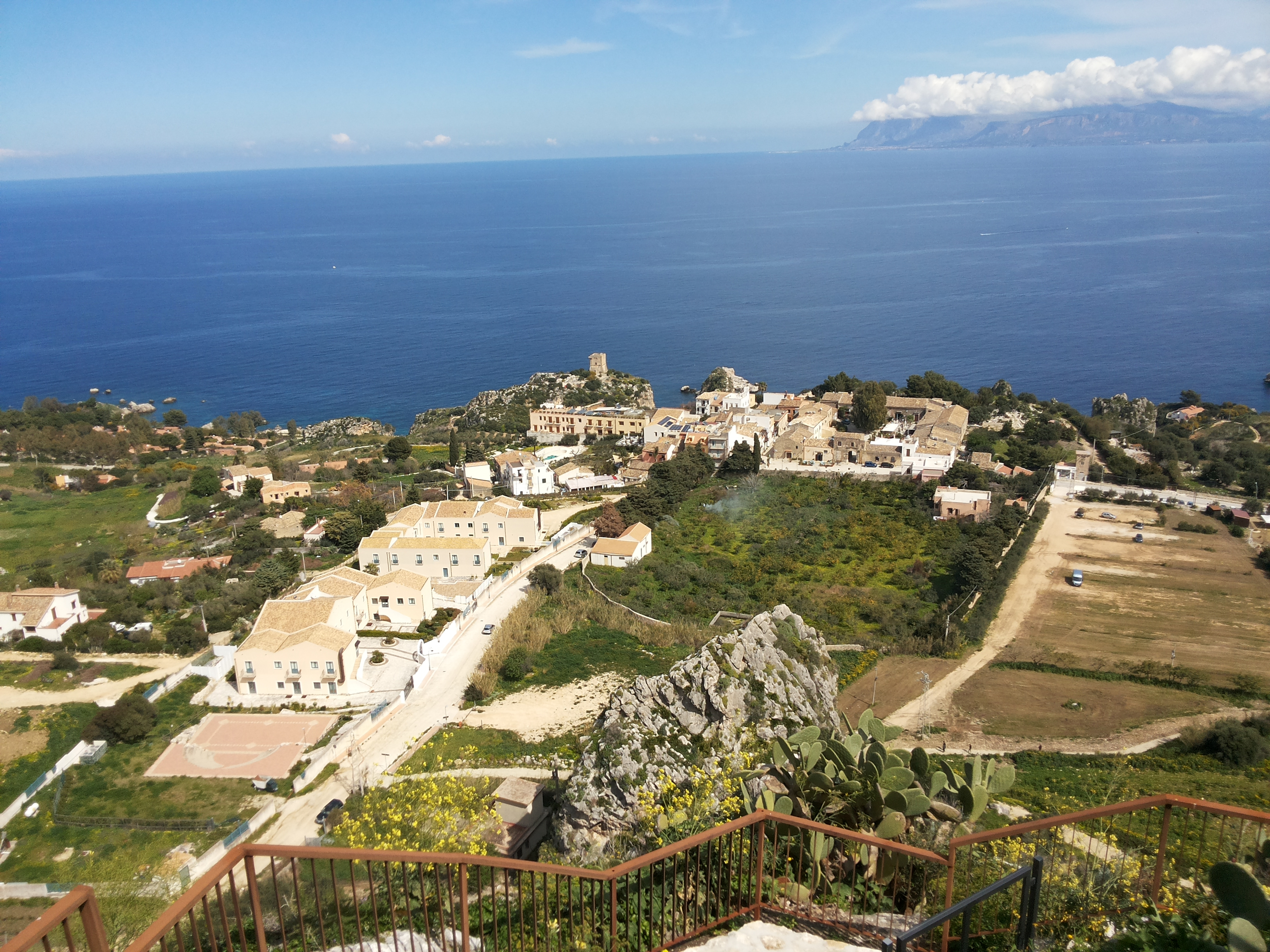
- Panorama of Scopello

- Location of Scopello in Italy
- Coordinates: 38°04′13″N 12°49′05″E
- Country: Italy
- Region: Sicily
- Province: Palermo (PA)
- Comune: Castellammare del Golfo
- Elevation: 106 m (348 ft)

Population (2001)
  - Total: 118
- Demonym: Scopellesi
- Time zone: UTC+1 (CET)
  - Summer (DST): UTC+2 (CEST)
- Postal code: 90014
- Dialing code: (+39) 0924

Scopello is a coastal village in the municipality of Castellammare del Golfo, in the province of Trapani, Sicily, Southern Italy. It is located on the north-western coast of the Sicilian island.

The village stands in an area inhabited by man since the Mesolithic. The ancient Greeks colonized the place and made it a trading settlement. The seaside borough as it appears today dates back to the 17th century.

Scopello has become a major tourist destination in the region for its natural heritage, which includes its famous sea stacks and a section of the Zingaro nature reserve. It is also known for its 13th-century tuna fishery, one of the oldest in Sicily.

== Territory ==
The village rose around a little baglio which is 10 kilometres from Castellammare del Golfo. Its inhabitants are 118, but in summer they become about 2,000. Near it there are the Riserva naturale dello Zingaro (Nature Oriented Reserve lo Zingaro) and Scopello’s stacks (the Faraglioni) with the adjoining tonnara. Its name probably derives from the words stacks or rocks (scopulus in Latin and scopelos in Greek). At few kilometres from the baglio there is Guidaloca, a bay bounded by "Pizzo della Gnacara" and la "Puntazza". Inside it you will find an arc-shaped large beach, formed by pebbles, 400 metres long. West of the “cala”(a bay) there is a cylindrical tower dating back to the 16th century, placed to guard that part of coast.

== History ==
The first settlement dates back to the Hellenistic Era, and continued through the Roman and Islamic Ages. During the Norman period it was a Crown property. In the 13th century the emperor Frederick II of Swabia granted Scopello’s land to Oddone de Camerana, a Piedmontese, and to the Lombard knights who arrived in Sicily with him. In 1237 Oddone di Camerana and his Lombard knights moved to Corleone, and the emperor gave Scopello as a feud to the town Monte San Giuliano (now Erice). The present village dates back to the 17th century and is divided into two parts: a baglio, which is assigned to the Norman period, but dating back to the 18th century, and a small square with the Church of Santa Maria delle Grazie (Our Lady of Graces), a parish since 1961, together with a few houses. Ferdinand II of Bourbon chose the area of Scopello, with its near wood, as the royal hunting reserve, visiting it twice, in 1830 and 1859. After the unity of Italy, it was bought at very low prices by some members of Mafia of Castellammare del Golfo who had supported the unification cause and then sold these lands at market price.

=== When to go ===
As Scopello is a seaside resort, the touristic period is from April to October, but in winter you can also visit it together with attractions such as: Castellammare del Golfo, Calatafimi-Segesta, Alcamo, Riserva naturale dello Zingaro, Erice, San Vito Lo Capo.

=== The Tonnara ===
The tonnara of Scopello is one of the most important and oldest ones in Sicily: the first buildings date back to the 13th century; the proper tonnara was built in the 15th century by Giovanni Sanclemente and enlarged by the Sanclemente family during the 16th century. Later it passed to the Society of Jesus and finally to the Florio family. In the last years, the Tonnara becomes popular with tourists from all over the world, especially since the location became the backdrop of some international movies and tv series productions.

== Images ==
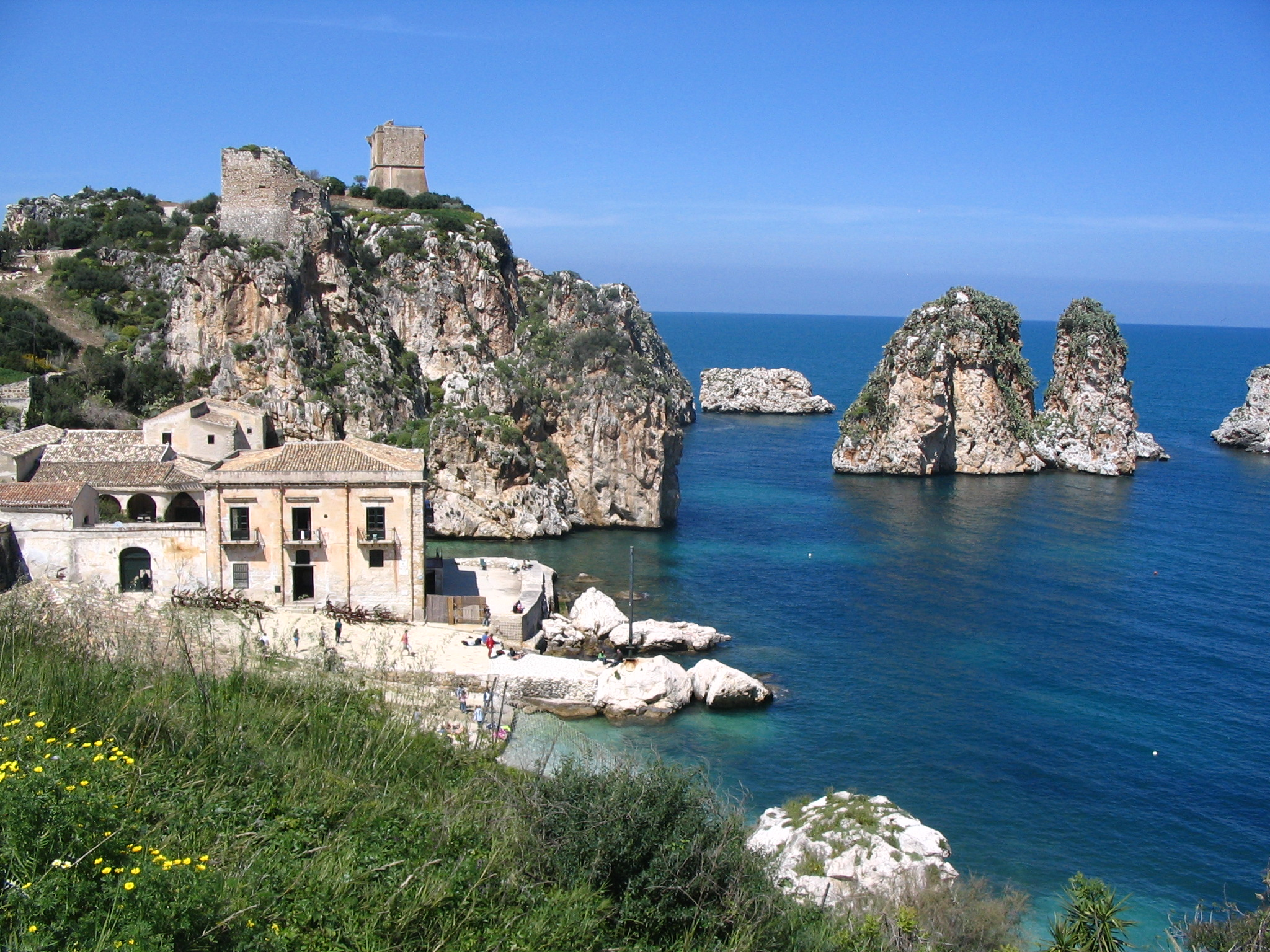
The stacks and tonnara of Scopello

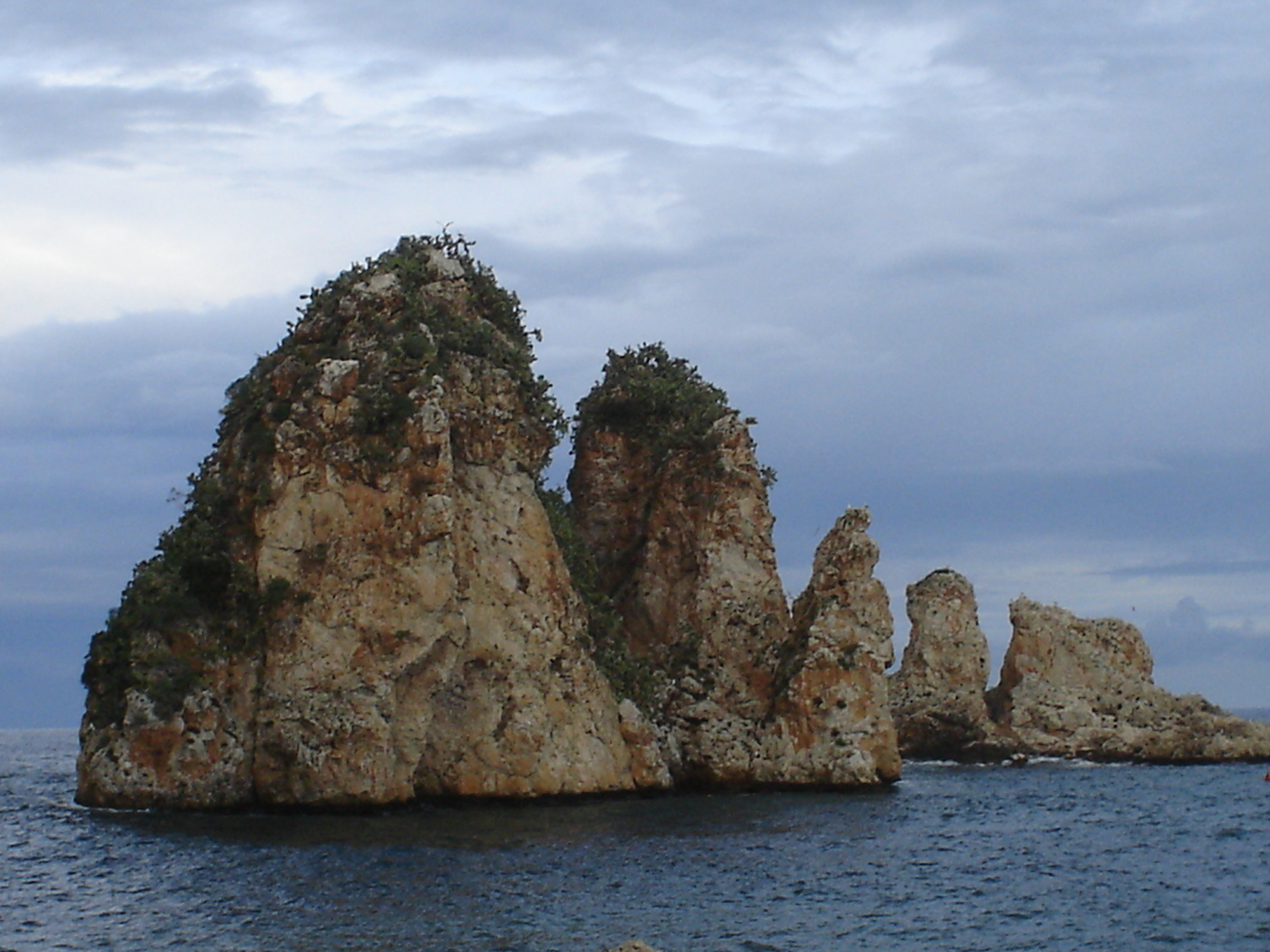
The stacks of Scopello

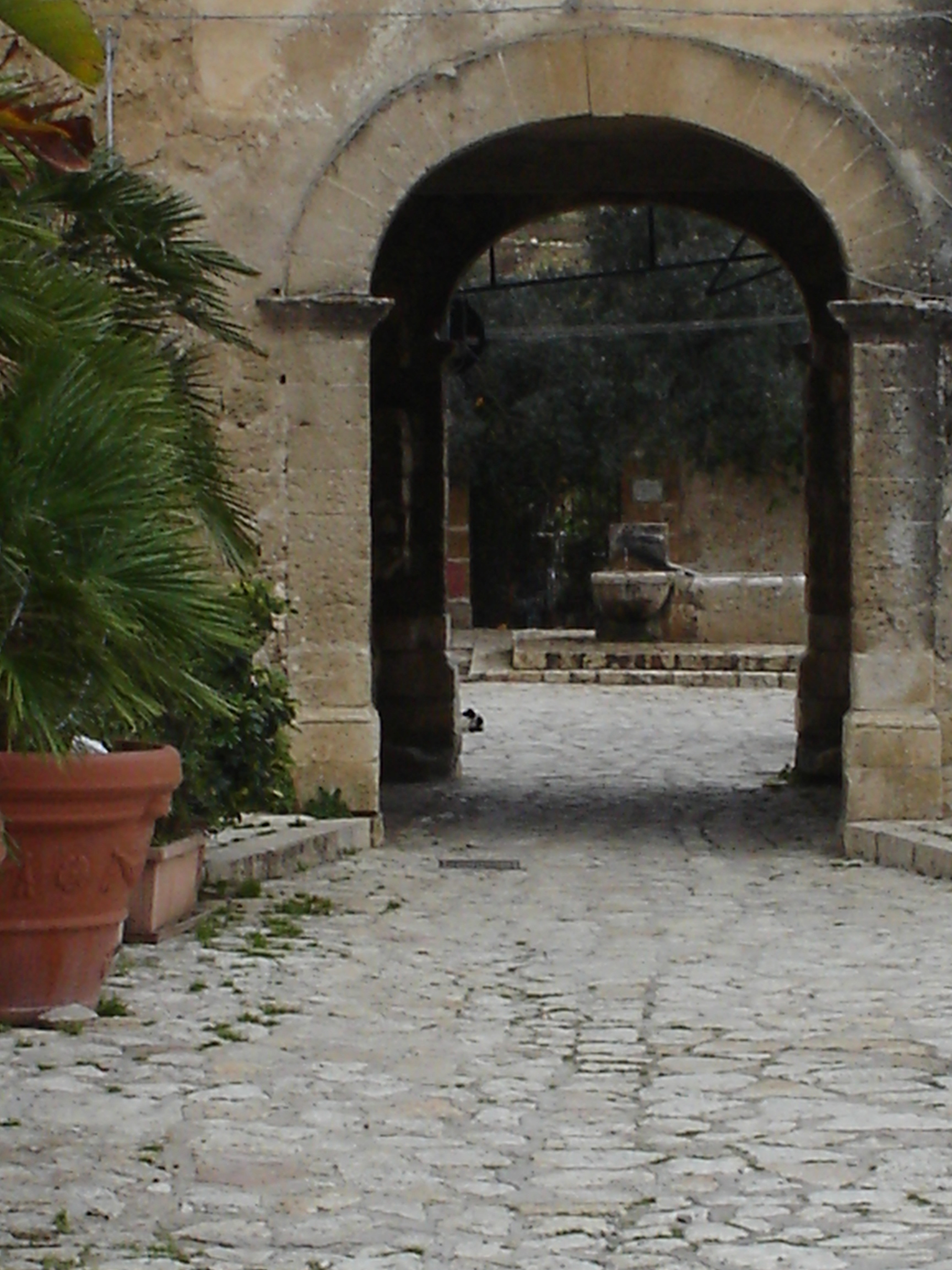
The entrance to Scopello's baglio

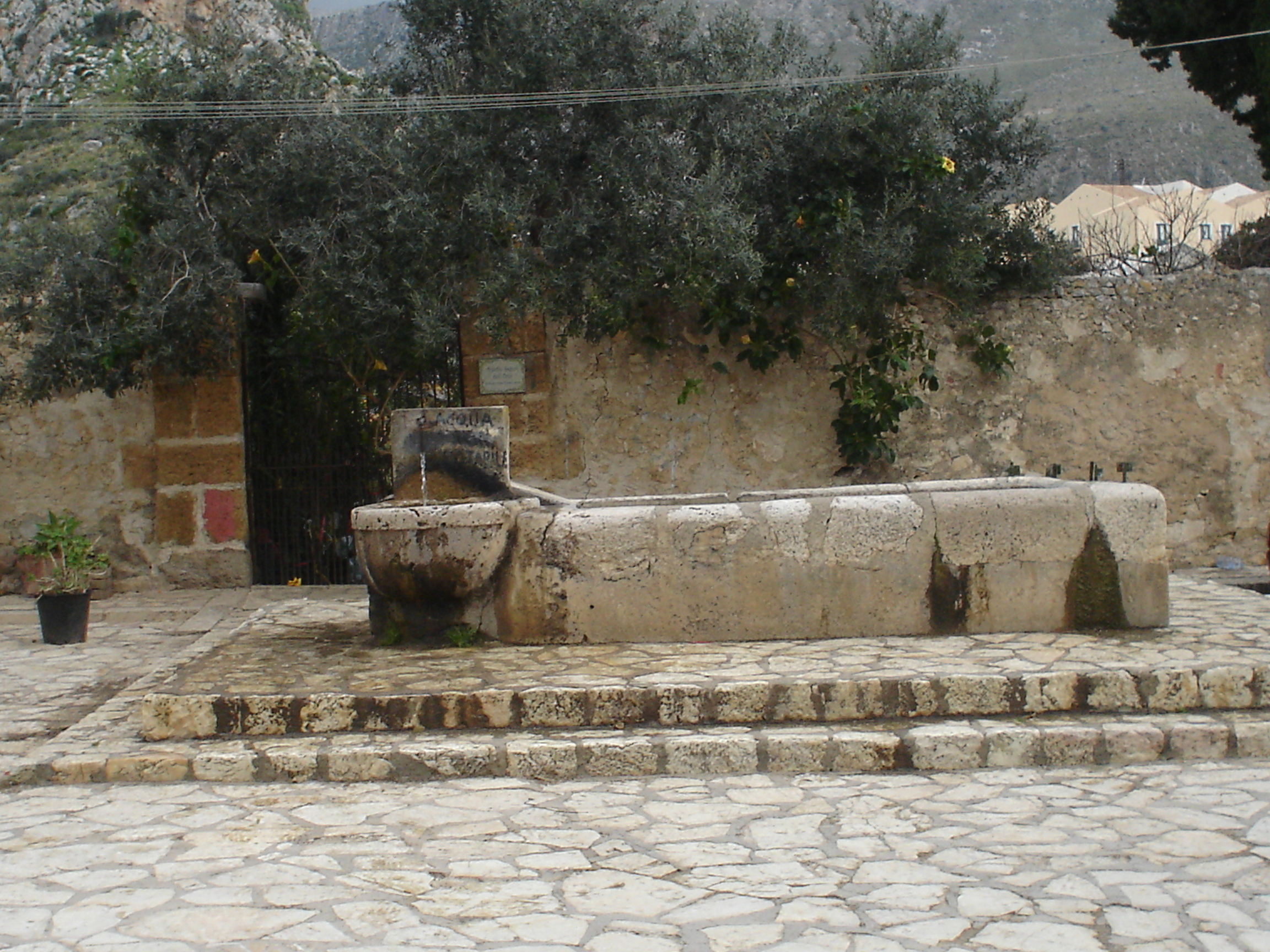
The watering hole near the baglio

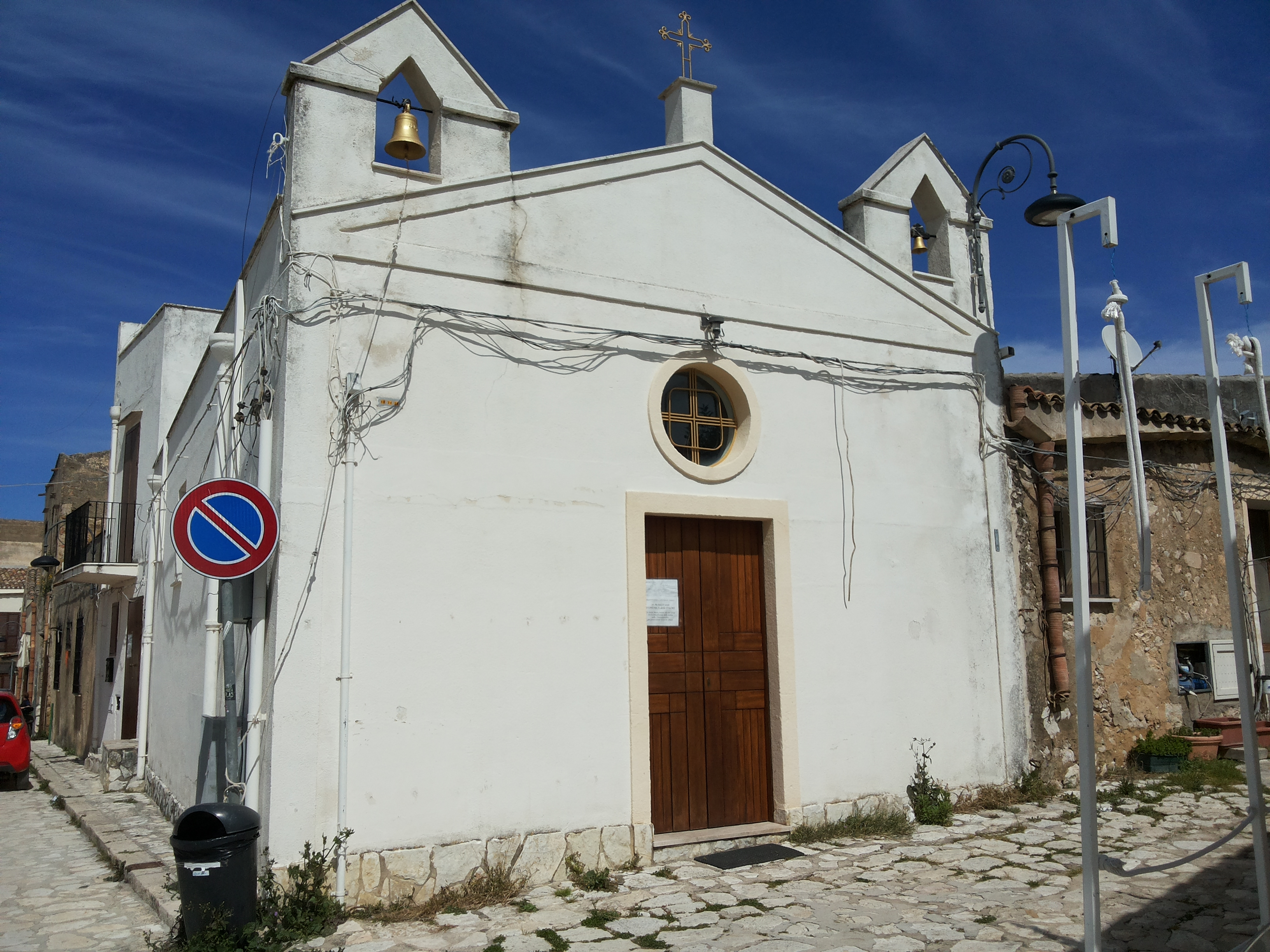
The small church of Scopello

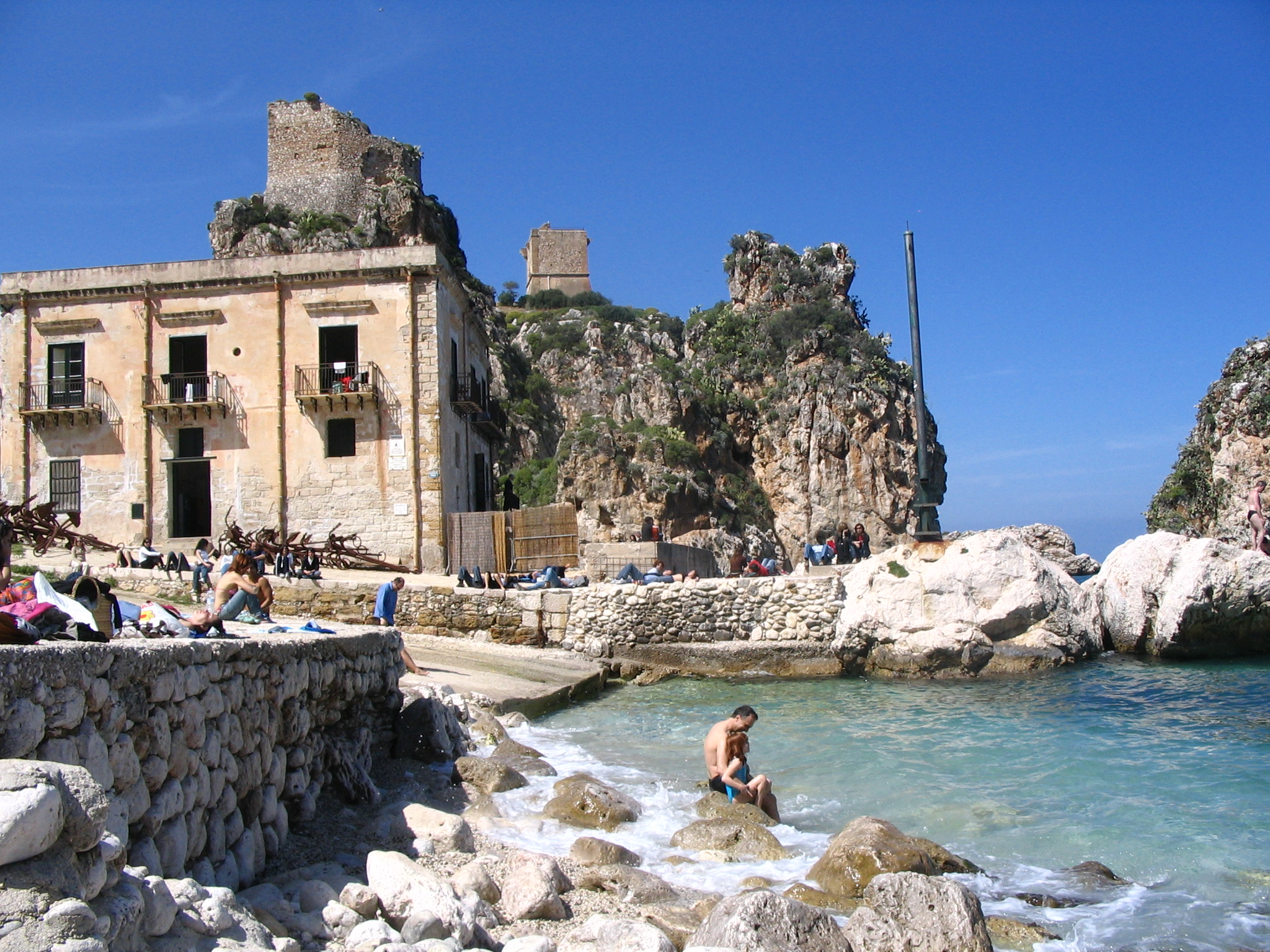
The "tonnara" of Scopello

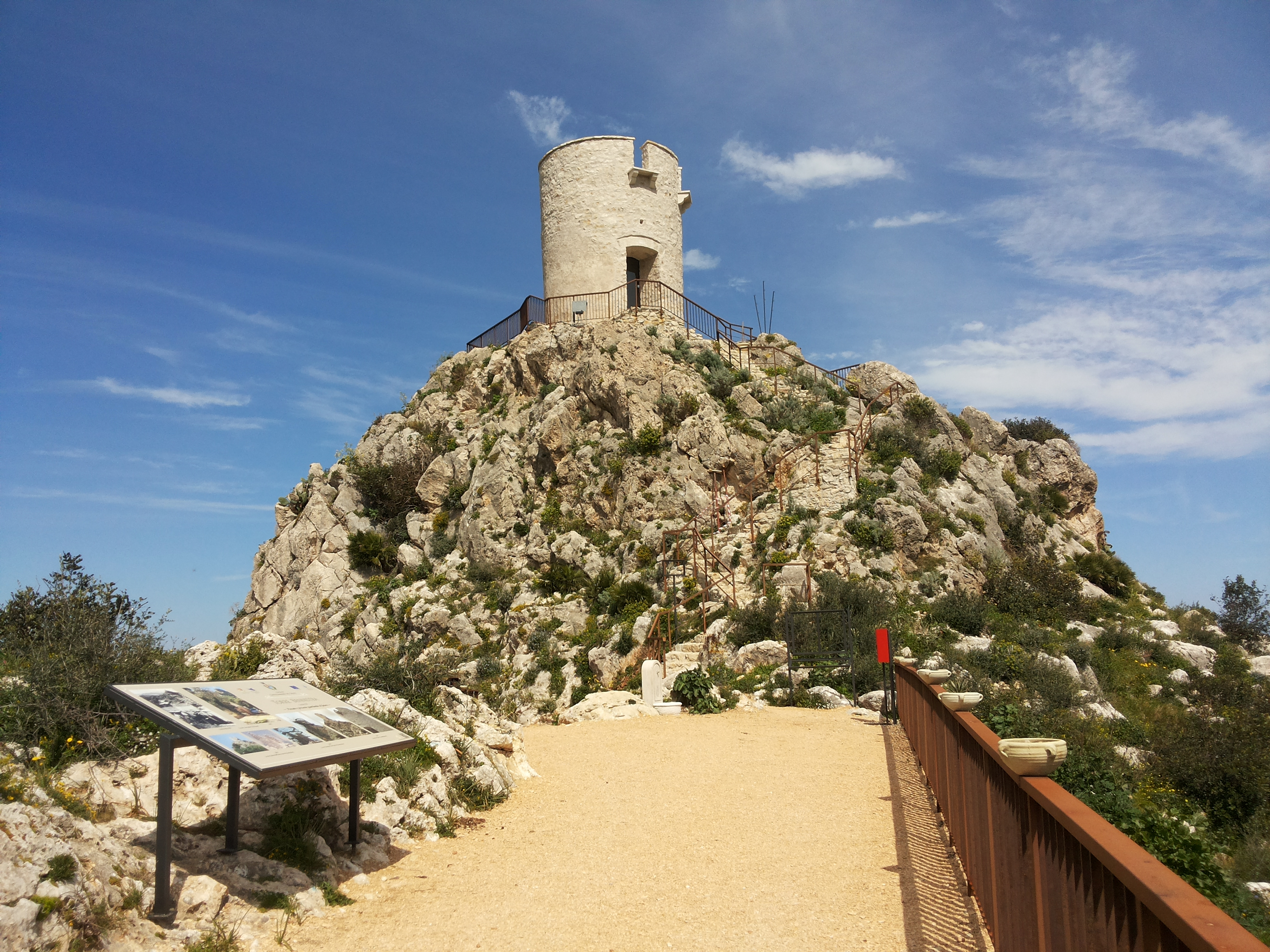
Torre Bennistra (the tower)

== See also ==
- Gulf of Castellammare
- Riserva naturale dello Zingaro

== Notes ==
1.^ Dati Istat 2001, dawinci.istat.it. URL consultato l'08-12-2011.

2.^ Fonte Istat 2001

3.^ Il baglio di Scopello

4.^ Chiesascopellobalatadibaida.it
