= San Vito Lo Capo Lighthouse =

San Vito Lo Capo
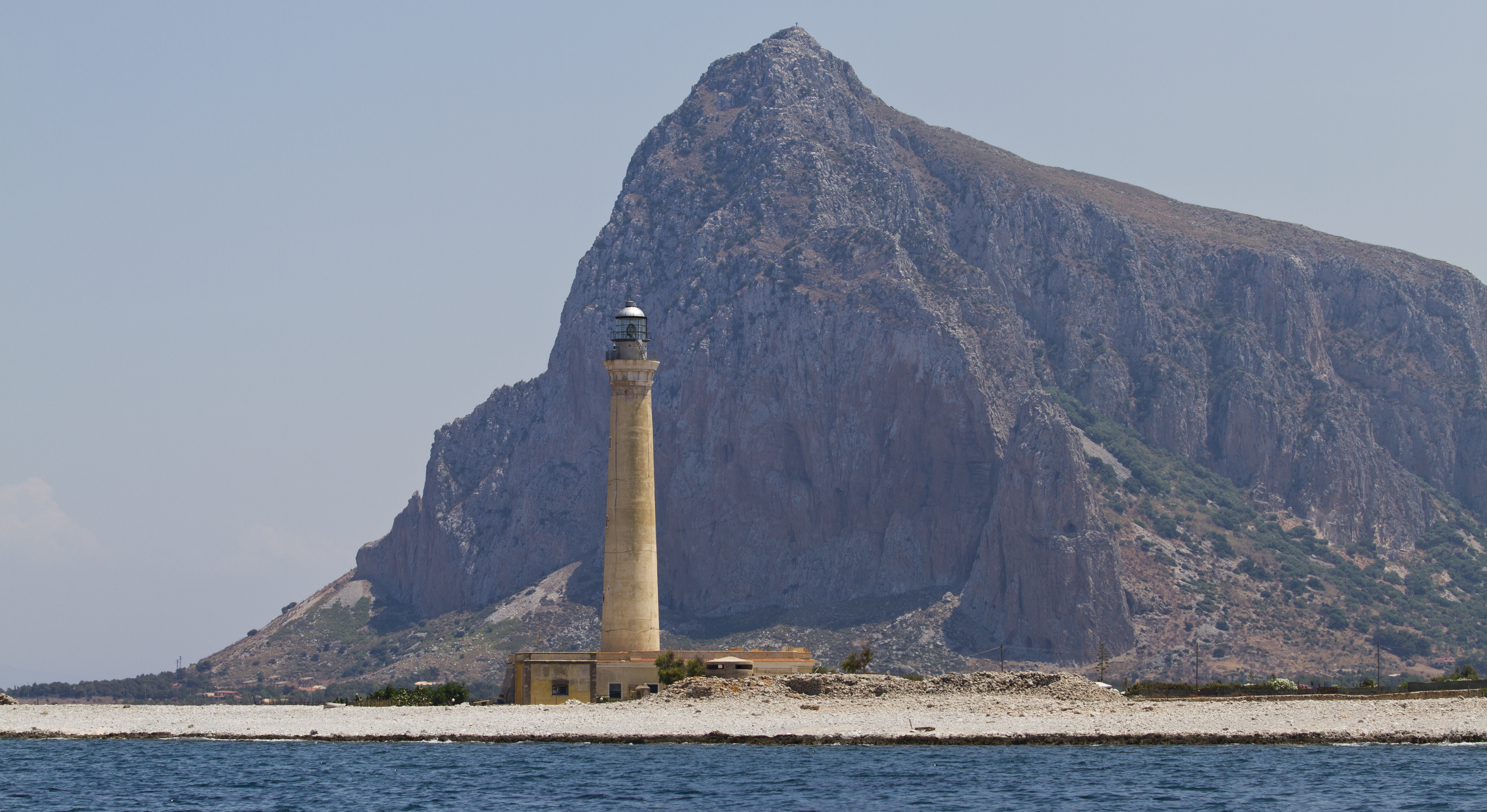
- San Vito Lo Capo Lighthouse
- Location: San Vito Lo Capo; Trapani; Sicily
- Coordinates: 38°11′18″N 12°44′00″E

Tower
- Constructed: 1859
- Foundation: concrete base
- Construction: concrete tower
- Height: 38 metres (125 ft)
- Shape: tapered cylindrical tower with balcony and lantern
- Markings: unpainted tower, white lantern, grey metallic lantern dome
- Power source: mains electricity
- Operator: Marina Militare

Light
- Focal height: 45 metres (148 ft); 12.5 metres (41 ft)
- Lens: Type OR 375; Focal length: 187.5 mm
- Intensity: main: AL 1000 W reserve: LED
- Range: main: 25 nautical miles (46 km; 29 mi) reserve: 11 nautical miles (20 km; 13 mi)
- Characteristic: Fl W 5s. Iso R 4s.
- Italy no.: 3170 E.F.

San Vito Lo Capo Lighthouse (Italian: Faro di San Vito Lo Capo) is an active lighthouse located in the municipality of San Vito Lo Capo on the western coast of Sicily at the end of the promontory, with the same name, between the Gulf of Macari and that of Castellammare.

== Description ==
The lighthouse was built in 1859 under the period of the House of Bourbon who ruled the Kingdom of the Two Sicilies. The lighthouse consists of a white cylindrical tower, 38 metres (125 ft) high, with balcony and lantern, attached to the front seaside 1-storey white masonry keeper's house. The lantern, painted in grey metallic, is positioned at 45 metres (148 ft) above sea level and emits one white flash in a 5 seconds period, visible up to a distance of 19 nautical miles (35 km; 22 mi). Another light positioned at 12.5 metres (41 ft) emits a red flash on and off in a 4 seconds period. The lighthouse is completely automated and is operated by the Marina Militare with the identification code number 2736 E.F.

== See also ==
- List of lighthouses in Italy
- San Vito Lo Capo
