= Castellammare del Golfo =

Castellammare del Golfo Casteḍḍammari (Sicilian)
- Comune
- Comune di Castellammare del Golfo
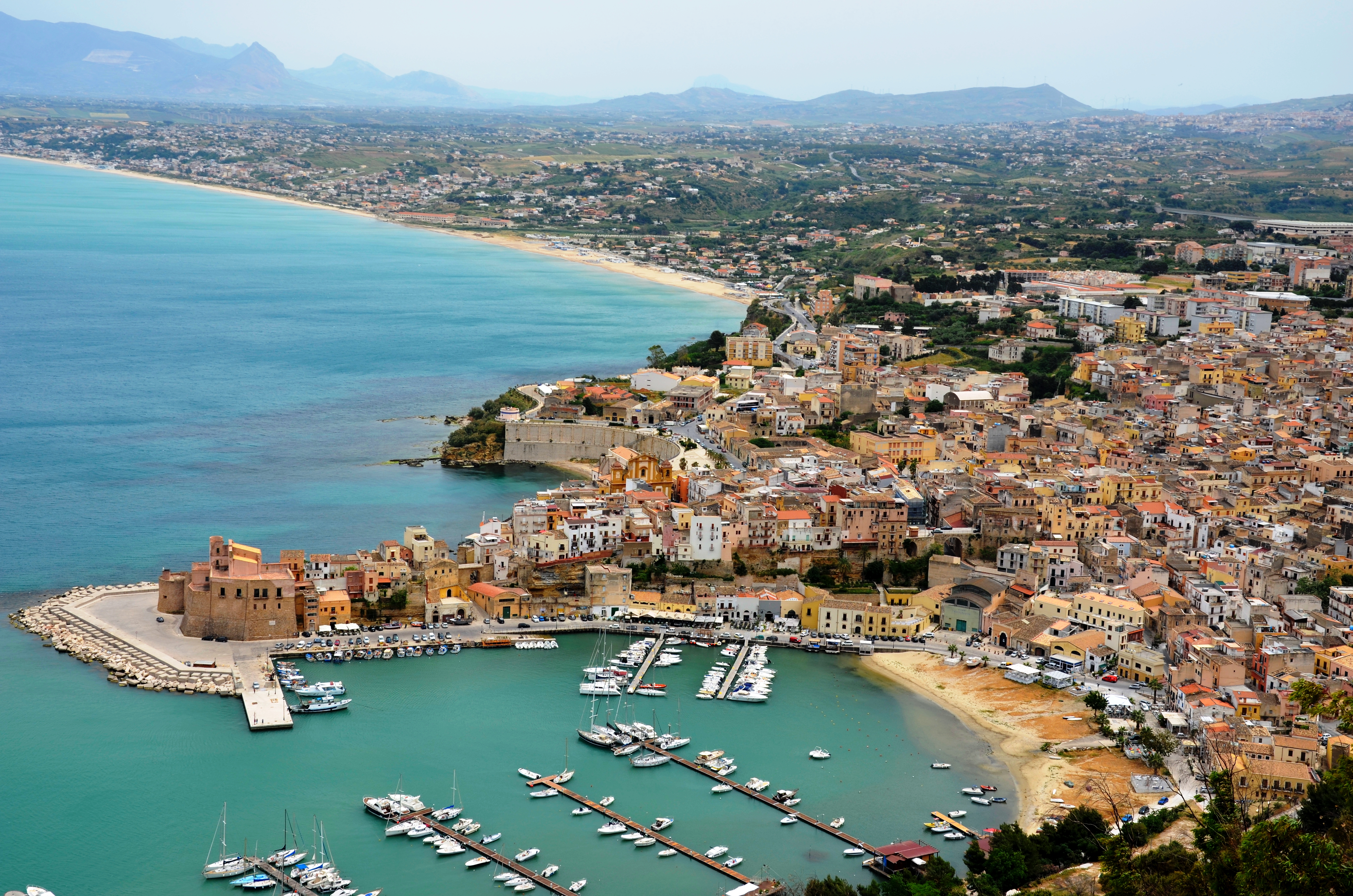

- Coat of arms

- Location within Italy Location within Sicily
- Coordinates: 38°01′35″N 12°52′50″E
- Country: Italy
- Region: Sicily
- Province: Trapani (TP)
- Frazioni: Balata di Baida, Scopello, Guidaloca, Fraginesi, Lu Baruni

Government
  - Mayor: Giuseppe Fausto

Area
  - Total: 127.32 km^{2} (49.16 sq mi)
- Elevation: 26 m (85 ft)

Population (28 February 2017)
  - Total: 15,293
  - Density: 120.11/km^{2} (311.10/sq mi)
- Demonym: Castellammarese
- Time zone: UTC+1 (CET)
  - Summer (DST): UTC+2 (CEST)
- Postal code: 91014; Balata di Baida: 91010
- Dialing code: 0924
- Patron saint: Maria SS. del Soccorso
- Saint day: August 21
- Website: Official website

Castellammare del Golfo (Italian: [kaˌstɛllamˈmaːre del ˈɡolfo]; Sicilian: Casteḍḍammari [kaˌstɛɖɖamˈmaːɾɪ]; Latin: Emporium Segestanorum or Emporium Aegestensium) is a town and municipality in the Trapani Province of Sicily. The name can be translated as "Sea Fortress on the Gulf", stemming from the medieval fortress in the harbor. The nearby body of water conversely takes its name from the town, and is known as Gulf of Castellammare.

Heading upwards from its marina/harbour called "Cala Marina", with many restaurants and bars, the urban plan is made of steps and winding streets that lead to Piazza Petrolo in one direction or towards the main central gardens, where the town center lies with many shops, cafes and restaurants. The main street is called Corso Garibaldi.

== History ==
According to historians and geographers such as Ptolemy, Diodorus Siculus and Strabo, Castellammare del Golfo was born as Emporium Segestanorum, port of Segesta, a nearby city which shared the same ordeals until its fall. The Arabs invaded Castellammare del Golfo from 827 AD and called it al-Madarij, meaning "The Steps", probably because of a steep street leading up from the harbour to the area of the fortified bastion. After the Arabs first built the castle fortress, it was later enlarged by the Normans. The building stood on a rocky outcrop near the sea, linked to the mainland by a wooden drawbridge.

Fishing has been important in Castellammare del Golfo since ancient times. The modern town's economy continues to be based on fishing with the addition of tourism.

The small town is noted for being the birthplace of many Sicilian-American Mafia figures, including Sebastiano DiGaetano, Salvatore Maranzano, Stefano Magaddino, Vito Bonventre, John Tartamella, and Joseph Bonanno. This is the origin of the Castellamarese war, fought by the Masseria clan against the Maranzano clan for control of the Underworld in New York City.

During the height of Italian immigration to the United States, many residents from Castellammare del Golfo immigrated to New York City and settled on Elizabeth Street in Little Italy, Italian Harlem, and the Bushwick, Carroll Gardens and East New York neighborhoods of Brooklyn. After World War II, many residents from Castellammare del Golfo continued to relocate to New York City, this time, settling in the Gravesend, Bensonhurst and Dyker Heights neighborhoods of Brooklyn, as well as the Ridgewood and Middle Village neighborhoods of Queens, the Morris Park section of the Bronx, and throughout the borough of Staten Island. New York City is home to the largest diaspora of people either born in or able to trace their lineage back to Castellammare del Golfo.

In the past decades, Castellammare del Golfo has become an important tourist location as it is conveniently situated between Palermo and Trapani.

== Nearby places ==
Nearby places include Segesta, with its Doric temple and an amphitheater where performances are still held.

- Trapani about 35 km to the west;
- Palermo about 30 km to the east;
- Scopello with its tonnara (traditional tuna fishing ground) to the west;
- San Vito Lo Capo to the west;
- Riserva naturale dello Zingaro also to the west, with its bay beaches only accessible on foot or boat;
- Erice, a historic village, located 750 metres (2,460 ft) above sea level.

From Castellammare del Golfo you can take a boat trip departing from Cala Marina to the Egadi Islands situated in front of Trapani.

To the east, the gulf of Castellammare has a stretch of 30 kilometres (19 mi) of white sandy beaches.

== Films ==
Castellammare del Golfo has also been a location for various films, including:

- For the Love of Mariastella (1946)
- Avenging Angelo (2002)
- My Name Is Tanino (2002)
- Ocean's Twelve (2004)
- Cefalonia (2005 TV series)
- Largo Winch (2008)
- Inspector Montalbano, episode "The Sense of Touch" (2012)
- Leaves of the Tree (2015)

== People ==
- Joseph Bonanno, crime boss, historical leader of the Bonanno crime family
- Giovanni Bonventre, underboss of the Bonanno crime family
- Vito Bonventre, mobster who was a leading member of the Brooklyn gang that would later become the Bonanno crime family
- Stefano Magaddino, crime boss of the Buffalo crime family
- Salvatore Maranzano, mobster, founder of the Bonanno crime family
- Sergio Mattarella, politician, 12th and current president of the Italian republic
- Piersanti Mattarella, politician and the 12th president of Sicily (1978–1980)
- Bernardo Mattarella, politician and a founder of the Christian Democracy
- Joseph Barbara, Italian-American mobster, caporegime of the Buffalo crime family
- Sebastiano DiGaetano, mafia boss of what would later become known as the Bonanno crime family
- Salvatore Sabella, crime boss and founder of Philadelphia crime family
- Joey Gallo, American baseball player whose mother was born in Castellammare del Golfo
- John Ventimiglia, American actor whose parents were born in Castellammare del Golfo

== See also ==
- Castello Normanno Lighthouse
