= Balestrate =

Balestrate Sicciara (Sicilian)
- Comune
- Comune di Balestrate
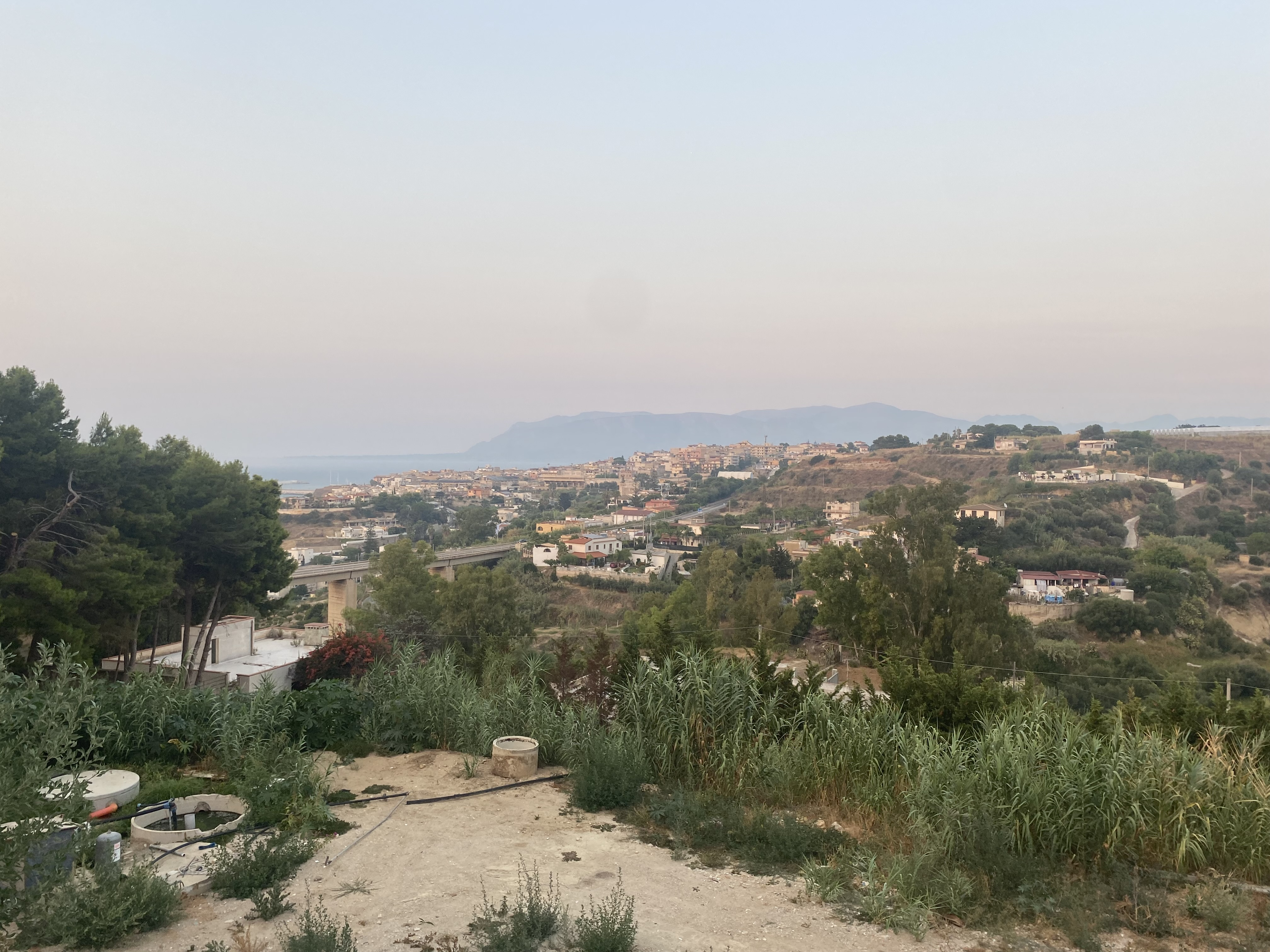
- View of Balestrate from the Residence Villaggio Petruso

- Location within Italy Location within Sicily
- Coordinates: 38°3′N 13°7′E
- Country: Italy
- Region: Sicily
- Metropolitan city: Palermo (PA)

Government
  - Mayor: Vito Rizzo

Area
  - Total: 3.9 km^{2} (1.5 sq mi)

Population (2015)
  - Total: 6,505
  - Density: 1,700/km^{2} (4,300/sq mi)
- Demonym: Sicciaroti
- Time zone: UTC+1 (CET)
  - Summer (DST): UTC+2 (CEST)
- Postal code: 90041
- Dialing code: 091

Balestrate (Sicilian: Sicciara) is a comune (municipality) in the Metropolitan City of Palermo in the Italian region Sicily, located about 25 kilometres (16 mi) southwest of Palermo. As of 31 July 2015, it had a population of 6,505 and an area of 3.9 square kilometres (1.5 mi^{2}).

== Territory ==
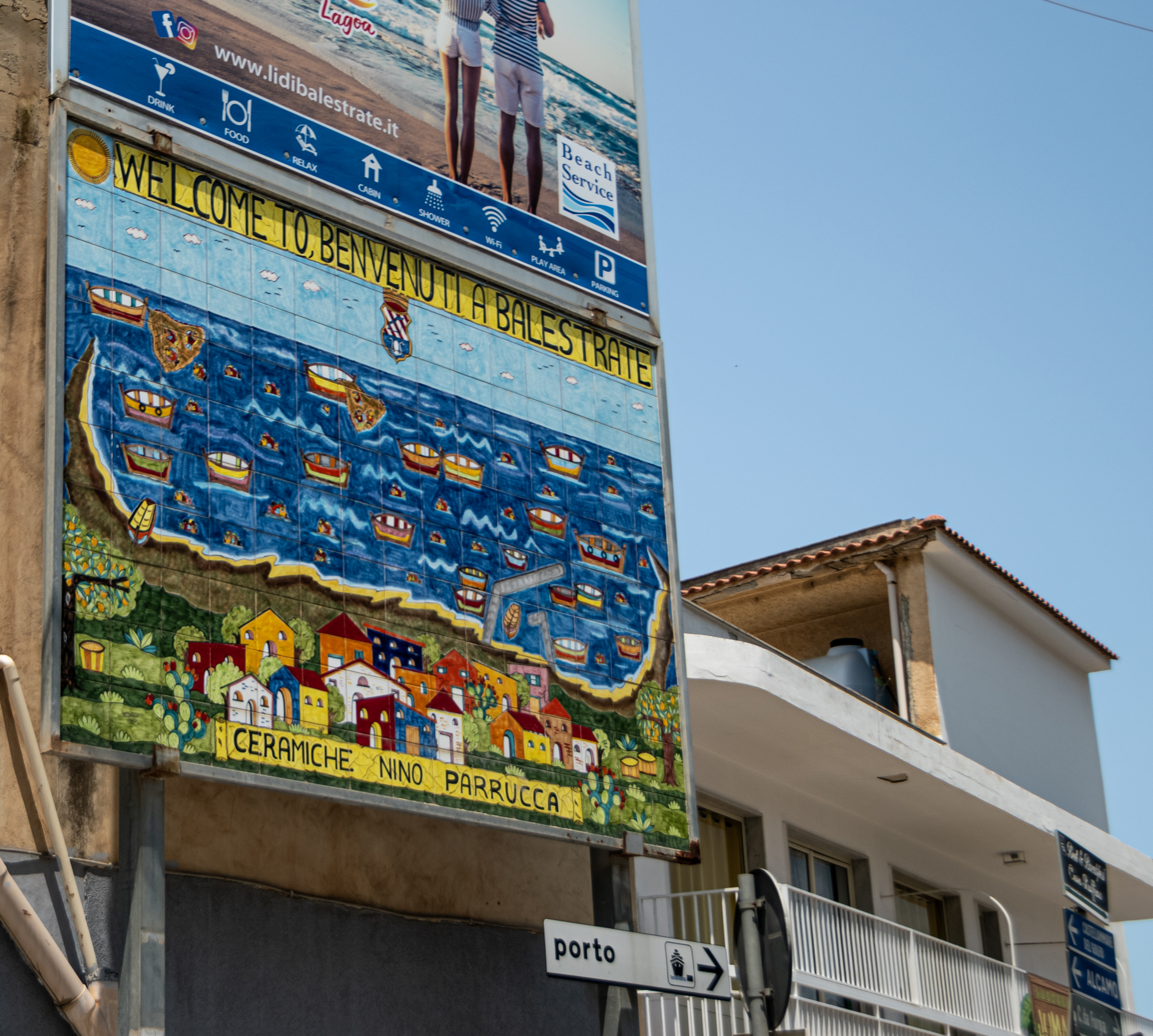
Benvenuti a Balestrate sign on Via Mattarella

Located in Western Sicily, on the rail line between Palermo and Trapani, Balestrate is exactly in the center of the Gulf of Castellamare. Balestrate borders the following municipalities: Alcamo, Partinico, Trappeto.

== Coat of arms ==
Coat of arms of Balestrate

The Coat of Arms of Balestrate with its Norman crown, honors "Sicciara," the town's original name, with the symbol of the cuttlefish (“sicci”) so abundant in its waters. The residents of Balestrate still call themselves "sicciaroti" - the "cuttlefish people" - in honour of the old name.

== History ==
The Spanish King Federico III of Aragon gave the territory of Balestrate to the town of Partinico in 1307. According to a local legend, a crossbow (“balestra”) was used to shoot an arrow from the water's edge, its landing point determining the border of the town's environs and giving its eventual name: Balestrate.

In 1672, a landowner named Rosalia Leto bequeathed uncultivated lands to the local people on condition that they cultivated them. The small town began to take shape, becoming self-governing in 1829. Its development continued to flourish in large part due to the investments of the English winemaking companies of Ingham, Woodhouse, Whittaker and the Palermitan Florio family. In many ways the early fortune of Balestrate was tied in with the rising popularity of sweet Marsala wine. In previous times it was the place where much of the grape crop was grown for the island's famous Marsala wine.

== Economy ==
Today Balestrate's main industry is fishing and tourism. A small town of nearly 6000 most of the year, Balestrate's population swells up to almost 30,000 during the Summer season with vacationing Europeans and Italians from the colder climates seeking the warm water and sun.

== Famous people from Balestrate ==
- Filippo Evola (1812-1897) doctor, rector of Casa Professa.
- Giuseppe Bommarito (1944-1983) carabiniere, gold medal for the civil value, in memory.

== Demographic evolution ==
Historical population

Year	Pop.	±%
1861	1,623	—
1871	1,851	+14.0%
1881	2,606	+40.8%
1901	3,931	+50.8%
1911	4,237	+7.8%

Year	Pop.	±%
1921	4,075	−3.8%
1931	4,693	+15.2%
1936	4,707	+0.3%
1951	5,686	+20.8%
1961	5,546	−2.5%

Year	Pop.	±%
1971	4,753	−14.3%
1981	5,162	+8.6%
1991	5,651	+9.5%
2001	5,693	+0.7%

Source: Data from ISTAT
