= Gulf of Castellammare =

- Golfo di Castellammare (Italian)
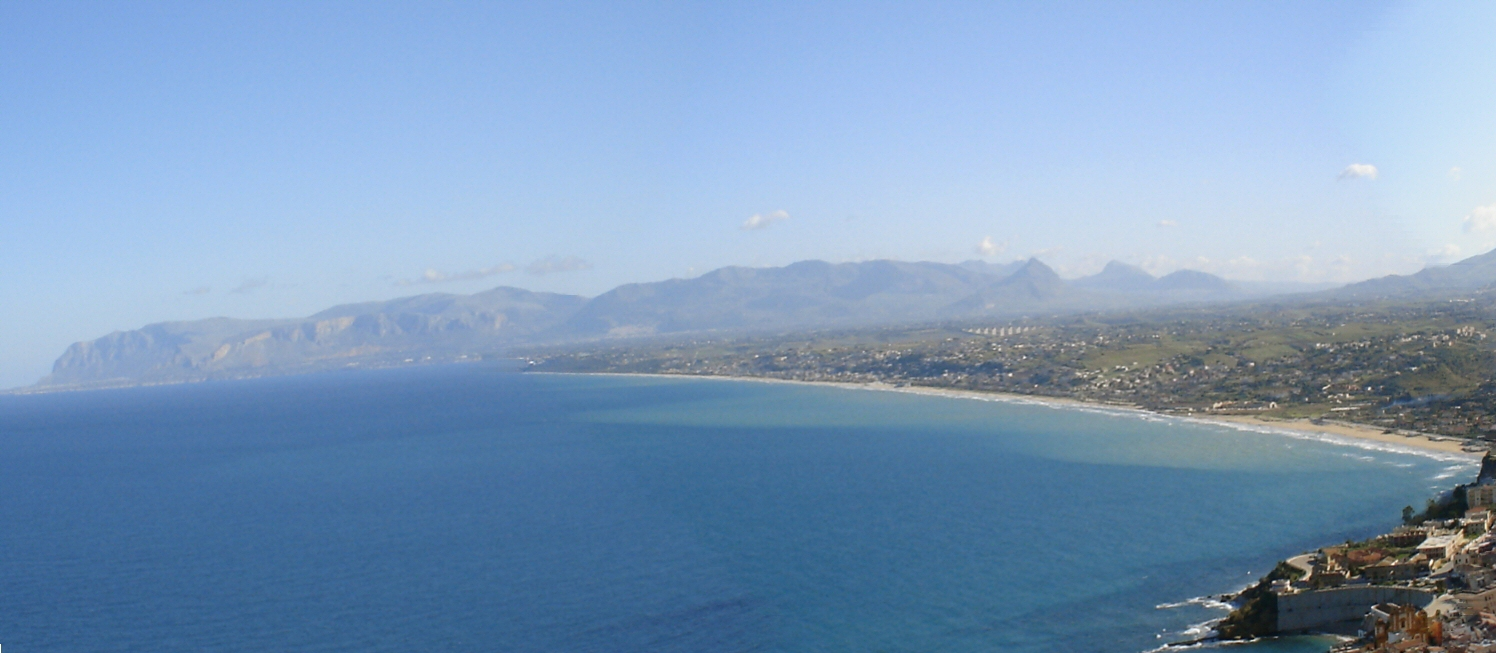
- Overview of gulf of Castellammare

- Location within Sicily Location within Italy
- Location: Sicily
- Coordinates: 38°2′26.88″N 12°55′18.48″E
- Etymology: Castellammare del Golfo
- Part of: Mediterranean Sea
- Settlements: Terrasini, Trappeto, Balestrate, Alcamo, Castellammare del Golfo, San Vito Lo Capo

The gulf of Castellammare is a large and deep natural inlet going from Capo Rama (near Terrasini, in the province of Palermo) and Capo San Vito near San Vito Lo Capo, in the province of Trapani. It is located on the western coast of Sicily and it faces the Tyrrhenian Sea.

== History ==
In the Roman period the gulf of Castellammare was called "Sinus Aegestanus", referring to the ancient town of Segesta, which still has some ruins (the temple and the theatre).

In 1714 it was called "golfo di Longuro or Longarico" by Guglielmo del'Isle in his geographical map, referring to the old town centre existing near the present Alcamo.

== Municipalities ==
Along the gulf from east to west are, in sequence, the communes of Terrasini, Trappeto, Balestrate, Alcamo, Castellammare del Golfo and San Vito Lo Capo. The small town of Castellammare del Golfo, which gives its name to the gulf itself, is in its centre.

In 2001 local governments constituted the association "Sviluppo del Golfo" (Gulf Development), and in its ambit they founded the "Patto Territoriale Golfo di Castellammare", an initiative by different local authorities and representatives of social and economic parties having as a scope the local development of the Gulf of Castellammare. In this agreement the participants are the municipalities of this gulf and those near it, various associations and the Banca Don Rizzo. In 2010 they also formed the "Local Action Group Gulf of Castellammare", involving different communes, economic subjects, associations and professional organizations, to form a joint plan of local development for the territory of the Gulf of Castellammare.

== Tourist attractions ==
On the eastern end of the gulf is the Riserva naturale orientata Capo Rama, while west of Castellammare towards San Vito Lo Capo is the Zingaro nature reserve (Riserva naturale dello Zingaro), and Scopello with its stacks and almadraba (tonnara).

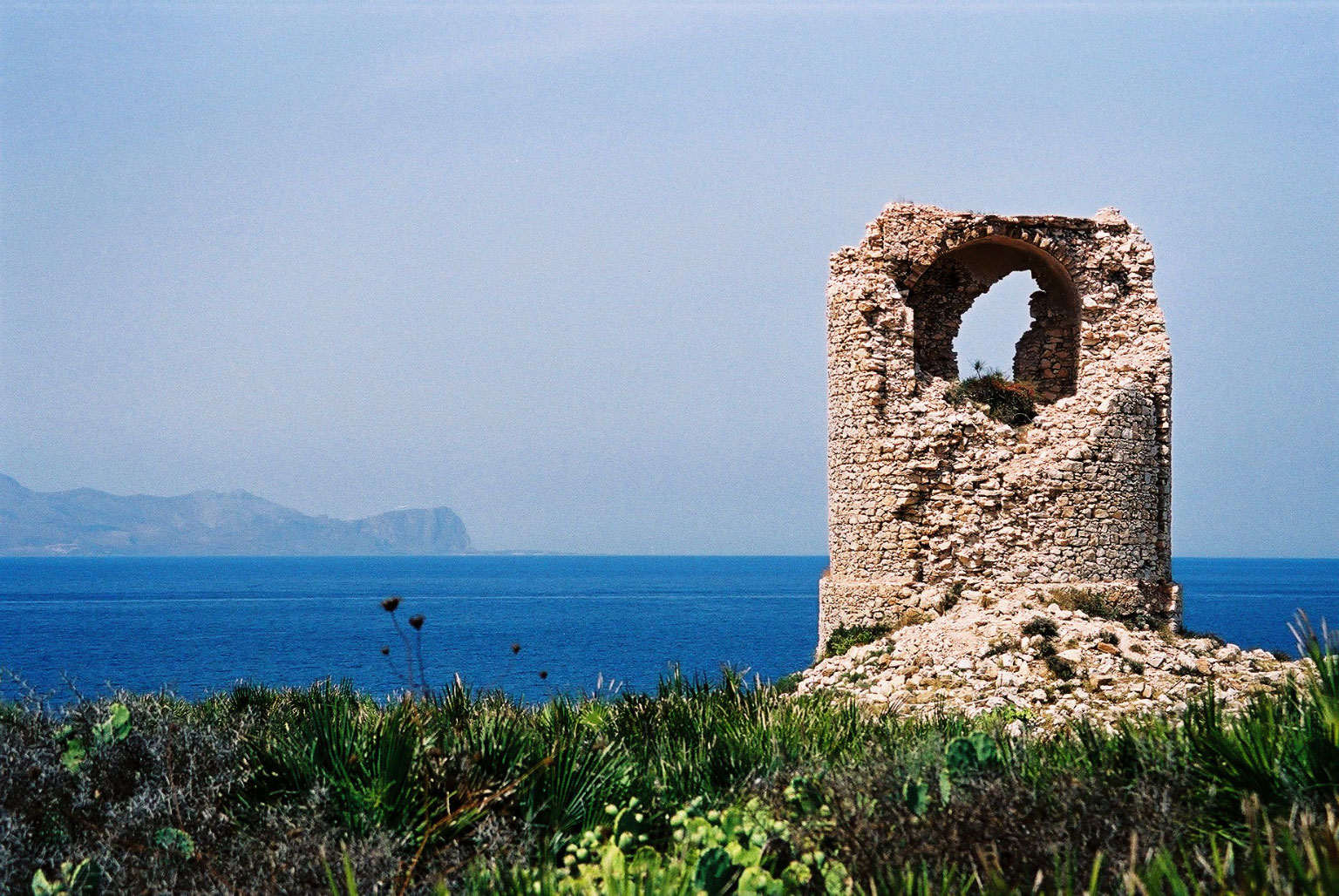
Tower on the coast in Capo Rama nature reserve

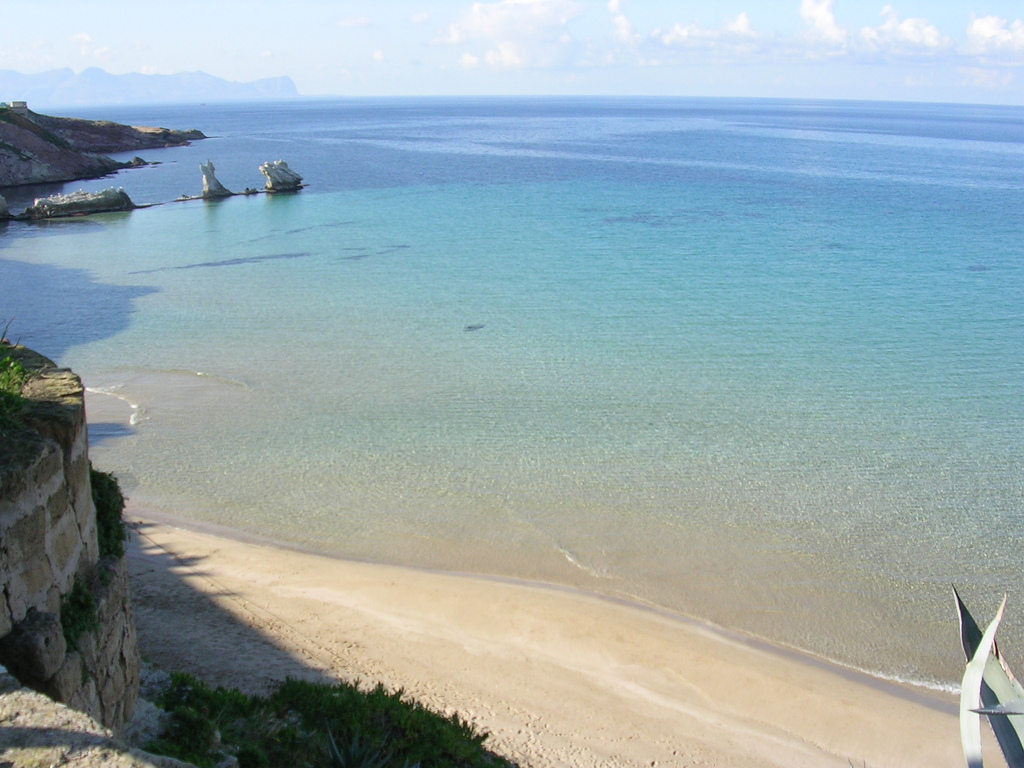
Beach at Terrasini

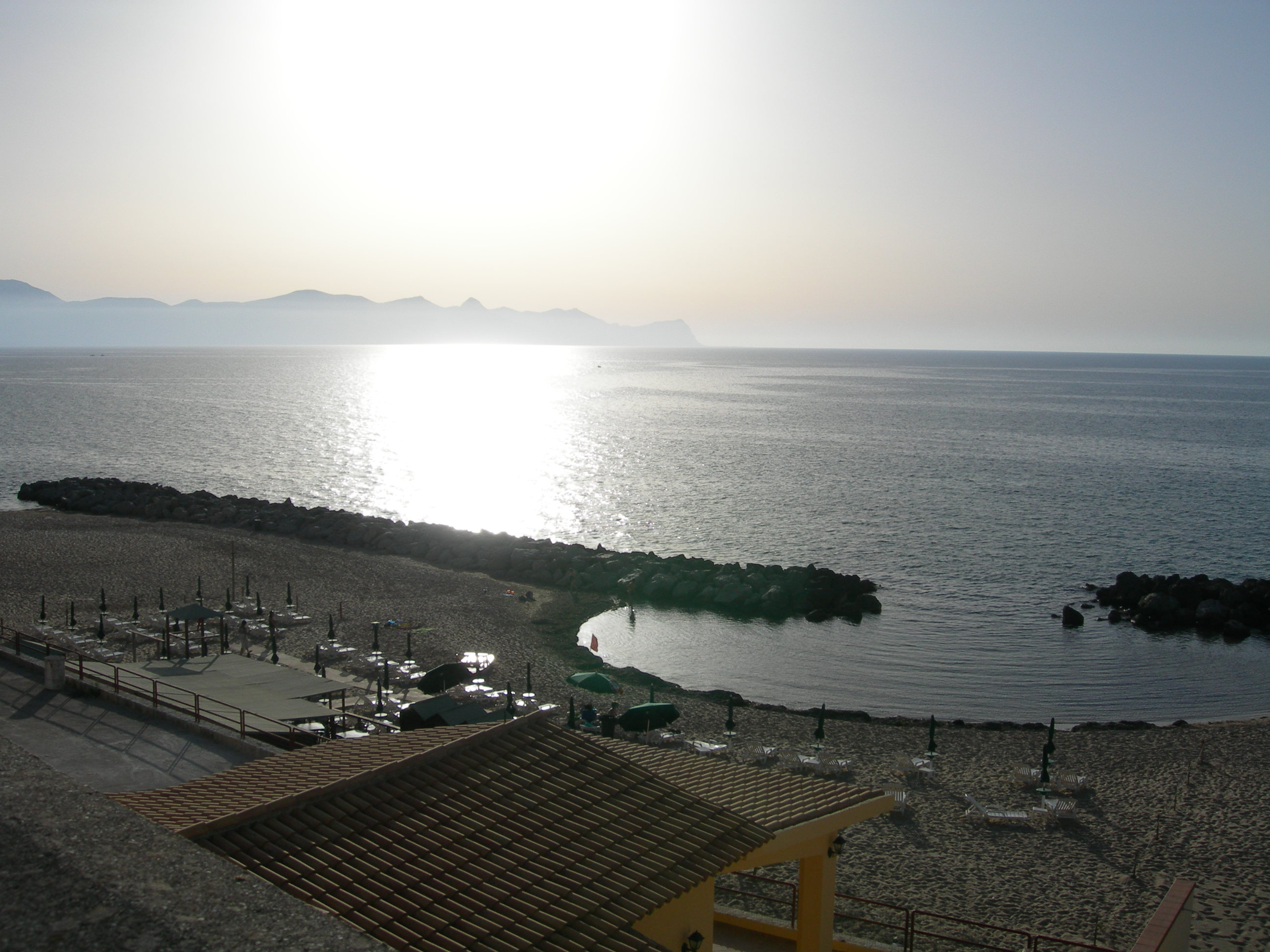
Trappeto Beach

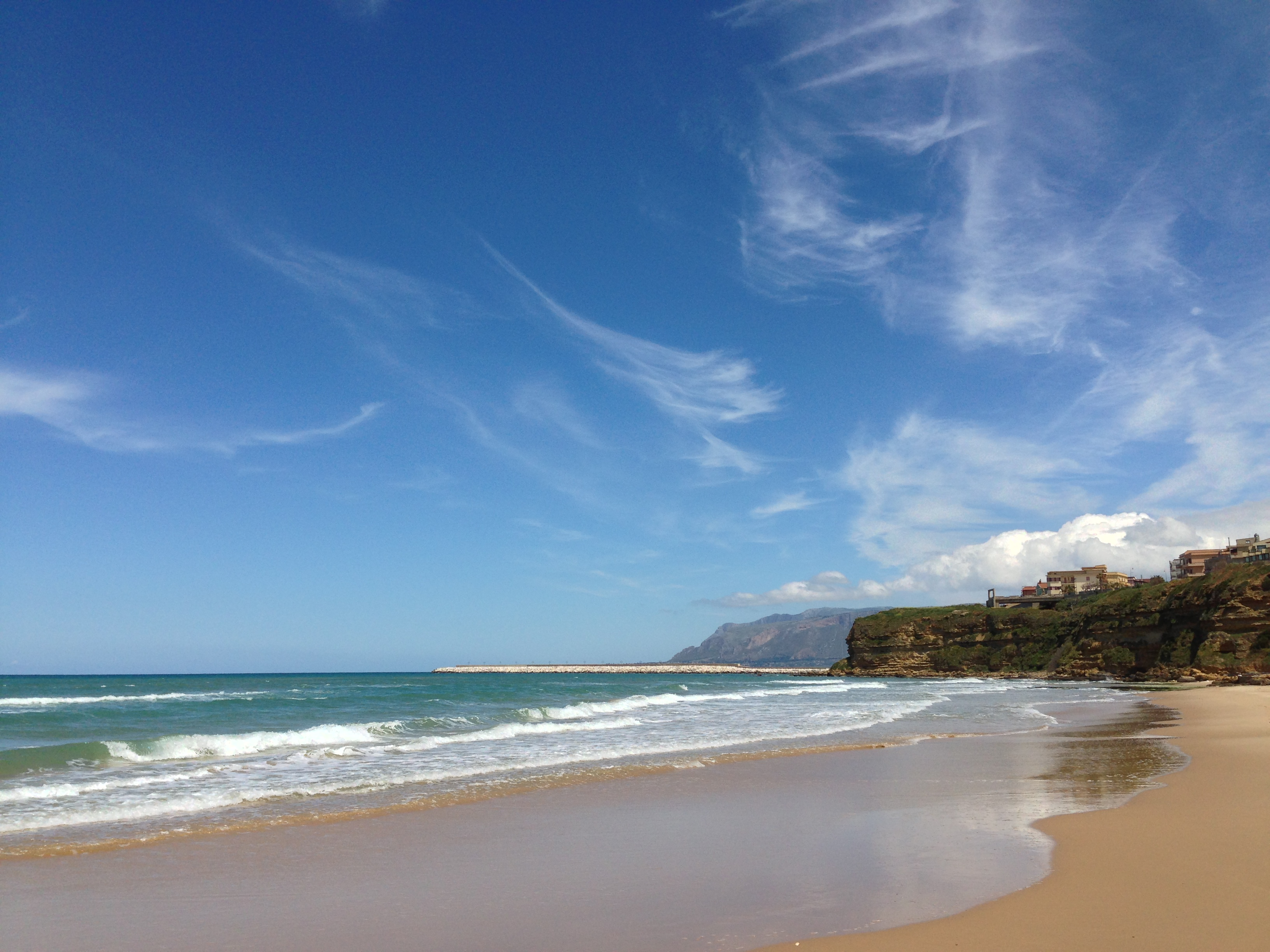
Beach in Balestrate

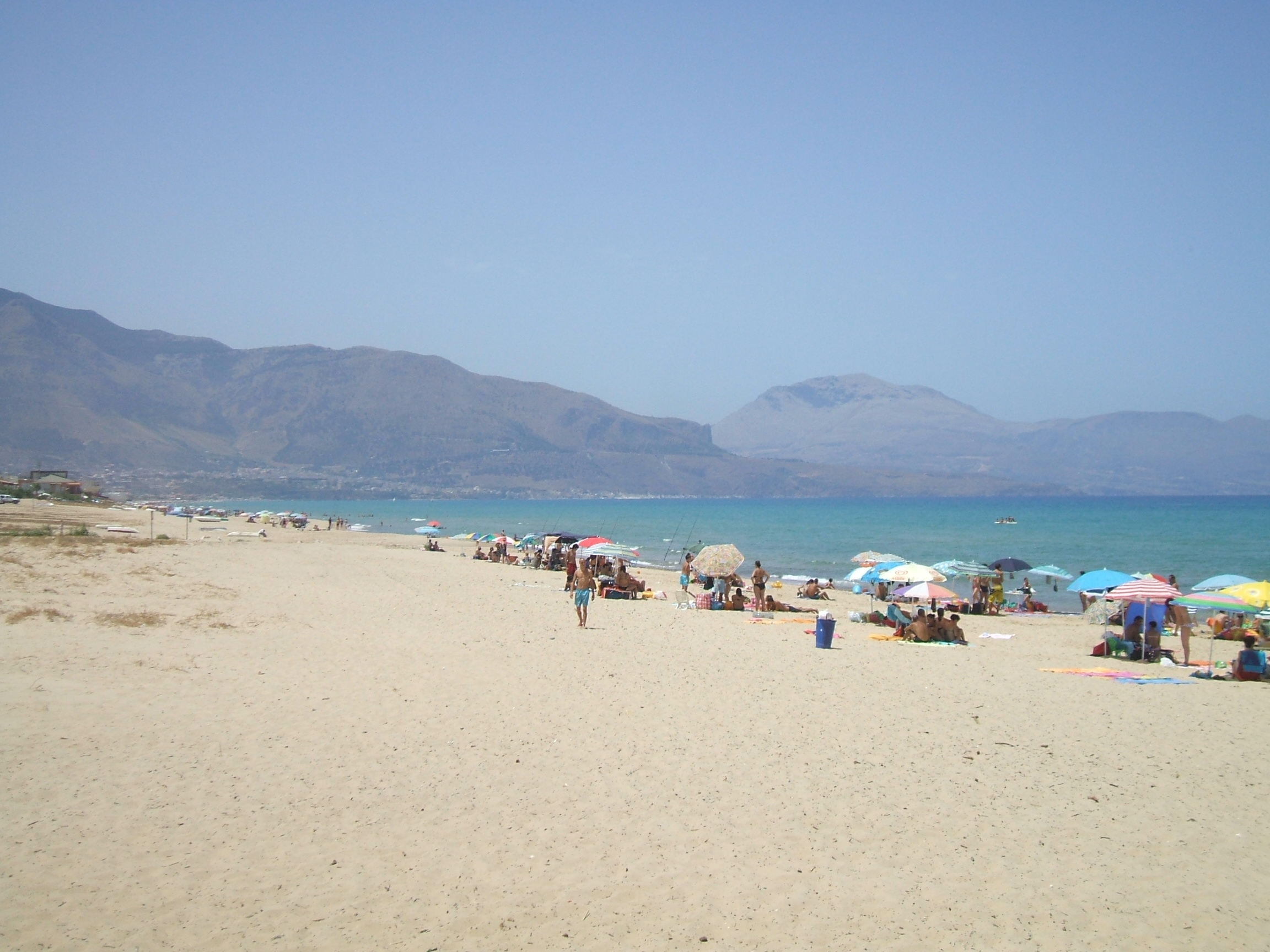
Alcamo Marina

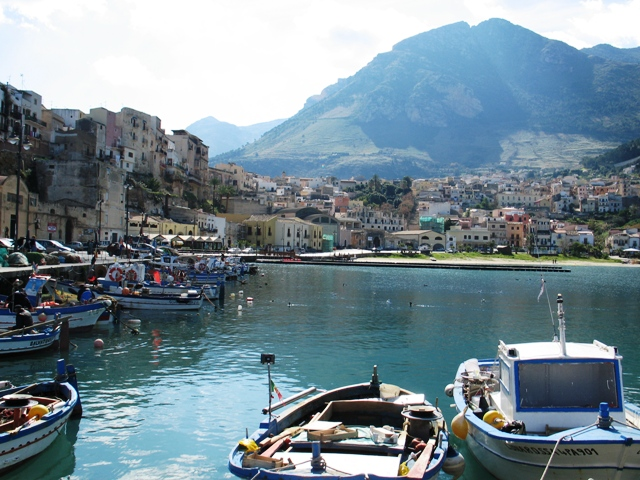
Castellammare del Golfo harbour

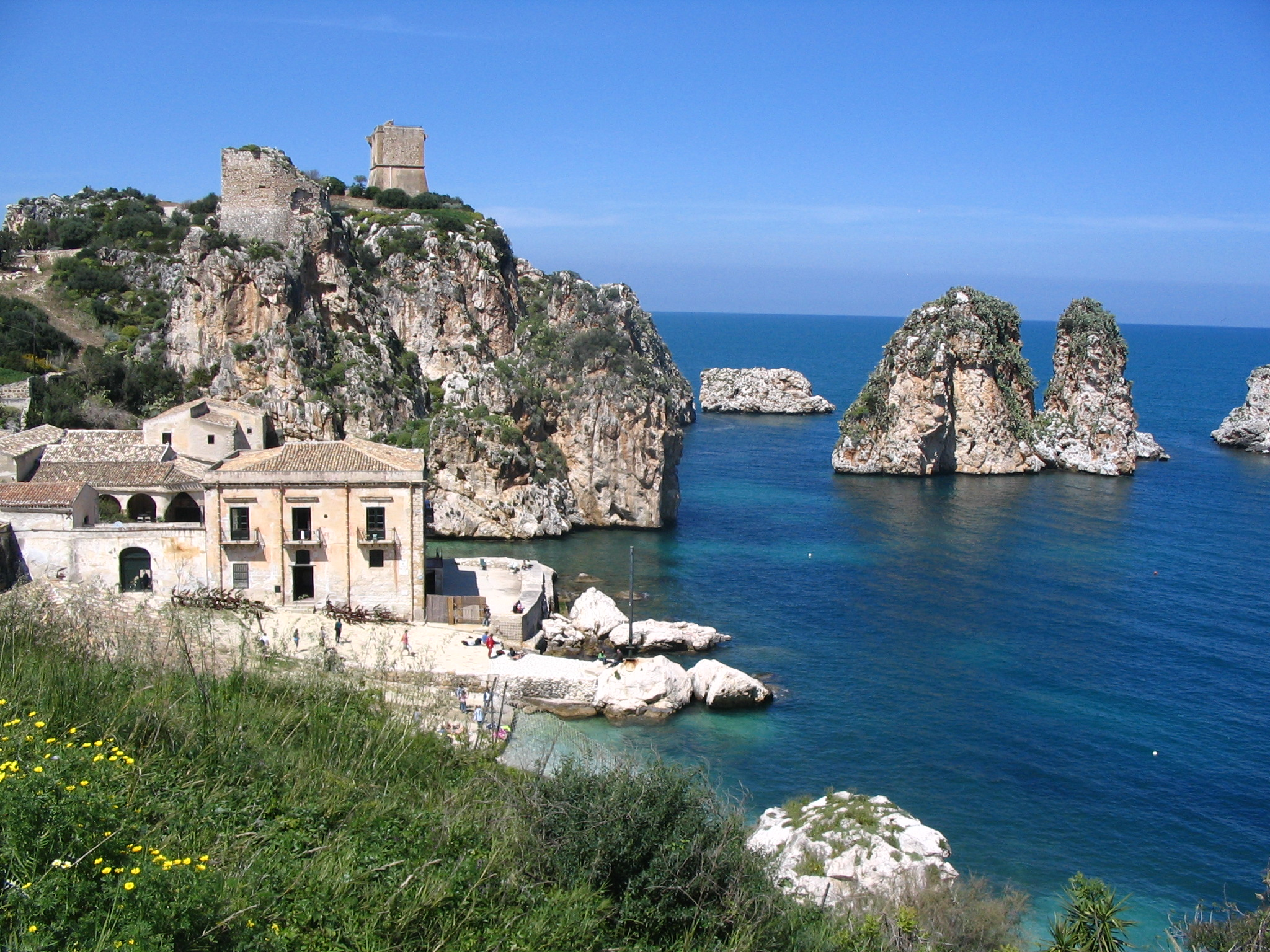
Faraglioni and tonnara of Scopello, Trapani

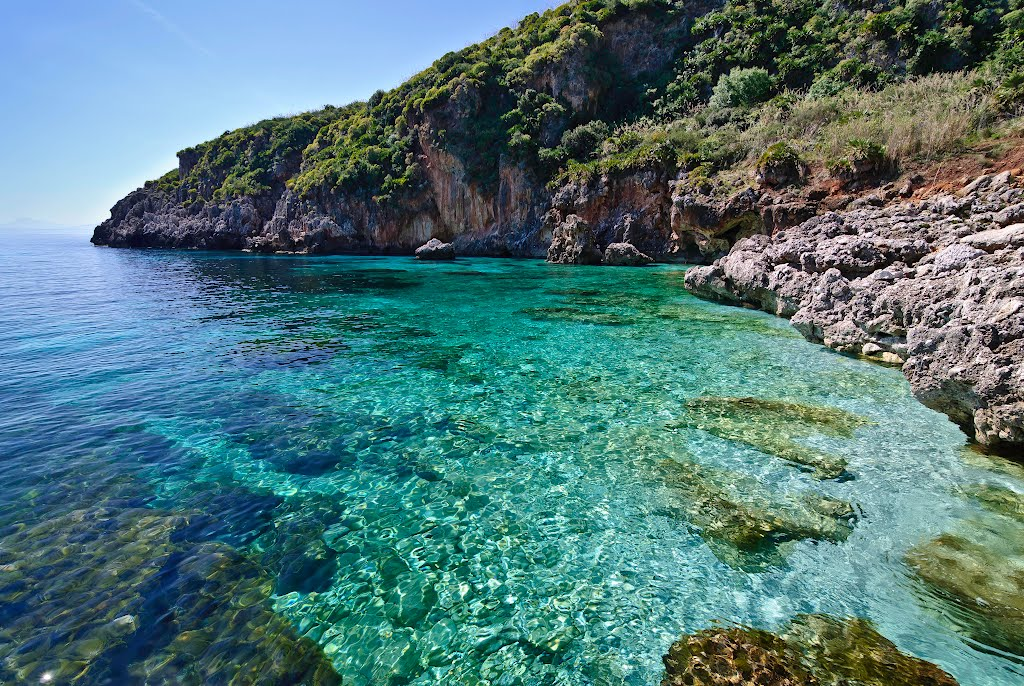
Riserva naturale dello Zingaro

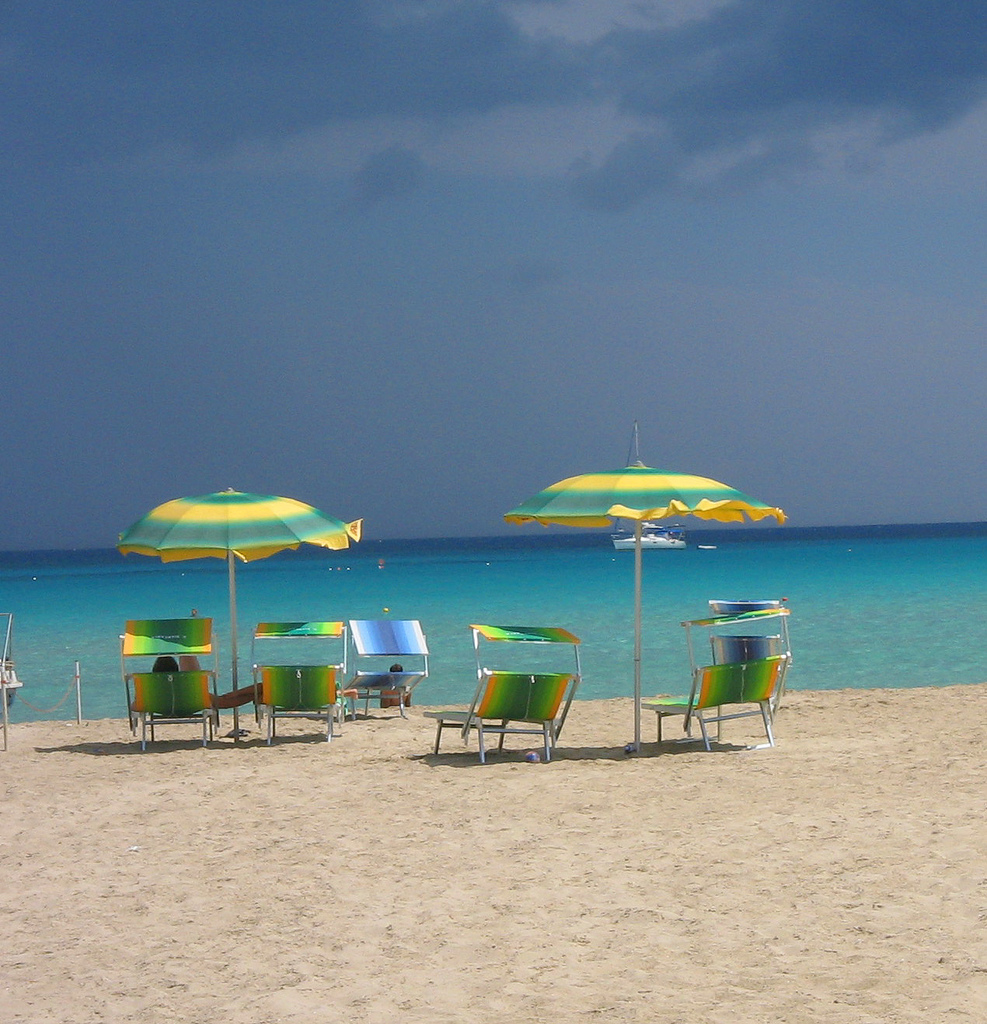
Beach at San Vito Lo Capo

== See also ==
- Castellammare del Golfo
- Gulf of Macari
