= Castello Normanno Lighthouse =

Castello Normanno
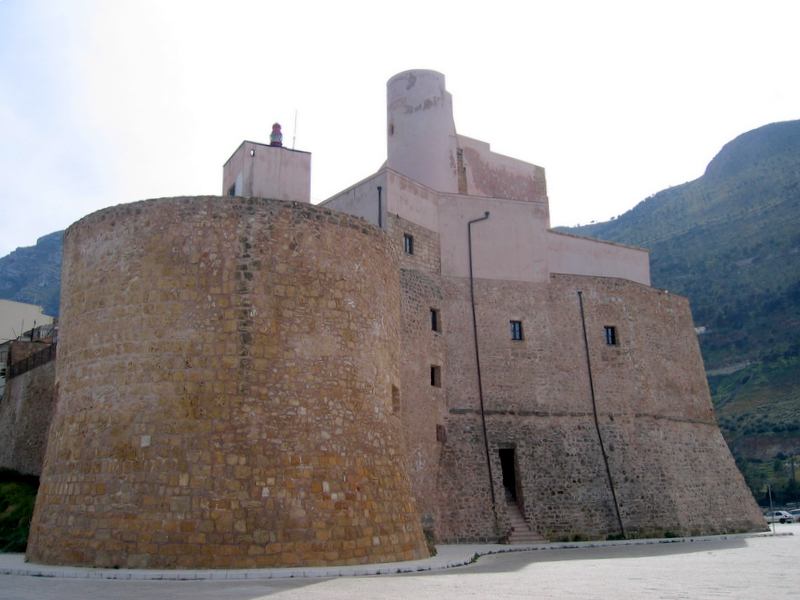
- Castello Normanno Lighthouse
- Location: Castellammare del Golfo; Sicily; Italy
- Coordinates: 38°01′51″N 12°52′55″E

Tower
- Constructed: 1901
- Construction: concrete equipment building
- Height: 4 metres (13 ft)
- Shape: quadrangular building with lantern atop a mediaeval fortification
- Markings: white lantern
- Power source: mains electricity
- Operator: Marina Militare

Light
- First lit: 1901
- Focal height: 19 metres (62 ft)
- Lens: type TD
- Intensity: LABI 100 W
- Range: 10 nautical miles (19 km; 12 mi)
- Characteristic: Fl (2) W 10s.
- Italy no.: 3182 E.F.

Castello Normanno Lighthouse (Italian: Faro delCastello Normanno) is an active lighthouse located in Castellammare del Golfo at the northern extremity of the tip of the harbour.

== Description ==
The lighthouse was activated in 1901 and consists of a concrete equipment construction, 4 metres (13 ft) high, atop a mediaeval fortification. The white lantern is positioned on the flat roof of the building at 19 metres (62 ft) above sea level and emits two white flashes in a 10-second period, visible up to a distance of 10 nautical miles (19 km; 12 mi). The lighthouse is completely automated, powered by a solar unit and is operated by the Marina Militare with the identification code number 2922 E.F.

== See also ==
- List of lighthouses in Italy
- Castellammare del Golfo
