= Trappeto =

- Comune
- Comune di Trappeto
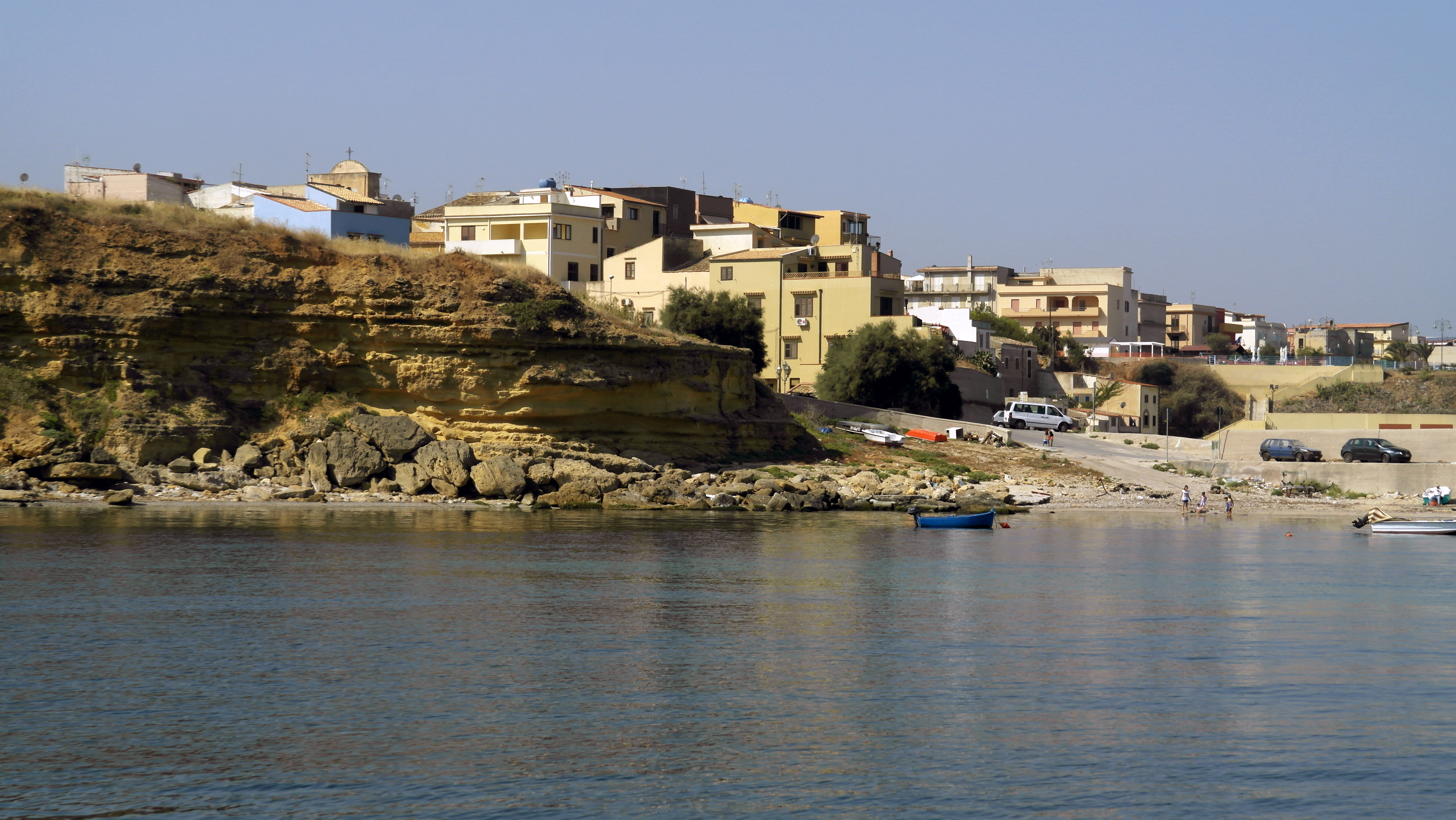

- Location within Italy Location within Sicily
- Coordinates: 38°4′N 13°2′E
- Country: Italy
- Region: Sicily
- Metropolitan city: Palermo (PA)

Area
  - Total: 4.1 km^{2} (1.6 sq mi)
- Elevation: 8 m (26 ft)

Population (January 2007)
  - Total: 3,103
  - Density: 760/km^{2} (2,000/sq mi)
- Time zone: UTC+1 (CET)
  - Summer (DST): UTC+2 (CEST)
- Postal code: 90040
- Dialing code: 091

Trappeto (Trappitu in Sicilian) is an Italian municipality of 3,123 inhabitants in the Metropolitan City of Palermo. It is located in the north-west part of Sicily, and is part of the metropolitan area of Palermo. Trappeto is 45 kilometres (28 mi) from Palermo and about 60 kilometres (37 mi) from Trapani.

It is a seaside resort on the coast in the Gulf of Castellammare, founded in the 15th century. Frederick II of Aragon used it as part of his hunting grounds. From this, Trappeto evolved as a fertile agricultural centre, and main sources of income for the town included fishing and tourism. Known as "Trappetum cannamelarum", for the mill of the Sugar cane which was planted here in 1480 by the rich landowner Francis Bologna, who subsequently made a fortune during the 16th century.

In early 1600 it was abandoned by its inhabitants, but was later returned to and repopulated at the end of 1700 for cultivating grapes for wine. Stable population took hold in the early 19th century, thanks to houses built around the old Church of the Annunciation. The city is famous for the work of activist, Danilo Dolci, a social and cultural writer who helped bring Trappeto back from depths of poverty and ruin. He established an orphanage in Trappeto. Trappeto is also famous for its beaches, with the most popular being Ciammarita

The beach Ciammarita is a spit of sand a few hundred metres long, overlooking the Mediterranean Sea. It is known to be capricious, and among the windiest places in Italy. It is reachable from Trapani taking exit "Partinico-Trappeto" from State Highway 113. Ciammarita is not far from the town of Trappeto, making walking to the beach a very popular choice for both tourists and residents.

== Demographic evolution ==
Historical population

Year	Pop.	±%
1861	487	—
1871	556	+14.2%
1881	782	+40.6%
1901	1,222	+56.3%
1911	1,396	+14.2%

Year	Pop.	±%
1921	1,430	+2.4%
1931	1,769	+23.7%
1936	1,882	+6.4%
1951	2,402	+27.6%
1961	2,469	+2.8%

Year	Pop.	±%
1971	2,328	−5.7%
1981	3,126	+34.3%
1991	3,059	−2.1%
2001	2,770	−9.4%

Source: Data from ISTAT
