= Riserva naturale dello Zingaro =

Natural Reserve in Sicily, Italy

Coordinates: 38.1042°N 12.7908°E

Zingaro Nature Reserve
- Riserva naturale orientata Zingaro
- IUCN category IV (habitat/species management area)
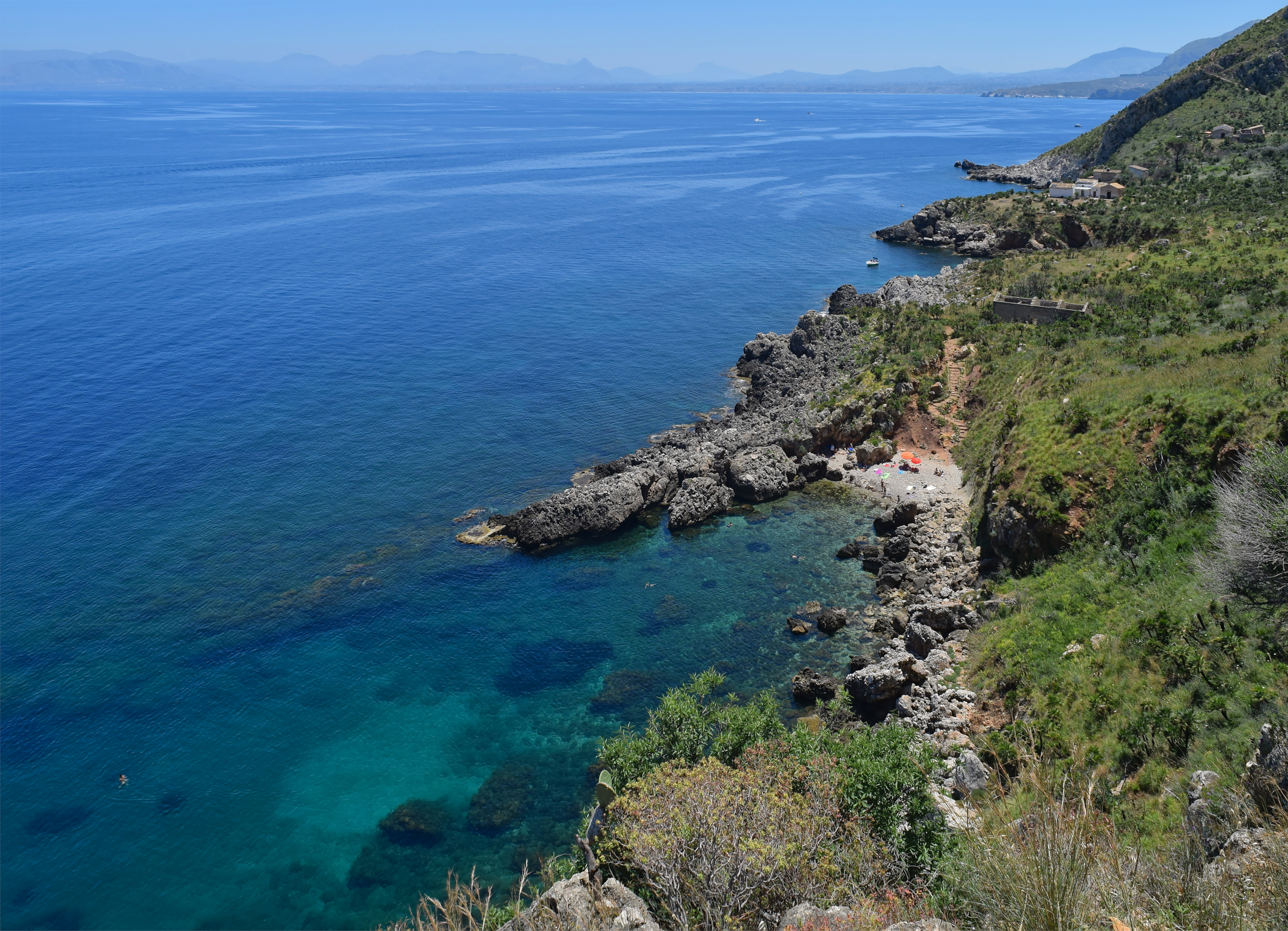
- Cala Berretta.
- Location: San Vito Lo Capo
- Area: 1,600 ha (4,000 acres)
- Established: May 6, 1981.
- Governing body: Azienda Foreste Demaniali della Regione Siciliana

The Riserva Naturale Orientata dello Zingaro was the first natural reserve set up in Sicily in May 1981, located almost completely in the municipal territory of San Vito Lo Capo. It stretches along some seven kilometers of unspoilt coastline of the Gulf of Castellammare and its mountain chain, the setting of steep cliffs and little bays.

The Zingaro Reserve has a large variety and abundance of rare and endemic plants, as well as a rich fauna. The highly varied ecological niches give a great diversity which is not easily found in others parts of the island. In the Zingaro Reserve at least 39 species of birds nest and mate, mainly birds of prey, including the peregrine falcon, the common kestrel and the common buzzard. The area has also a rich archaeological past; for example the spectacular Grotta dell'Uzzo was one of the first prehistoric settlements in Sicily. The reserve has a complex network of paths, shelters, water taps, picnic areas, museums, carpark, and other amenities; there are no roads and it can only be visited on foot.

The Zingaro Reserve incorporates not only the land and beaches, but also the adjacent sea. The beautiful beaches, pebbled and lapped by the clear blue sea, can be reached along various rather steep paths.

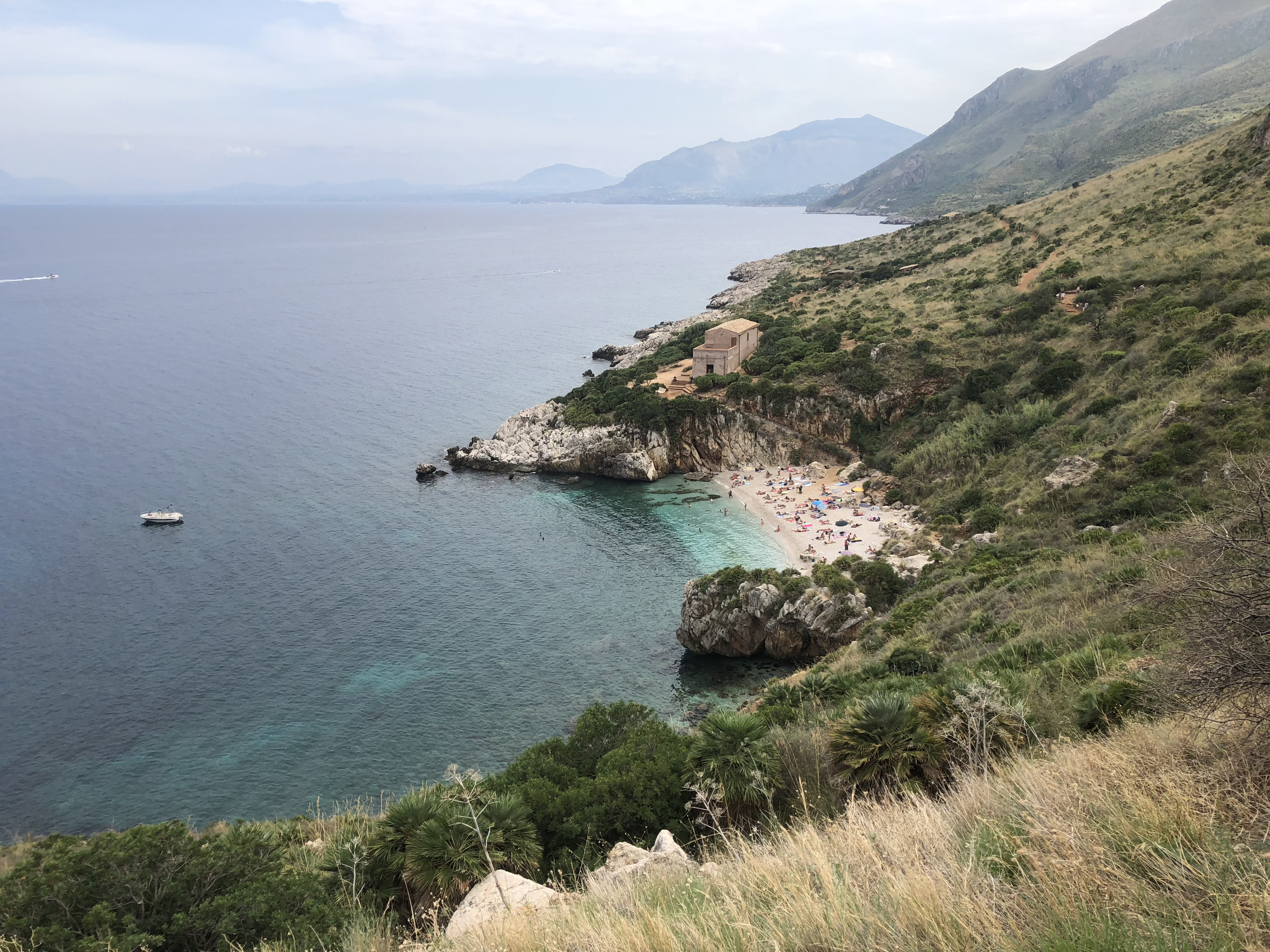
Cala Tonnarella dell'Uzzo.
