= San Vito Lo Capo =

San Vito Lo Capo Santu Vitu (Sicilian)
- Comune
- Comune di San Vito Lo Capo
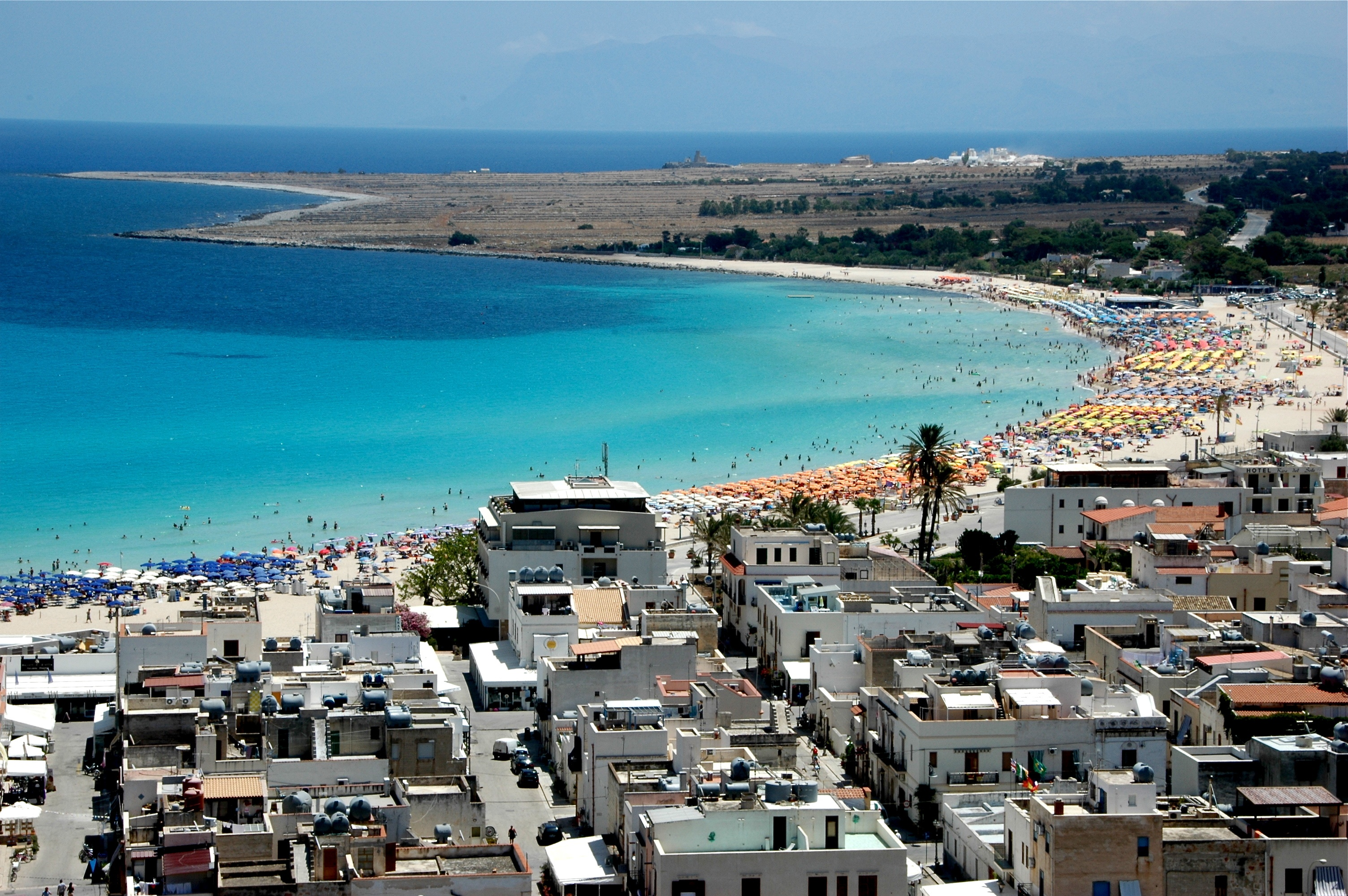

- Location within Italy Location within Sicily
- Coordinates: 38°10′N 12°45′E
- Country: Italy
- Region: Sicily
- Province: Trapani (TP)
- Frazioni: Castelluzzo, Macari

Government
  - Mayor: Giuseppe Peraino

Area
  - Total: 60.12 km^{2} (23.21 sq mi)
- Elevation: 6 m (20 ft)

Population (28 February 2017)
  - Total: 4,690
  - Density: 78.0/km^{2} (202/sq mi)
- Demonym: Sanvitesi
- Time zone: UTC+1 (CET)
  - Summer (DST): UTC+2 (CEST)
- Postal code: 91010
- Dialing code: 0923
- Patron saint: St. Vitus
- Saint day: June 15
- Website: Official website

San Vito Lo Capo (Sicilian: Santu Vitu) is a town and comune (municipality) on the north-western coast of Sicily, Southern Italy. Administratively, it is included in the province of Trapani.

The town is particularly renowned for its coastline and its natural heritage. It borders the Zingaro Nature Reserve to the east. The local beach, known for its white sand, is a major tourist destination throughout Sicily and is considered one of Italy's most beautiful.

== Geography ==
San Vito Lo Capo stands on a bay located on the peninsula of the same name, below a small promontory called Monte Monaco. The town's eastern border is provided by a small range of mountains, the northernmost of which is peaked by a large cross visible from the public beach below, the E' Bue Marino beach. Loggerhead sea turtles sometimes choose the beach to lay their eggs. With human settlements spreading, the size of the beach is shrinking.

The mountain is home to numerous caves, most of which are inaccessible without professional climbing gear. A cave, accessible by foot at the southern base of the mountain, was named "Caverna della Capra Guasto," or "Cave of the Dead Goat" by explorers Christian D'Angelo and William Spears.

To the south is the Riserva naturale dello Zingaro.

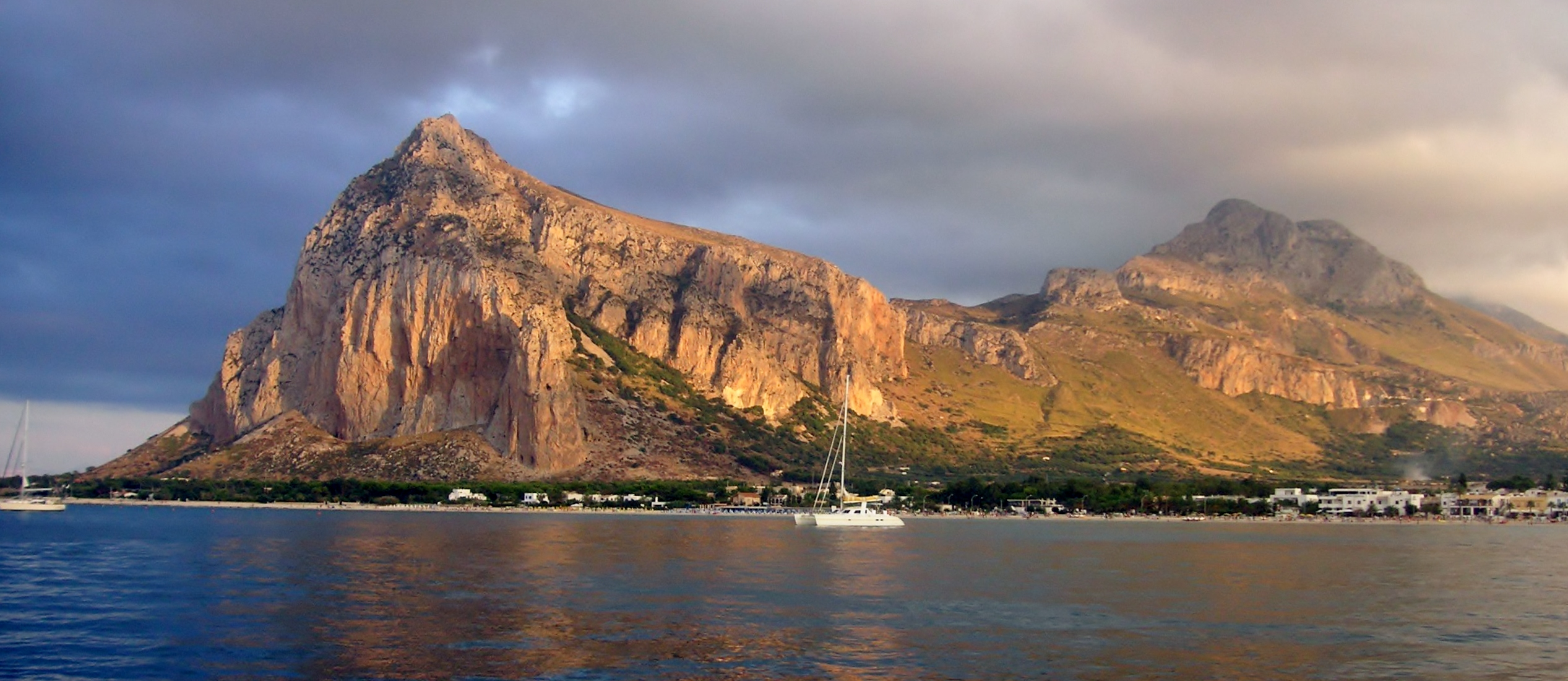
View of San Vito La Capo Marina, showing the coast, the city and the mountains

== Monuments ==
Other sights include the sanctuary-fortress, the chapel of Santa Crescenzia, the historical lighthouse, several tonnaras and the Torre dell'Usciere, a coastal watchtower.

== Rock climbing ==
San Vito Lo Capo is a well-known rock climbing destination. Along the coast on the west side of San Vito lo Capo is a coastal cliff nearly 4 kilometres (2.5 mi) long featuring as many as 1600 bolted climbing routes.

== Economy ==
The town's primary industries are tourism and agriculture, particularly olive groves owned by small farmers. Thanks to its various cultural events, the tourism season in the city lasts eight months.

== Cultural events ==
Since 1998 during the last week of September, the little town of San Vito Lo Capo has hosted the Cous Cous Fest, an international festival of Mediterranean culture and gastronomy, during which, in addition to live musical performances, there is an international couscous gastronomic competition "The Couscous World Championship".

The festival of books, authors and bougainvillea takes place in the period July–September of each year, presented by Giacomo Pilati as a series of meetings with the author in Via Venza, the town's outdoor lounge. Italian writers present their latest literary works in front of an audience. In May – after a tour of all Sicily – the International Kite Festival ends with a final stop in San Vito Lo Capo.

On 15 June, the feast of the patron St Vito Martyr takes place. Celebrations begin in the afternoon with the ancient game of the antenna in the sea, in which competing participants have to walk on a 10-metre wooden beam suspended over the sea and made slippery with a layer of soap, the goal being to grab a flag at the end of the beam. The Disembarking of the Saints (a representation of the original) on the beach of St Vito Lo Capo follows, during which three performers arrive from the sea on a small boat at sunset, each representing the young Vitus, the nurse Crescenzia and master Modesto, while the fishermen wait on the beach to welcome them. In the meantime, inside the sanctuary the statue of St Vitus is covered by the votive of the faithful; then it is solemnly presented to the faithful and carried on the shoulders by the devotees in the final procession that tours around the village. The festivities end with a fireworks display.

In October, there is the San Vito Climbing Festival, an international festival for climbers, who can climb the mountains in the area.
