= Santa Maria della Stella =

Santa Maria della Stella may refer to:

- Santa Maria della Stella, Alcamo, church in Alcamo, Italy
- Santa Maria della Stella, Alcamo Marina, church in Alcamo Marina, Italy
- Santa Maria della Stella, Naples, church in Naples, Italy
- Santa Maria della Stella, Militello in Val di Catania, church in Militello in Val di Catania, Italy
