= Oratorio di Maria Santissima della Catena, Militello in Val di Catania =

Baroque Roman Catholic church

Coordinates: 37.27344°N 14.79417°E

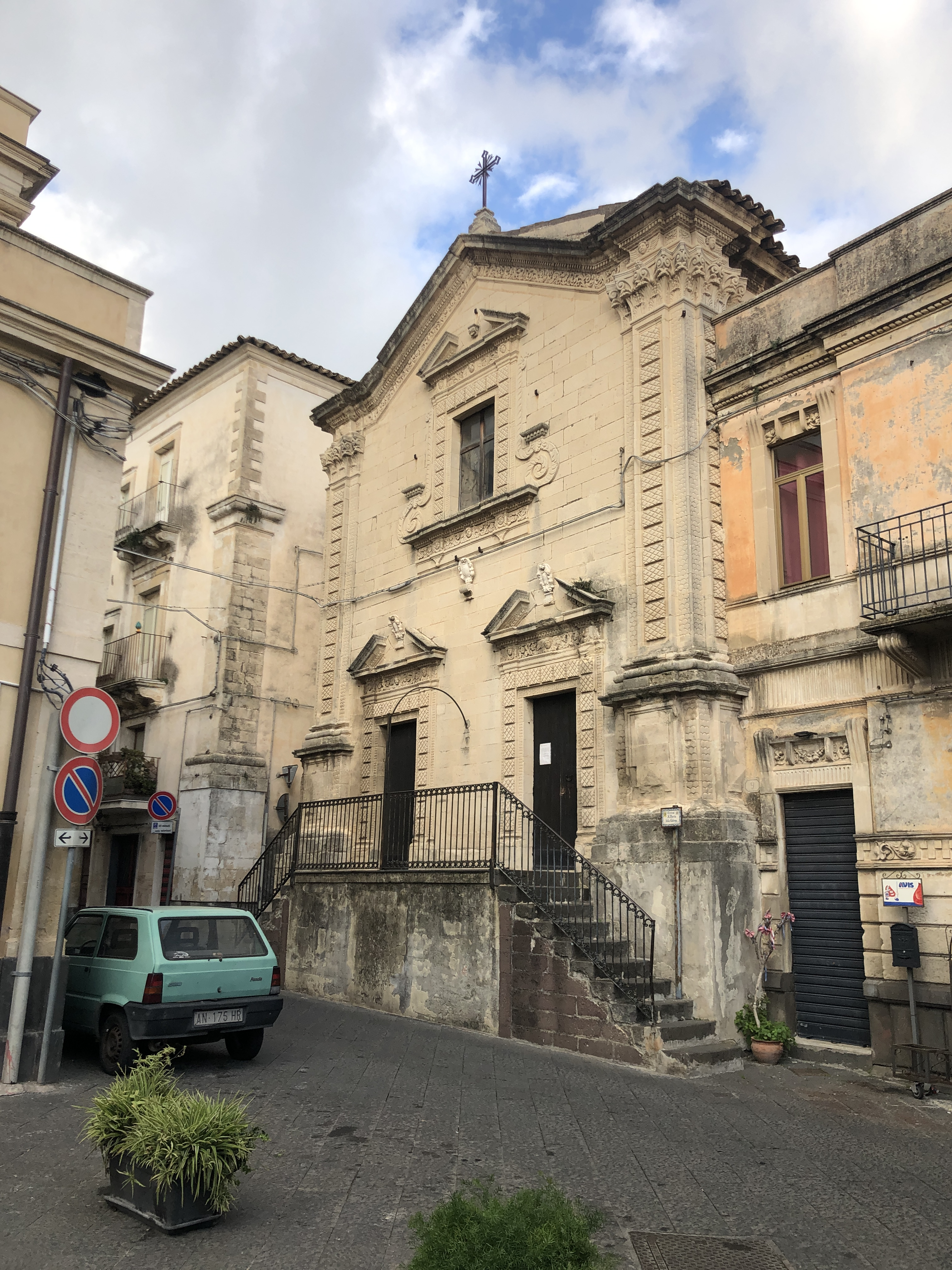

Oratorio di Maria Santissima della Catena (Oratory of Holiest Mary of the Chains) is a Roman Catholic church located in Militello in Val di Catania in the region of Sicily, Italy.

== History and description ==
The church was built in 1541 by a lay-confraternity. It then became property of the Arch-confraternity of the Santissimi Crocifisso al Calvario, founded in 1616. The confraterntity for centuries performed a re-enactment of the Via Crucis on Holy Friday. The church generally survived the 1693 earthquake, though part of the roof caved in. Refurbished during the 18th-century, construction continued with the bell-tower added in the early 20th-century. The single nave is richly decorated with stucco statues, each in their individual niche, of twelve canonized virgins either Sicilian or venerated in Sicily: Agata, Apollonia, Agrippina, Anastasia, Barbara, Sofia, Rosalia, Margherita, Febronia, Lucia, Caterina, and Maddalena. The highly decorated wooden ceiling dates to 1674. The church organ dates to 1802. The double ramp stairs before the facade were added in 1887. The treasures of the church are now housed in the Museo San Nicolò, located near the Chiesa Madre.
