= Sant'Antonio da Padova, Militello in Val di Catania =

Baroque Roman Catholic church

Coordinates: 37.2°N 14.7°E

Sant'Antonio da Padova is a Roman Catholic church located in Militello in Val di Catania in the region of Sicily, Italy.

== History and description ==
The church was built at the site of an aedicule at a spot where the Franciscan Saint Anthony of Padua himself rested in 1222, during a trip to Sicily, while traveling from Lentini to Vizzini. A fraternity developed dedicated to the veneration of the Saint, and they commissioned this church in 1503, with a chapel added in 1574, dedicated to the Holy Sepulcher. The church has a single nave with a small cupola. Outside is a weathercock decorated with an elephant. Damaged in the earthquake of 1693, the belltower was replaced in 1716. The church underwent refurbishment and enlargement, including a chapel to housed the icon of Saint Anthony. Again damaged by the 1838 earthquake, have led the church to have significant structural problems. The icons have been moved to either the duomo of the town or the Museo San Nicolò. The latter holds depictions of the Marian image of Madonna delle Rose (or Madonna di Monserrato) sculpted by Matteo Frazzetto and an image of San Biagio painted in the mid-17th century by Giovanni Battista Baldanza.

== See also ==
- 16th-century Western domes
