= Alcamo Marina =

- Hamlet
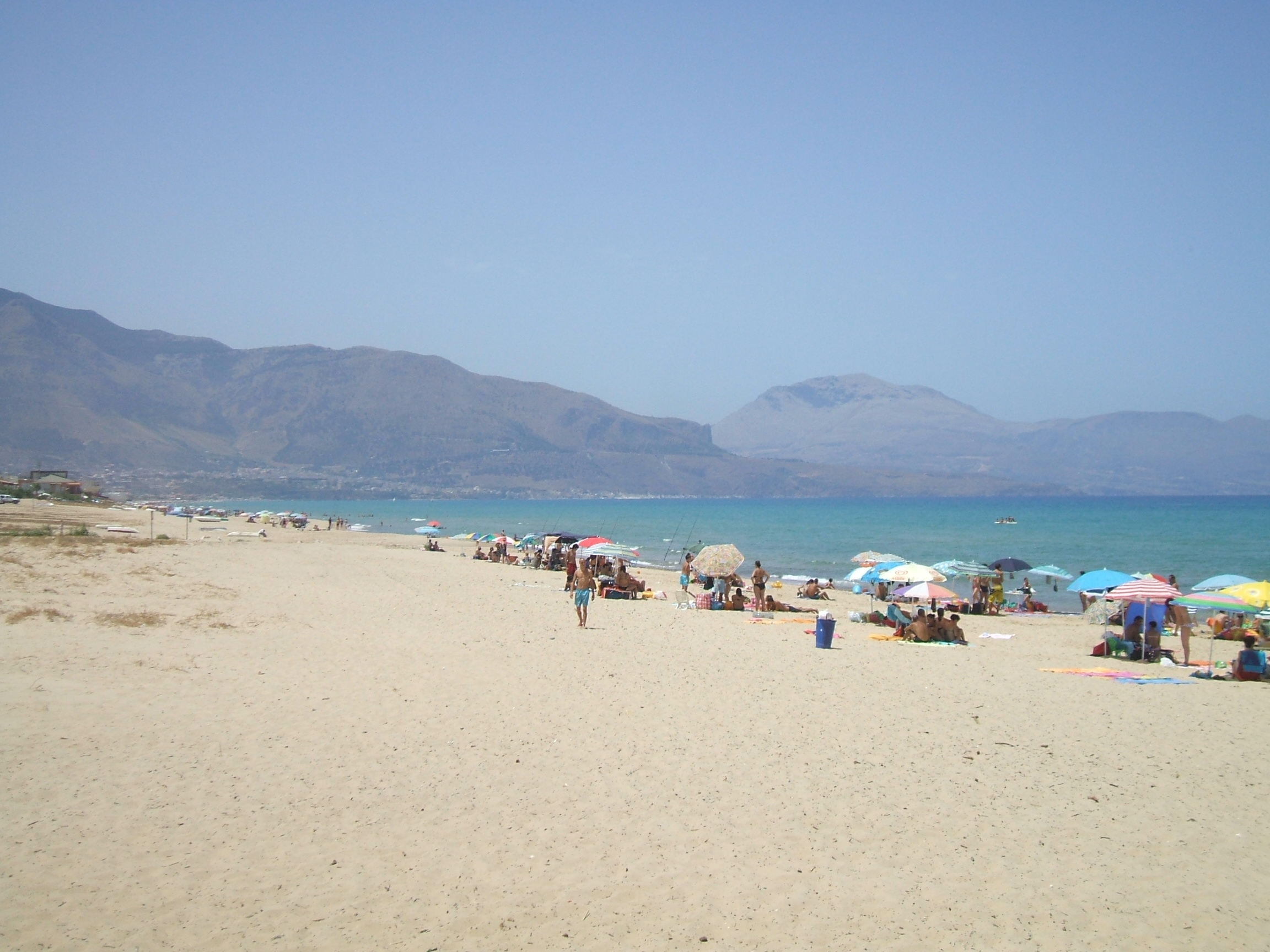
- Alcamo Marina’s beach
- Interactive map of Alcamo Marina
- Coordinates: 38.028°N 12.937°E
- Country: Italy
- Region: Sicily
- Province: Trapani
- Elevation: 52 m (171 ft)
- Time zone: +1
- Postal code: 91011
- Area code: 0924

Alcamo Marina is a seaside resort in the north-western part of Sicily and in the town territory of Alcamo. It is situated 6 km far from it, about 5 km from the small town of Castellammare del Golfo, 16 km from the village of Scopello, and 49 km from the famous seaside resort of San Vito Lo Capo. Alcamo Marina is characterized by a very fine, golden sand beach about 10 km long, absolutely free (except for some little tracts that people can cross near hotels, lidos, etc.).

During the summer season Alcamo Marina is very populated: in fact there are a lot of holiday houses (both near the beach and on the hills overlooking it), a hotel and various bed and breakfast.

== Geography ==
=== Territory ===
The territory of Alcamo Marina is bounded by the stream Finocchio on the east (near Balestrate), the river San Bartolomeo on the west (near Castellammare del Golfo), the Tyrrhenian Sea on the north and Alcamo on the south. Going from east towards west, the territory of Alcamo Marina is subdivided into different "zones":

- " Contrada Calatubo" (called also zona Aleccia by residents), including the wood "Le macchie" near the beach and the remains of an ancient castle (called "castello di Calatubo" too), located in the area between Alcamo and Balestrate;
- "Contrada Canalotto"; with the so-called “fosso Canalotto"in the middle and the deep valley Molinella separating it from contrada Calatubo. The area further west is called "zona Battigia" by residents;
- "Contrada Plaia";
- "Contrada Magazzinazzi", about a hundred metres before the river San Bartolomeo, connecting Alcamo Marina to the beach of Castellammare del Golfo (in Trapani Province).
- "Contrada Foggia", south of contrada Magazinazzi.

The streams Giovenco, Placati and Stellino cross this territory from south northwards.

Alcamo Marina is crossed by the railway Palermo-Trapani, which runs near the beach. The railway bounds a narrow strip more downhill, nearer to the sea which is called "sotto linea" (that is "below the railway"), while the biggest part of Alcamo Marina’s territory is situated above the railway and is called "sopra linea"(that is "above the railway"). Pedestrians can cross the railway through different flyovers and subways, while cars and motorbikes can cross it through level crossings and an underpass near the Battigia zone.

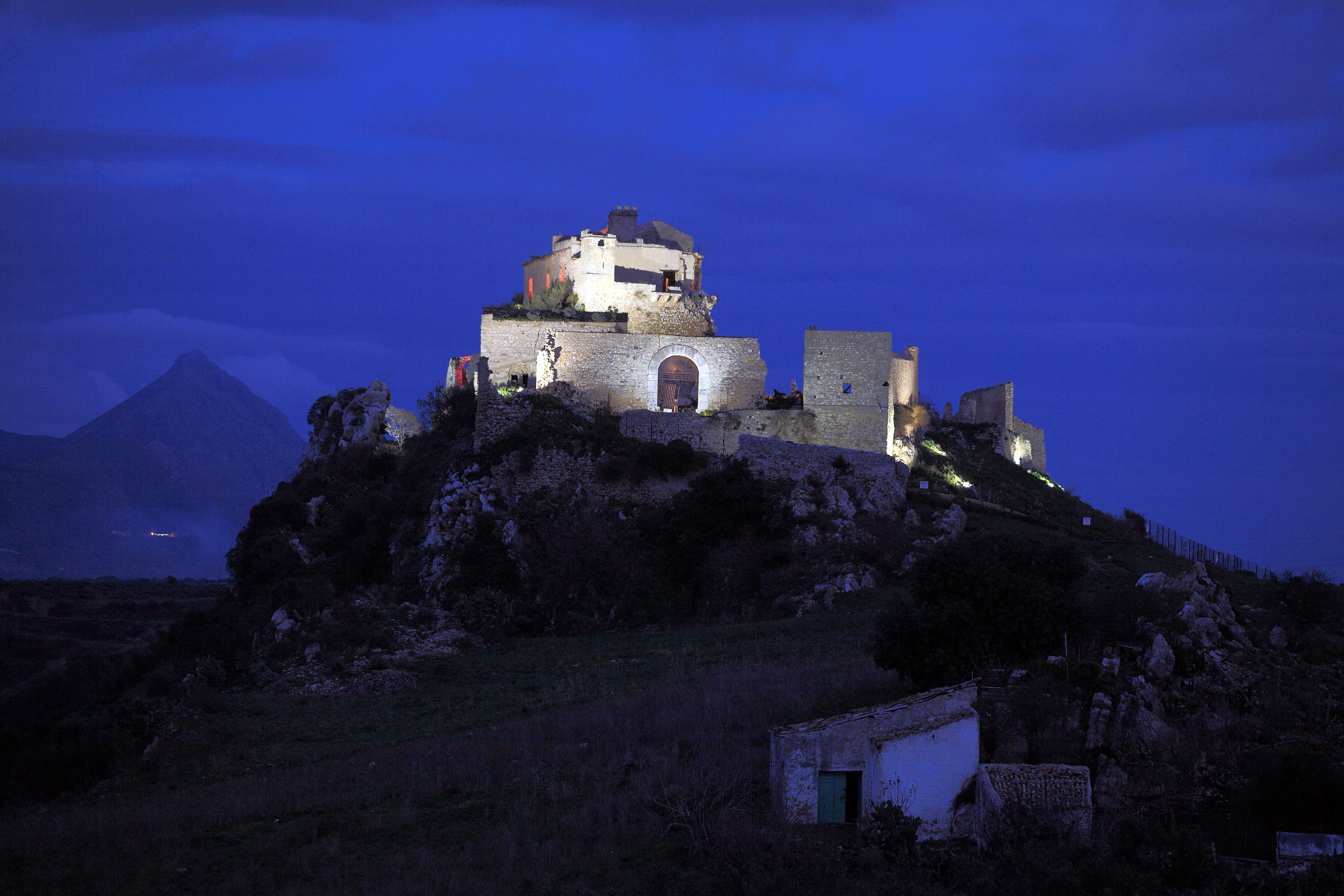
The Castle of Calatubo

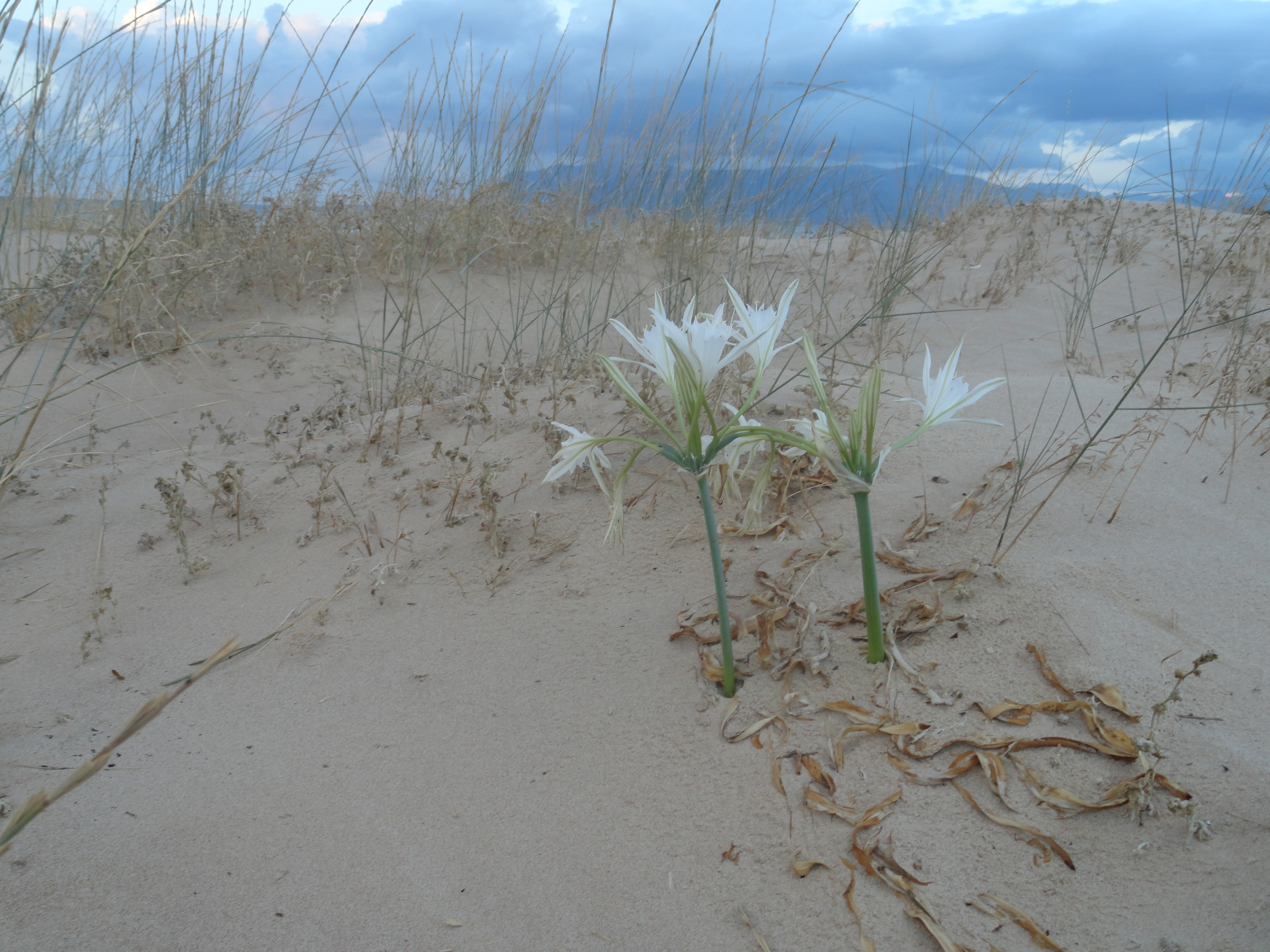
Gigli marini

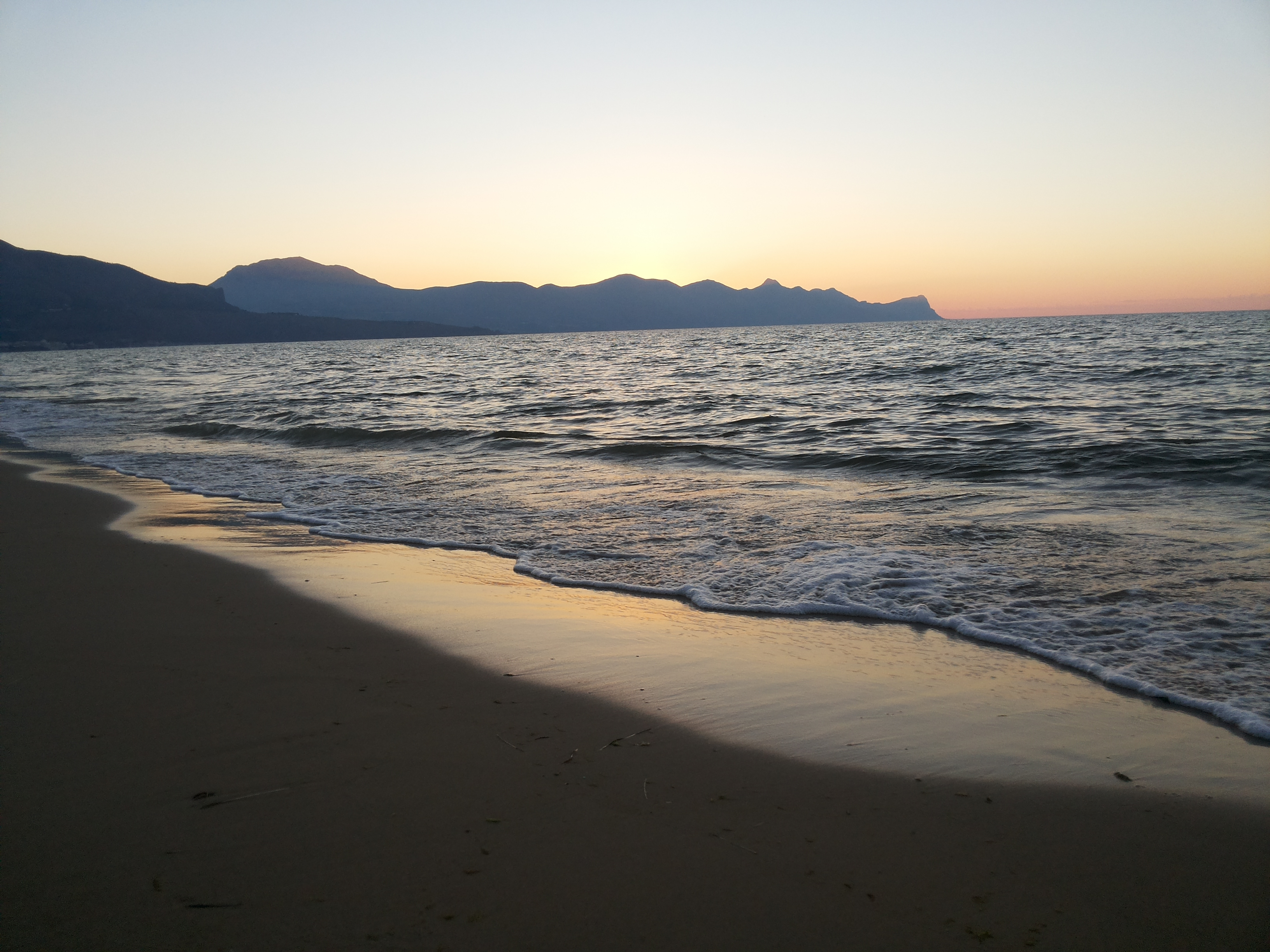
Sunset at contrada Canalotti

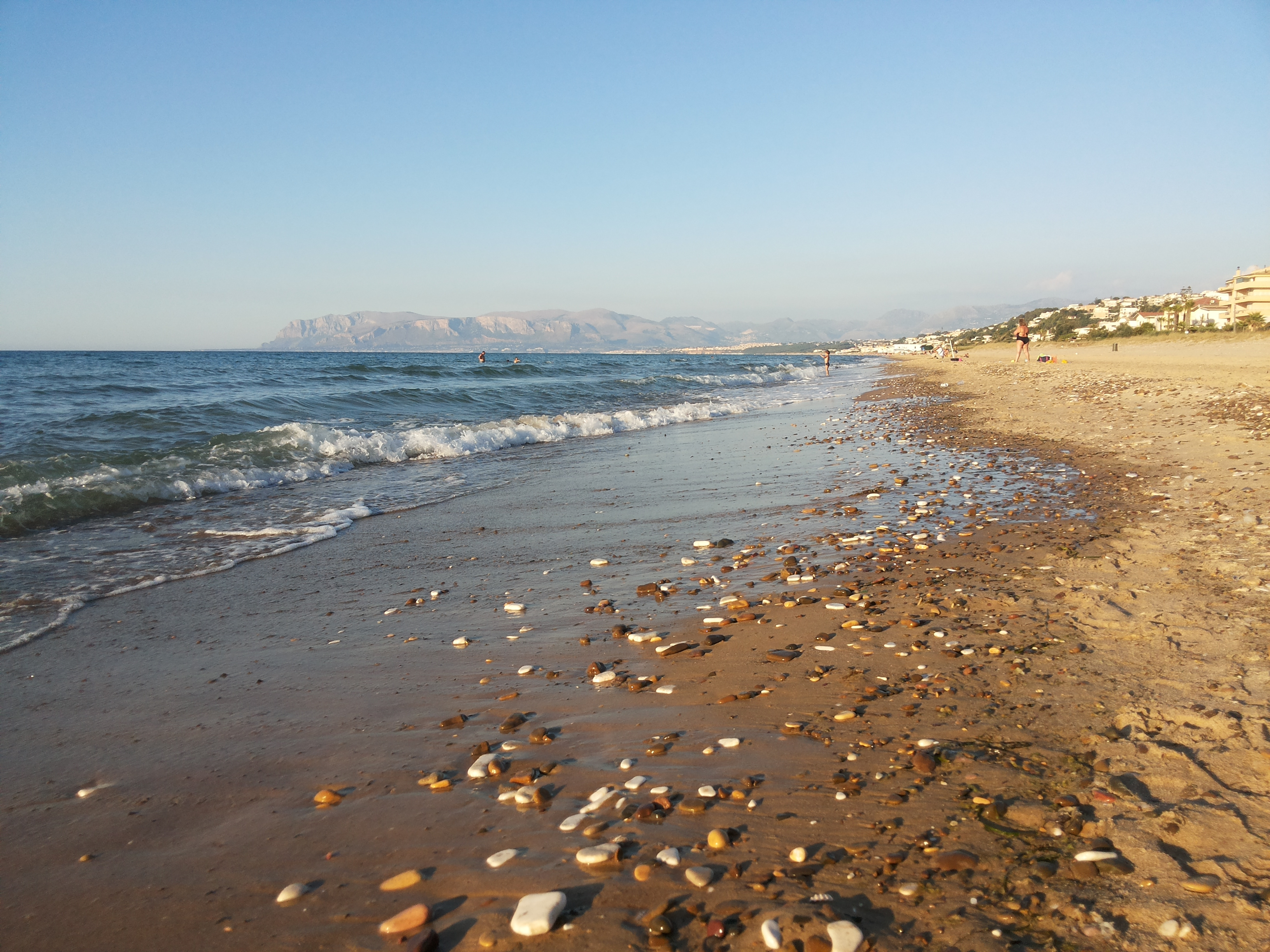
The beach at contrada Magazzinazzi

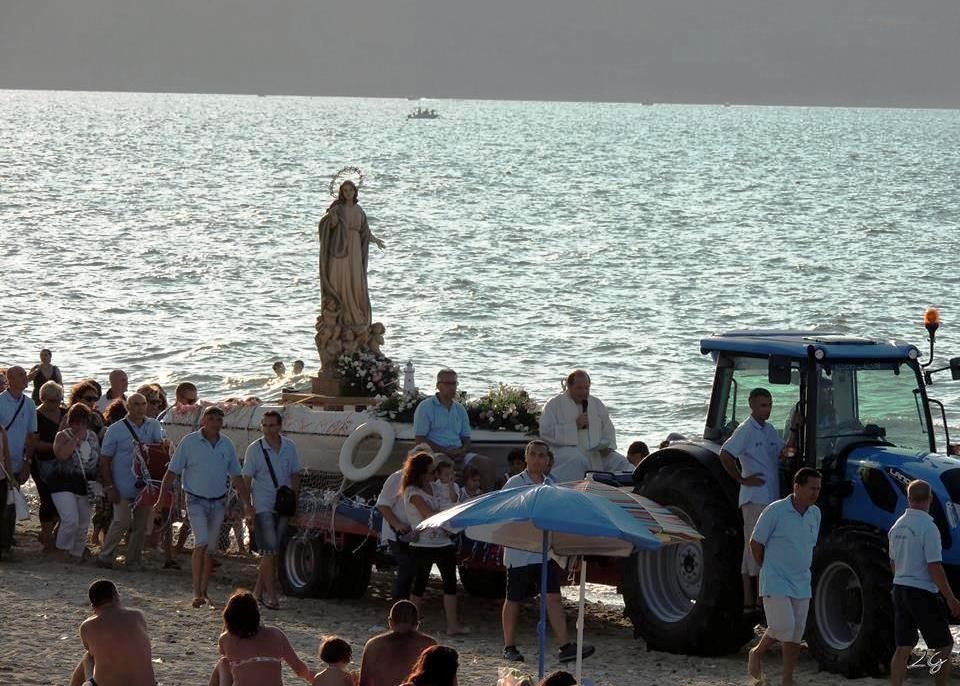
Procession of Maria Santissima Assunta, 15 August

== History ==
=== Origins ===
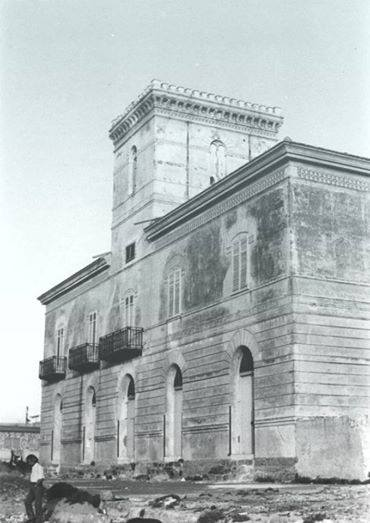
The ancient building for tuna fishing activities located in Alcamo Marina.

The construction of its first buildings was related to its being a location for tuna fishing.

=== The "sack" of Alcamo Marina ===
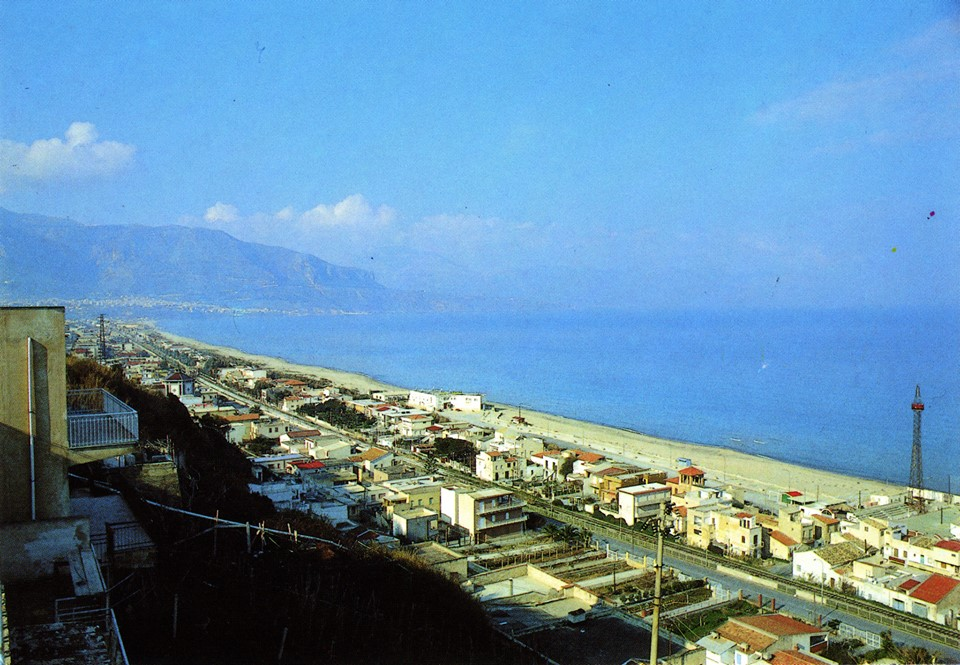
An old panoramic view of Alcamo Marina, before property speculation and unauthorized building phenomenon reached the peak, reducing the width of the beach.

The Alcamo Marina area consists of high-density housing positioned near the beach and on the hills behind it, which are composed of recent limestone and sandstone.

At the end of the fifties and beginning of the sixties, as happened with the "sack of Palermo", this area was actually sacrificed to a big property speculation and to unauthorized building, with consequences which did not delay to arrive. In fact, in addition to the damage done because of the non-exploitation of this area for touristic purposes, there were also the environmental deterioration produced by the striking urban migration and the structural damages arising for the existing buildings, above all in those which had been built on the slopes with a high risk of hydrogeological instability, already showing widespread signs of structural failure which oblige the owners to frequent and expensive works to make their houses safe.

Several criticisms have been moved at the time to the choice of lotting out the waterfront to build, because it would have been more correct to make a choice for a promenade serving the bathing area with a limited number of private houses in favour of hotel facilities which would have been more profitable (both on short and long term) and would have given a huge economic and occupational return thanks to the characteristics of the surrounding territory and the length of this beach.

=== The carabinieris' small post slaughter ===
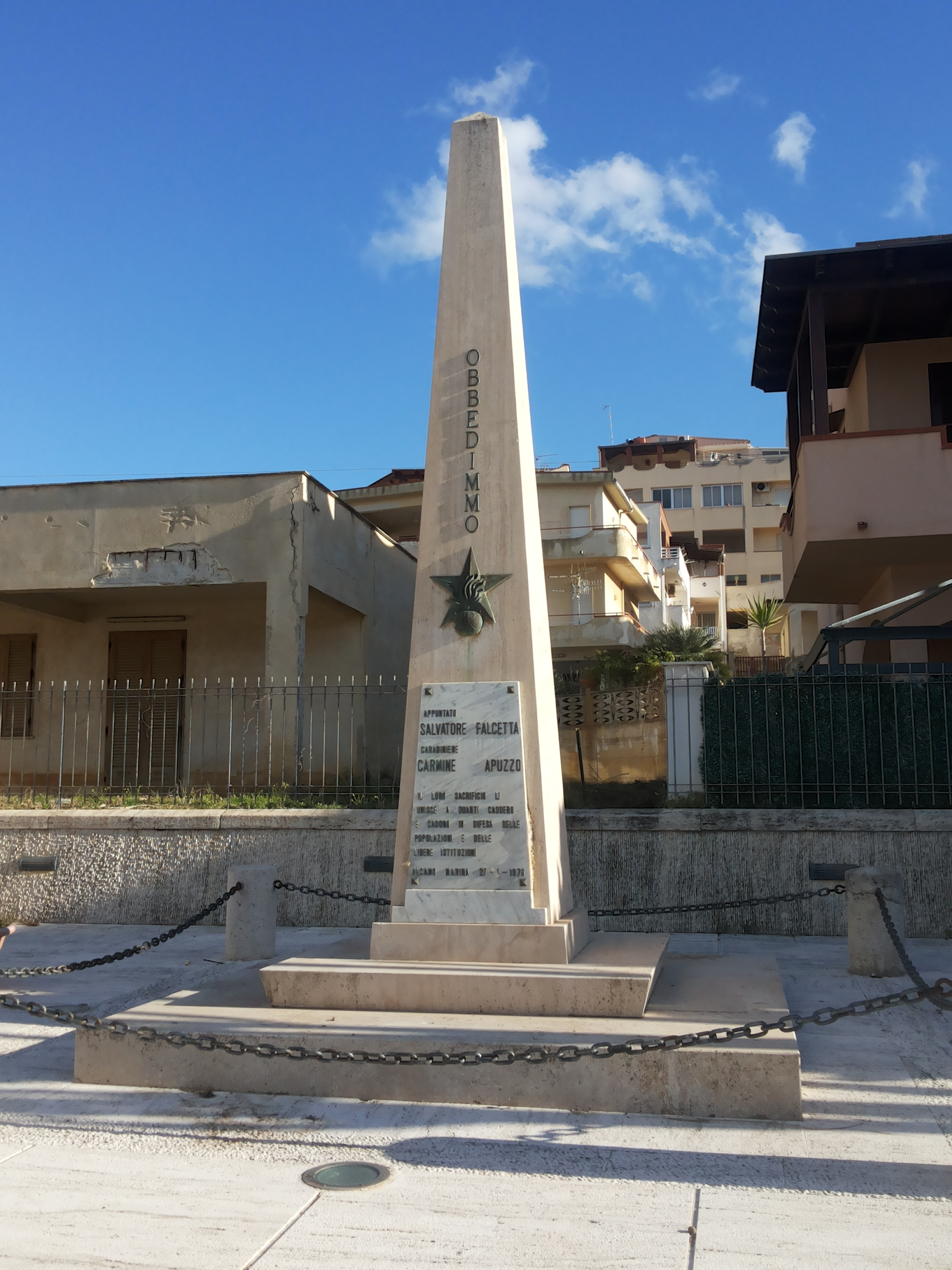
The commemorative monument in memory of the carabinieris Falcetta and Apuzzo at Alcamo Marina (in Via del Mare).

On 27 January 1976 it occurred the so-called "Alcamo Marina's slaughter": two carabinieris, the nineteen years old Carmine Apuzzo and the lance-corporal Salvatore Falcetta, were killed while sleeping in the small post.

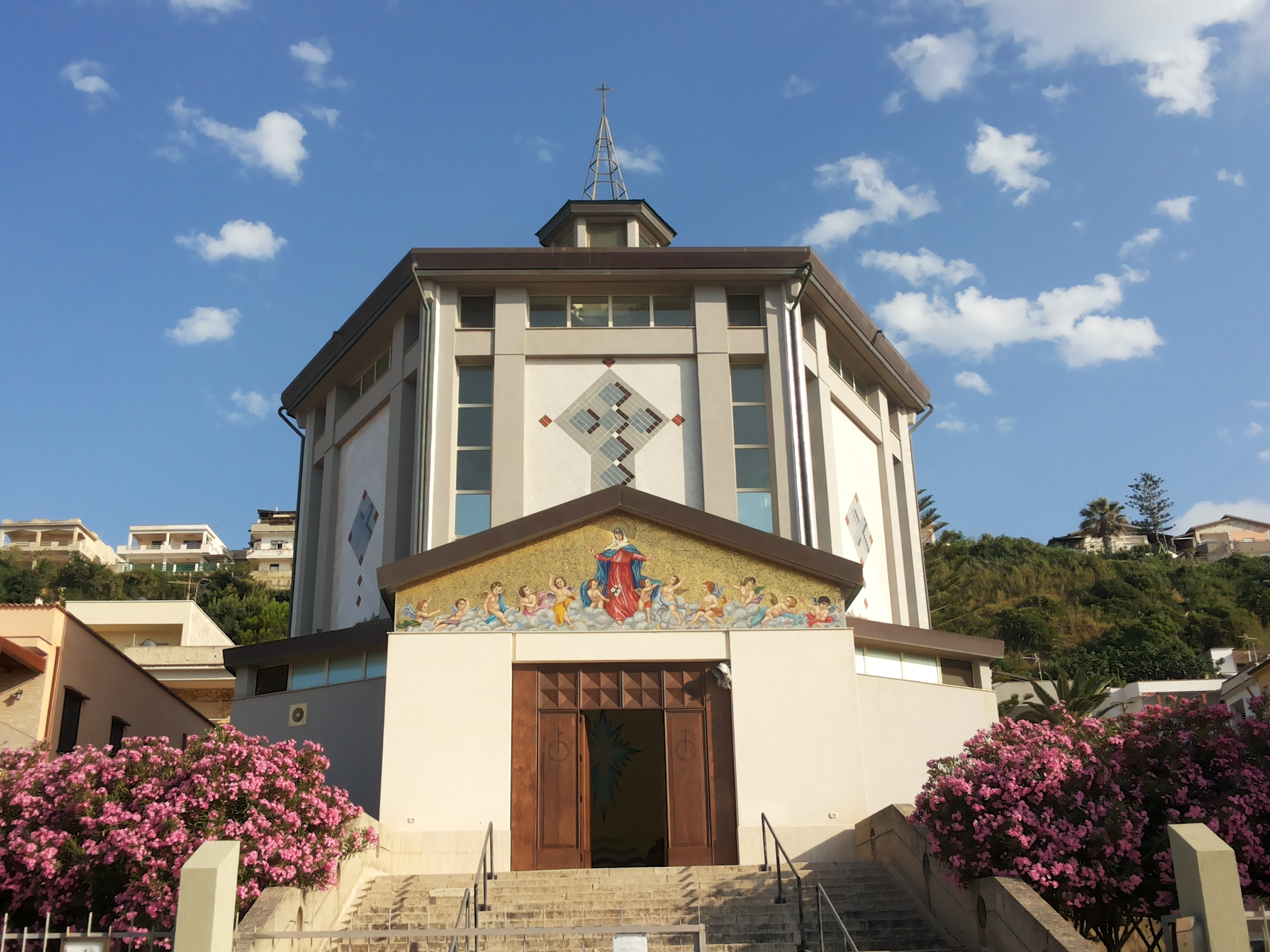
Church of Santa Maria della Stella

=== Attempts of the environment revaluation ===
In 2011 they inaugurated a long wooden platform in Alcamo Marina, built in order to give an access to the beach to disabled people too. However it was destroyed by the winter sea storms and it has become the subject of debates.

Since June 2014, the streets of Alcamo Marina were provided by toponyms.

== Main sights ==
=== Religious buildings ===
At Alcamo Marina there is the Chiesa di Santa Maria della Stella (also called "Stella Maris"), with a central body with a poliedric plan; you can go inside it by passing through a portal which is surmounted by a mosaic representing Santa Maria della Stella.

There is also an old small church near the Tonnara (in the Battigia area). You can also attend Mass at the Oasi Maria Regina della Famiglia locatednext to Piazzale Canalotto.

=== Archeological sites ===
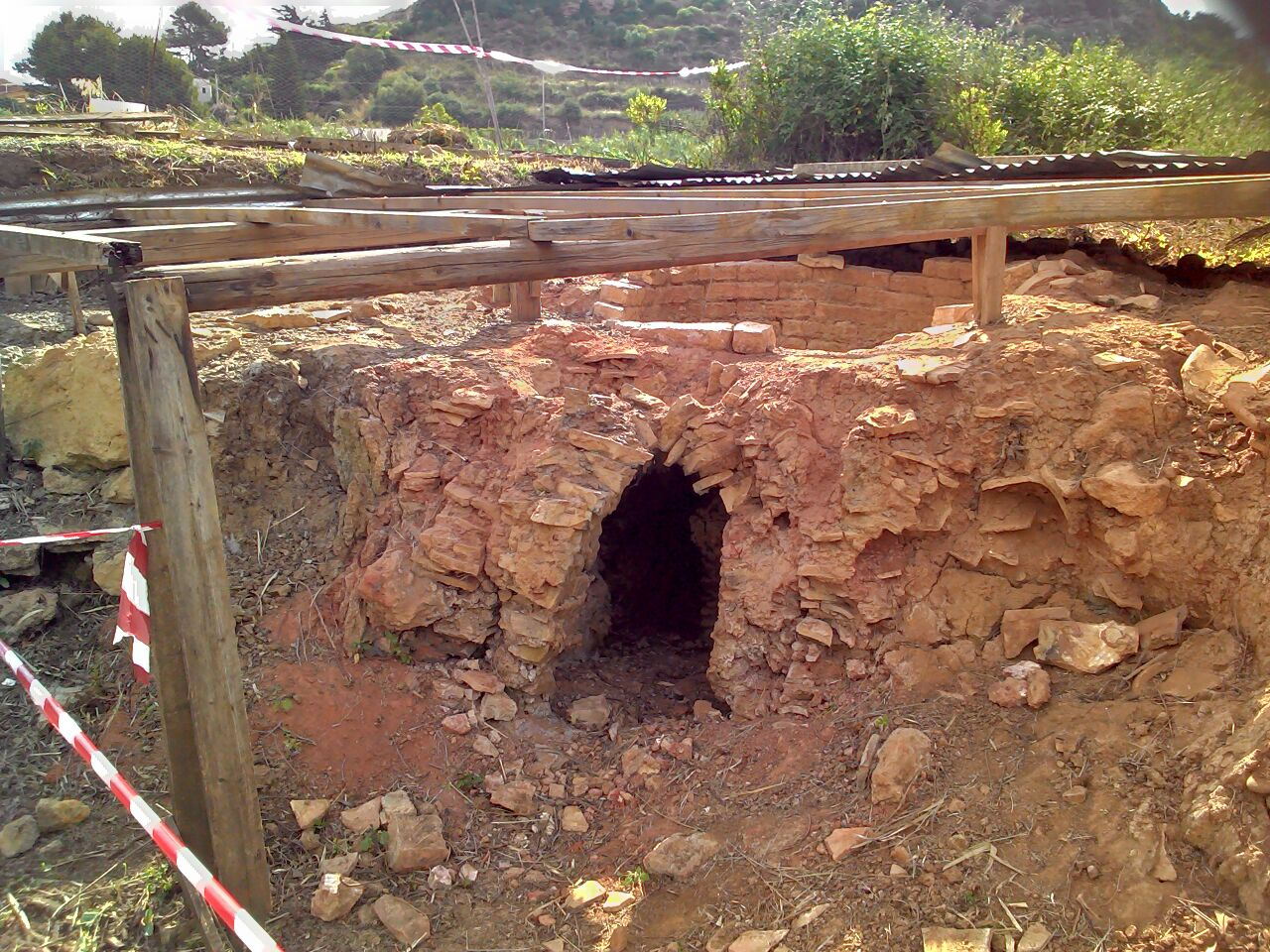
Remains of old Roman furnaces in Alcamo Marina.

Near contrada Magazinazzi, further to the excavations made between 2003 and 2005, they found the remains of old Roman furnaces which were used for the production of tiles and bricks.

=== Paleontologic sites ===
The territory of Alcamo Marina is full of fossil shells dating back to the Inferior Pleistocene and belonging to the geologic formation called "Sintema of Marsala". Some of the present species are: Artica islandica, Chlamis multistriata and Ostrea.

For this purpose, on 15 July 2014 at Alcamo Marina (in the Calatubo zone) they created a geologic point and a paleontologic laboratory called "Fossilandia".

=== Natural areas ===
The sea lily, a plant of the family Amaryllidaceae blooming in summer, grows on the dunes of Alcamo Marina.

Other plants naturally growing on the coastal dunes in Alcamo Marina are Cakile maritima and Agropyrum junceum. The seeds of these plants are transported here by the wind.

== Economy ==
As Alcamo Marina is a seaside resort, the main economic activities are based on entertainments and restoration (rented holidays houses, pizzerias, restaurants and bars).

== Transports and infrastructures ==
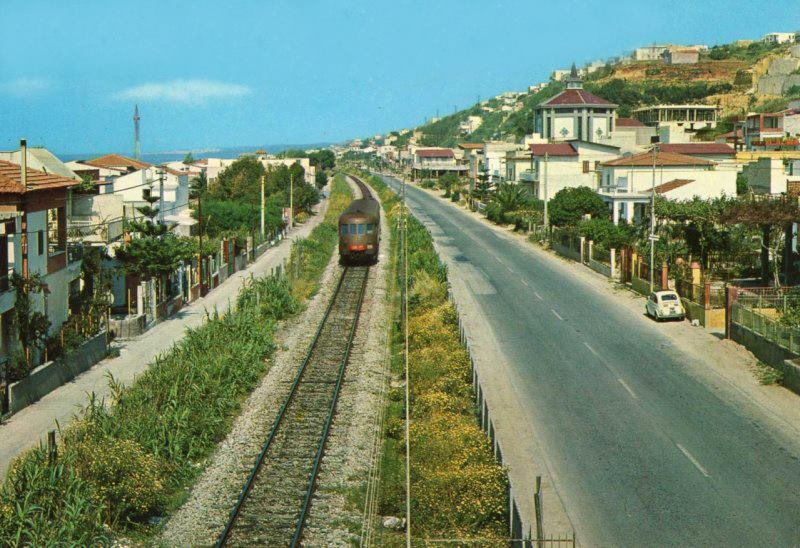
A view of the railway which crosses Alcamo Marina (1970-1980).

By car - Alcamo Marina is served by the A29 Motorway Palermo-Mazara del Vallo with two junctions: Alcamo Est (at about 3 km distance) and Castellammare del Golfo (at about 4 km).

Trains - The railway station of Castellammare del Golfo (at about 3 km from the centre of Alcamo Marina) is situated on the railway line Palermo-Trapani and is connected to Alcamo Marina and Alcamo by buses in the summer season.

Buses - The town bus Alcamo-Alcamo Marina runs since 15 June until September with different stops, including the railway station. Besides there are coaches for Palermo and San Vito lo Capo stopping at Alcamo Marina.

Alcamo Marina is at about 40 km. far from "Falcone-Borsellino" airport at Palermo-Punta Raisi and about 50 km. from the airport "Vincenzo Florio" at Trapani-Birgi.

== See also ==
- Alcamo
- Gulf of Castellammare
- Castellammare del Golfo
- Balestrate
