= Militello in Val di Catania =

Militello in Val di Catania Militeḍḍu (Sicilian)
- Comune
- Comune di Militello in Val di Catania
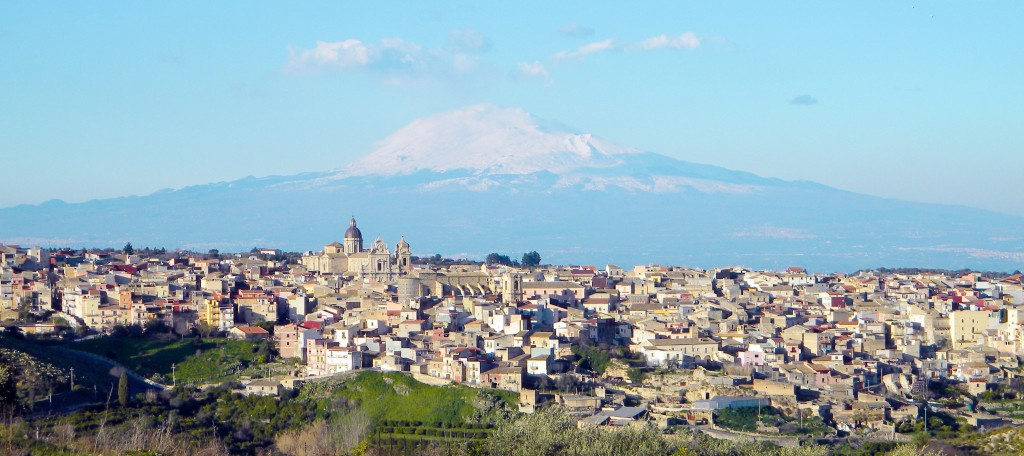

- Coat of arms

- Location within Sicily Location within Italy
- Coordinates: 37°17′N 14°47′E
- Country: Italy
- Region: Sicily
- Metropolitan city: Catania (CT)

Government
  - Mayor: Giovanni Burtone

Area
  - Total: 62.2 km^{2} (24.0 sq mi)
- Elevation: 413 m (1,355 ft)

Population (2024)
  - Total: 6,602
  - Density: 106/km^{2} (275/sq mi)
- Demonym: Militellesi
- Time zone: UTC+1 (CET)
  - Summer (DST): UTC+2 (CEST)
- Postal code: 95043
- Dialing code: 095
- Patron saint: Santissimo Salvatore and Santa Maria della Stella
- Saint day: 18 August and 8 September
- Website: www.comune.militello.ct.it

UNESCO World Heritage Site
- Part of: Late Baroque Towns of the Val di Noto (South-Eastern Sicily)
- Criteria: Cultural: (i)(ii)(iv)(v)
- Reference: 1024rev-003
- Inscription: 2002 (26th Session)
- Area: 1.43 ha (154,000 sq ft)
- Buffer zone: 27.48 ha (2,958,000 sq ft)

Militello in Val di Catania (lit. 'Militello in the Province of Catania'; Sicilian: Militeḍḍu) is a comune (municipality) in the Metropolitan City of Catania in the Italian region of Sicily, located about 160 kilometres (99 mi) southeast of Palermo and about 35 kilometres (22 mi) southwest of Catania, on the last slopes of the Hyblaean Mountains. It has a railway station on the line Catania-Caltagirone-Gela. It is one of I Borghi più belli d'Italia ('The most beautiful villages of Italy').

== History ==
Despite remains of prehistorical settlements and legends of a Roman foundation, the first mention of Militello dates from 1000 AD, when it became a marquisate under the Cammarana.

The golden age of Militello was during the early 17th century, under the government of Prince Francesco Branciforte. The city was destroyed by an earthquake in 1693, but the subsequent restoration added numerous architectural and artistic works of art.

== Monuments and places of interest ==
In 2002, UNESCO recognized the Val di Noto as a World Heritage Site, including, in addition to Militello in Val di Catania, the cities of Caltagirone, Catania, Modica, Noto, Palazzolo Acreide, Ragusa, and Scicli, the so-called "Late Baroque Cities of the Val di Noto."

=== Churches ===
- Mother Church of San Nicolò and Santissimo Salvatore (18th century)
- Santa Maria la Vetere, with a 1506 portal by Antonello Gagini
- Madonna della Catena (17th century), with a 16th-century niche
- Abbey of San Benedetto (17th century)
- Sant'Antonio da Padova, with a bell tower from 1719
- Santa Maria della Stella (18th century)
- Santissimi Angeli Custodi late 18th century, with a precious ceramics pavement

=== Palaces ===
- Barresi Branciforte Castle, with the Fountain of the Nymph Zizza (17th century)
- Palazzo Baldanza-Denaro (17th century)
- Palazzo Niceforo (18th century)
- Palazzo Baldanza (19th century)
- Palazzo Majorana della Nicchiara

== Demographic evolution ==
Historical population

Year	Pop.	±%
1861	9,752	—
1871	10,017	+2.7%
1881	10,699	+6.8%
1901	11,506	+7.5%
1911	11,736	+2.0%
1921	12,831	+9.3%

Year	Pop.	±%
1931	10,916	−14.9%
1936	11,314	+3.6%
1951	12,053	+6.5%
1961	11,272	−6.5%
1971	10,359	−8.1%
1981	10,353	−0.1%

Year	Pop.	±%
1991	10,185	−1.6%
2001	8,204	−19.5%
2011	7,807	−4.8%
2021	6,796	−12.9%

Source: Data from ISTAT

=== Foreign ethnicities and minorities ===
There were 73 foreigners residing in Militello as of 1 January 2025, representing 1.1% of the resident population. The largest foreign community is that from Romania, with 43.8% of all foreigners present in the area.

== Culture ==
Since 2022, the city has been part of the First World Mediterranean Lifestyle Park project, along with 103 other cities in central Sicily.

=== Schools and education ===
- State Comprehensive School "Pietro Carrera". Includes: Preschool, Elementary School, and Middle School. Upper Secondary Education. Includes: AFM (Administration, Finance, and Marketing), BTS (Bio-Technology and Health) and the Art School.
- Angelo Majorana" Municipal Library. Established in 1910, its founder was Giuseppe Musumeci Ristagno, Head of Education. It holds approximately 40,000 volumes, including an antique collection of over 2,000 volumes dating from the late 15th to the early 20th century. Added to this is a rich collection of vinyl records, CDs, and video cassettes housed in the multimedia room. Approximately 2,500 users are registered for borrowing. Particularly valuable are: an incunabulum from 1498 (Rosarium Sermonum by Bernarbino de' Busti) and thirty-one sixteenth-century editions, including twenty-two Venetian editions, two from Lyon, one from Palermo and one from Naples.

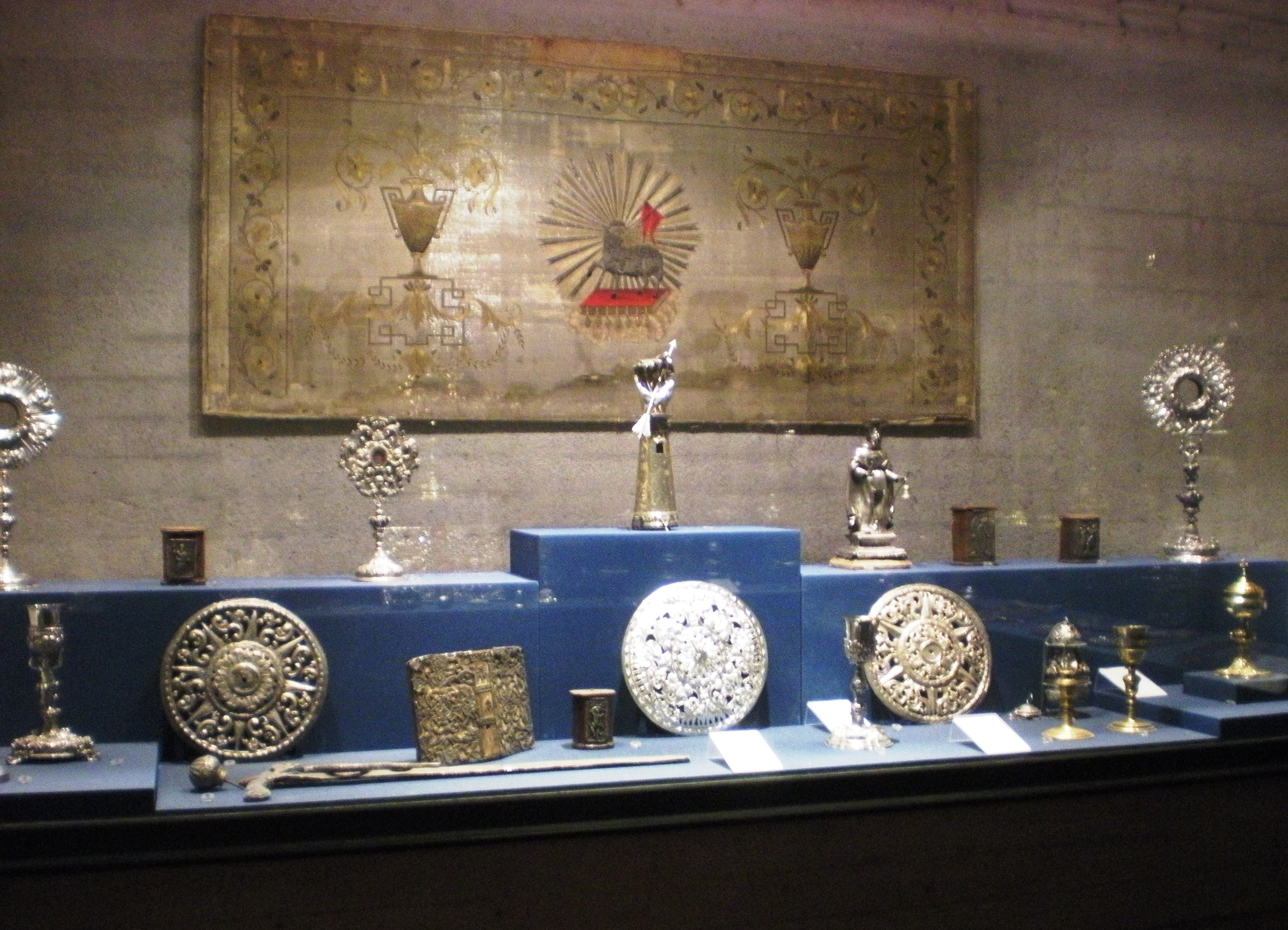
Treasury of Santa Maria della Stella.

=== Museums and places of interest ===
- Civic Museum and Historical Archive "Sebastiano Guzzone".
- Museum of Sacred Art "San Nicolò".
- Treasury of Santa Maria della Stella. Inaugurated in 1995, it displays numerous precious works of art: sacred silver furnishings (15th–18th centuries) from the parish church and its branch churches;
- Mural dedicated to Pippo Baudo. The mural that the community decided to dedicate to him is located on Via Guglielmo Marconi, right in front of the Tempio Cinema Theater.

=== Natural areas ===
- Ossena Waterfalls: these are natural waterfalls located south of the Militello area, bordering the Francofonte area (Syracuse province). These waterfalls are fed by the waters of the Oxena stream, which flows through the northeastern Hyblaean Mountains.

=== Media ===
==== Theaters and cinemas ====
In 1942, the "Tempio" Cine Teatro (named after the owner) finally saw the light of day, designed by Antonio Portuso, a surveyor from Militello, whose style was inspired by the Italian Rationalism of the time. The "Tempio" Theater was the heart of the city's cultural and artistic life until the late 1990s, when, now in disrepair, it was purchased by the Province of Catania, which radically transformed it into a new opera and drama theater designed by architect Giorgio Potenza. It has recently regained its role as an important cultural infrastructure for the city.

==== Radio, television, and curiosities ====
The local radio station is Radio Venere Militello, founded in 1978 with the contribution of several enthusiasts, which broadcasts on FM. It is also received in neighboring municipalities, digitally on the mux Media Dab channel 9B and can be streamed on the station's website. In the past, there was a local television station, Radio Audizioni Militello, which closed in the first half of the 1990s. The television host Pippo Baudo (1936–2025) was born in Militello.

== Administration ==
Period		Office holder	Party	Title	Notes
9 June 2024	in office	Giovanni Burtone	PD	Mayor	

== Notable people ==
- Pietro Carrera, chess player, historian, priest and author
- Pippo Baudo, Italian television presenter
- Nello Musumeci, Italian politician

== See also ==
- Val di Catania
