= Santa Maria della Stella, Militello in Val di Catania =

Baroque Roman Catholic church

Coordinates: 37.27173°N 14.79347°E

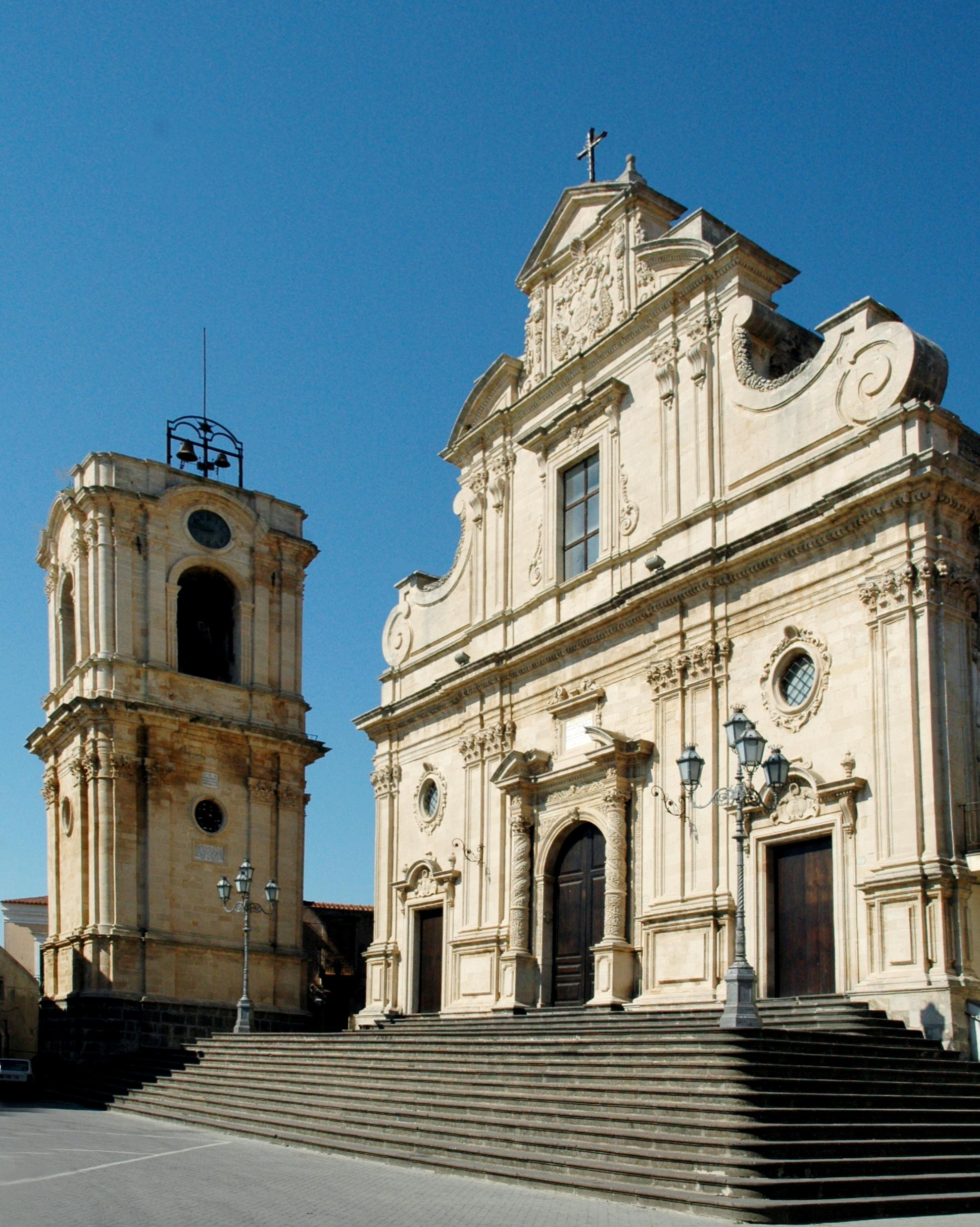
Facade and bell-tower of church

Santa Maria della Stella (St Mary of the Stars) is a Roman Catholic parish church located on Via Porta della Terra in Militello in Val di Catania in the region of Sicily, Italy.

== History and description ==
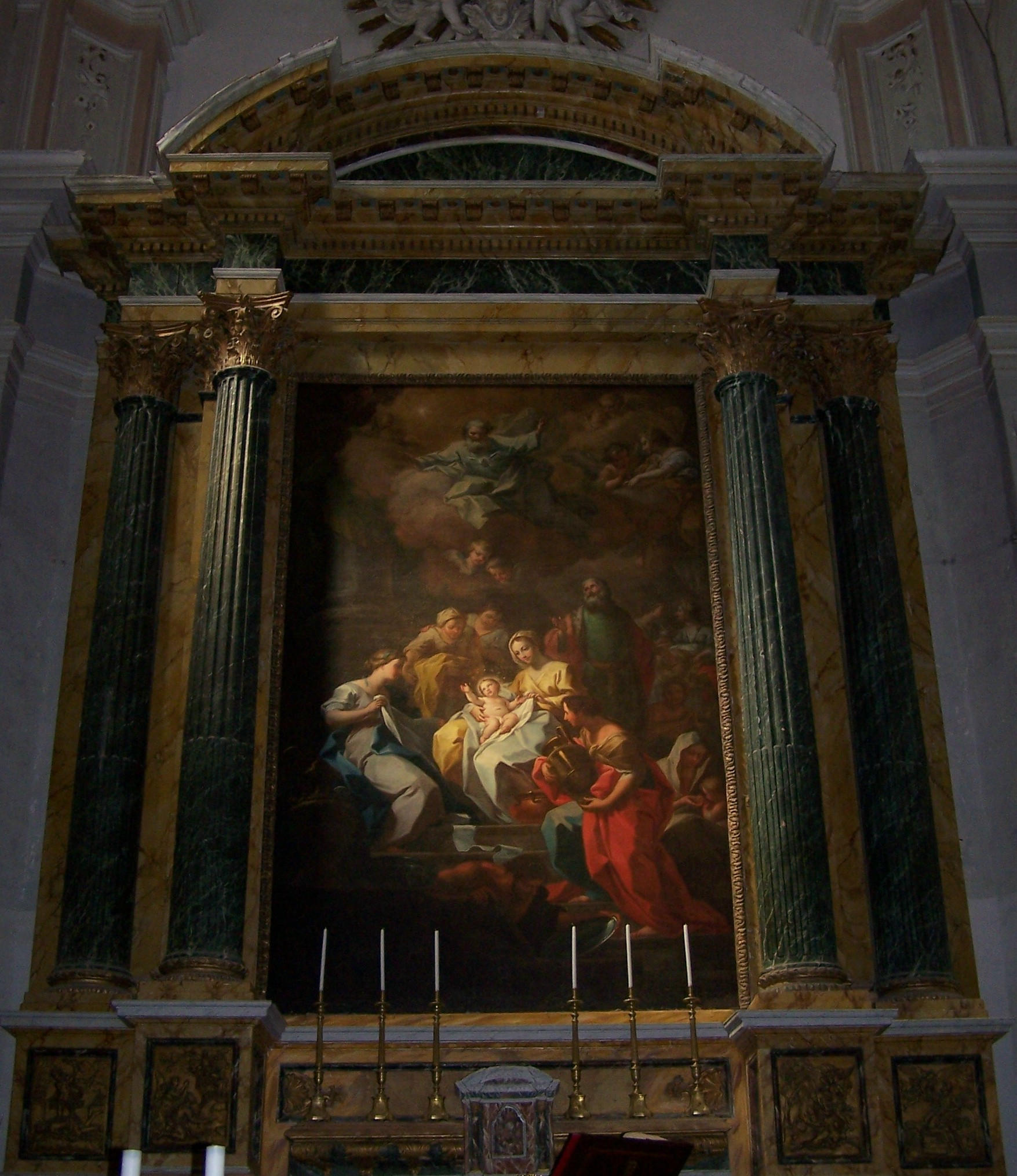
Nativity of the Virgin altarpiece by Sozzi

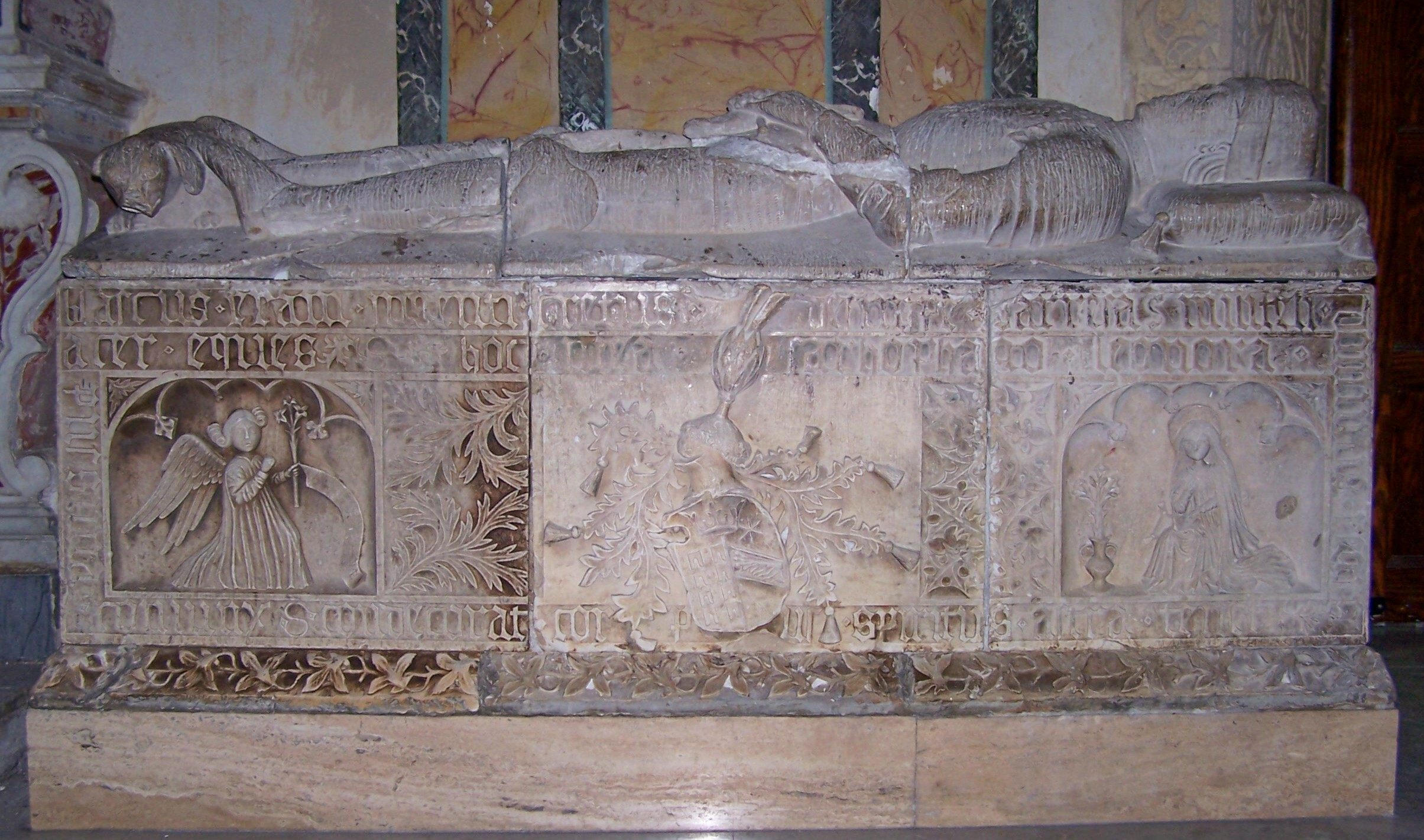
15th-century Sarcophagus of Blasco Barresi

A church of the same name was mostly destroyed by the 1693 Sicily earthquake. The remains of the prior church, including an elegant Renaissance and Romanesque portal, now an archeologic monument, are referred to as Santa Maria La Vetere. This new church was built at the prior site of the church of Sant'Antonio Abate, which was then also rebuilt adjacent. Construction or the present church took place from 1722 to 1741. The church with three naves separated by pillars, so as to strengthen the church against future earthquakes.

The architect Giuseppe Ferrara designed and helped sculpt the richly articulated facade. The detached bell-tower was begun in 1773; however, it was never completed, and the stunted building only rises two stories. The main altarpiece, carved in 1753, displays a Nativity of the Virgin by Olivio Sozzi. The third altar on the left displays a Martyrdom of St. Bartholomew (1694), commissioned by the guild of the tanners, active in Militello, in honor of their patron saint. The fourth altar on right houses a glazed terracotta depicting the Nativity by Andrea della Robbia; this work was commissioned in 1487 by Antonio Pietro Barresi, baron of Militello, for the prior church of Santa Maria della Stella. A number of works from the churches ruined by the earthquake were reused, including a Scourged Christ (17th century) from the church of Sant'Antonio Abate; a portal likely from the prior Santa Maria church, and a sarcophagus for Blasco II Barresi (15th-century) and Vincenzo Barresi, first Marquis of Militello (1567).

=== Contemporary history ===
- On September 6, 1925, it was consecrated with a solemn rite by the Bishop of Caltanissetta, Msgr. Giovanni Jacono.
- In 1929, the rectory was built next to the church, created from the demolition of the Church of Sant'Antonio Abate.
- On September 8, 1954, under the parish of Archpriest Msgr. Francesco Iatrini, the much-venerated effigy of the Madonna della Stella was crowned with a precious golden crown by the Reverend Vatican Chapter in the presence of the clergy, civil and military authorities, and representatives of the national government.
- On October 11, 1969, under the parish priest Don Sebastiano Cataldo, by decree of Msgr. Carmelo Canzonieri, Bishop of Caltagirone, the basilica was elevated to the dignity of a Marian shrine.

The church has a new chapel of the Madonna della Stella, patron saint of Militello, designed by Giuseppe Pagnano and built in the 1980s. Two bronze angels by Emilio Greco make up the doors of the marble doors. Giuseppe Barone painted the frescoes (1947) of the vault in the chapel of the Virgin of the Assumption.

- On September 16, 1984, in the presence of His Excellency Monsignor Vittorio Mondello, Bishop of Caltagirone, the ceremony of handing over the city to the Madonna della Stella took place.

After the earthquake of December 13, 1990, also known as the Santa Lucia earthquake, the church underwent extensive structural consolidation and restoration work.

- On June 28, 2002, the monument was included on the UNESCO World Heritage List.
- In 2016, the Sanctuary underwent major restoration work.
- Since February 22, 2018, the Sanctuary of Santa Maria della Stella has been linked by a bond of spiritual affinity to the Liberian Papal Basilica of Santa Maria Maggiore.
- On September 8, 2024, at the end of the Pontifical Solemnity, the mayor of Militello donated the Keys to the City of Militello to Our Lady of the Star, Principal Patroness.
