= Santa Maria della Stella, Alcamo Marina =

Church in Alcamo Marina, Sicily, Italy

Santa Maria della Stella
- Chiesa di Maria Santissima della Stella (Italian)
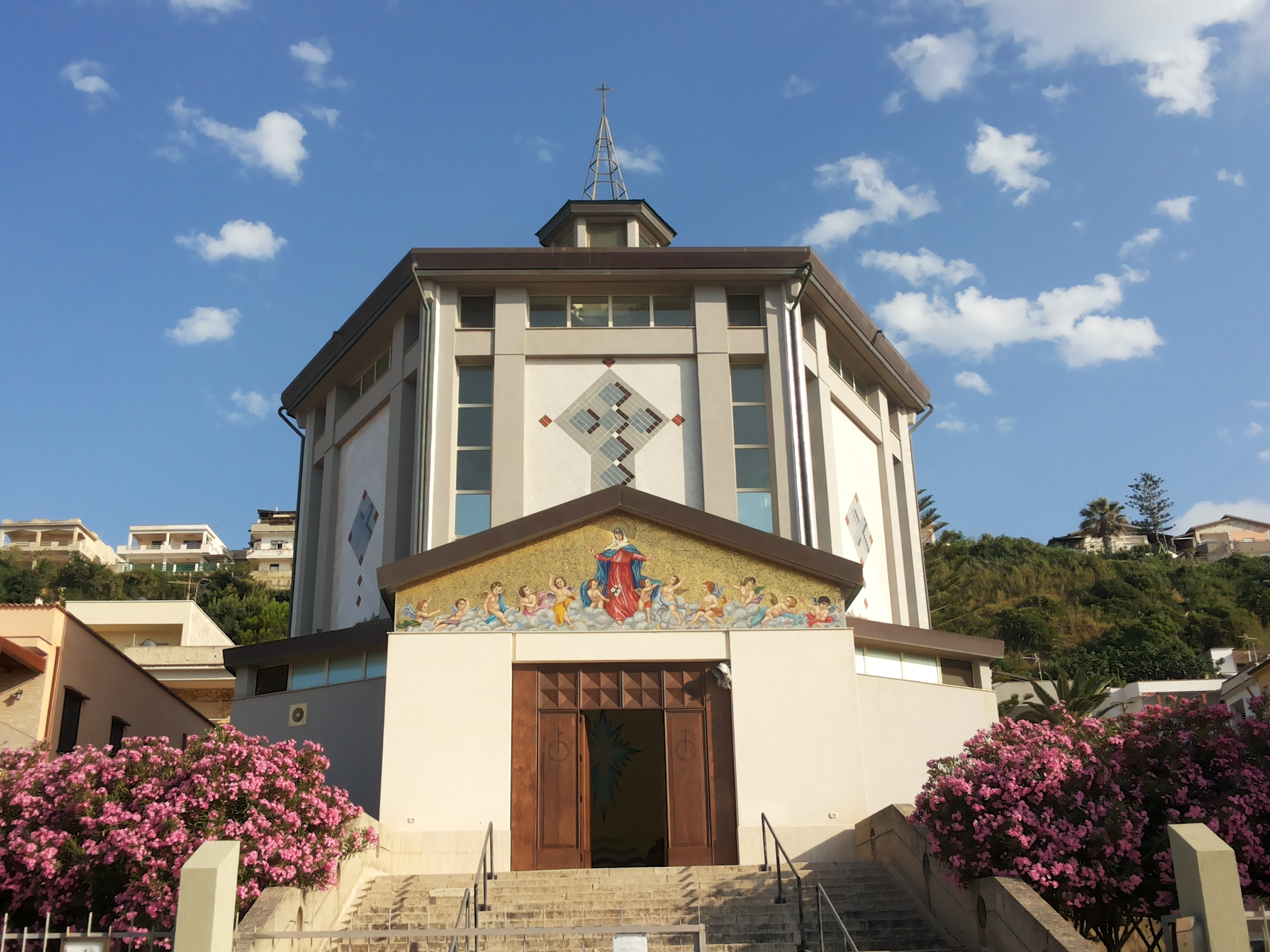
- The façade

Religion
- Affiliation: Catholic
- Province: Palermo
- Region: Sicily
- Rite: Roman Rite
- Ecclesiastical or organisational status: Parish church in the diocese of Trapani
- Leadership: Parish priest: Angelo Grasso
- Patron: Stella Maris – Our Lady, Star of the Sea
- Status: Active

Location
- Location: Alcamo Marina in the province of Trapani
- Municipality: Alcamo
- State: Italy
- Interactive map of Santa Maria della Stella
- Coordinates: 38°01′34″N 12°55′51″E

Architecture
- Style: Modern
- Groundbreaking: 1965

Santa Maria della Stella, in full: Chiesa di Maria Santissima della Stella, lit. 'church of most holy Mary of the star', is a Catholic parish church in Alcamo Marina, northwestern Sicily. It is dedicated to, and sometimes known as, Stella Maris (Our Lady, Star of the Sea; in Italian: Nostra Signora, Stella del Mare). It was built in 1965 and renovated in 2007. Located in a seaside resort that forms part of the commune of Alcamo, it is particularly attended in the summer months. It is in the province of Trapani and is reached by the trunk road Strada Statale 187.

== History ==
Finance for the church's establishment was provided by the Pontificia Commissione centrale per l'arte sacra in Italia ('Pontifical Commission for Sacred Art in Italy') and the Ministry of Public Works. An existing small church, Santa Maria Assunta, could no longer accommodate the growing number of parishioners, especially when the resort's population surged in the summer. Construction began in 1965. It is within the diocese of Trapani and is entrusted to the Salesian fathers. The church and parish buildings were renovated in 2007.

== Description ==
The church is located in the centre of Alcamo Marina. Its main central section has a circular floorplan. Between 2005 and 2007, extensive restoration work on the church and parish complex was undertaken. The planners were the engineers Michelangelo Mangiapane and Giuseppe Di Natale; the interior works were designed by architect Vincenzo Settipani. Restoration of the church exterior, including its façade, was required as proximity to the sea had caused substantial deterioration in the fabric of the building. The restored façade has a trifold entrance which is surmounted by a mosaic representing Stella Maris, Our Lady, Star of the Sea, shown amidst angels.

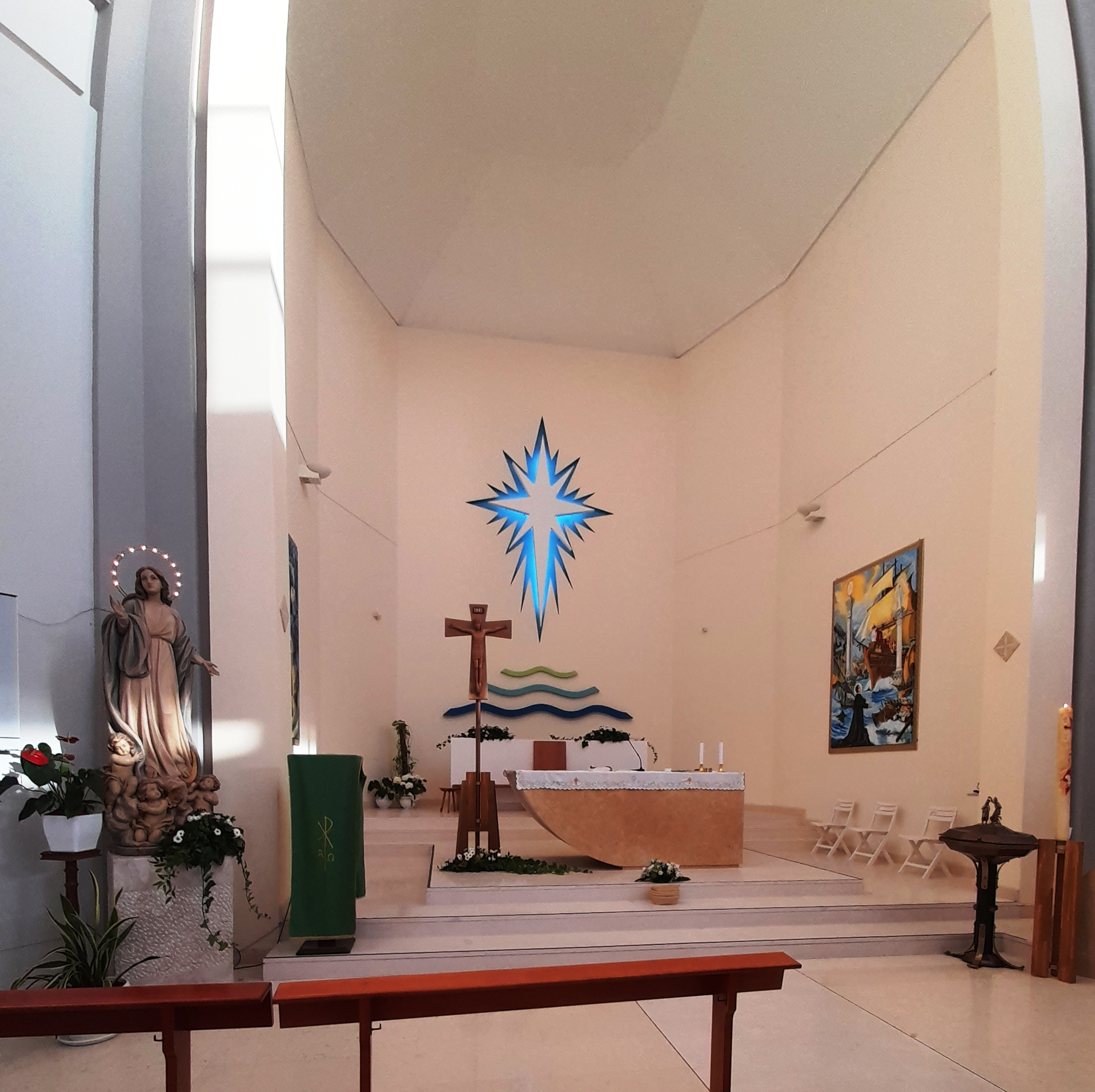
Sanctuary of Stella Maris, Alcamo Marina, 2014

Elements representing the sea were incorporated into the new sanctuary. A blue and white eight-pointed star, a stella maris symbol, with wave emblems beneath, form the reredos, or altarpiece, at the back of the sanctuary. A marble altar, with a boat-like shape, was installed, at its prow, a bronze cross. A non-traditional piece, this bronze artwork bore a minimal, ribbon-like form as an abstracted representation of the Christ figure. Parishioners had raised the funds for the artwork; it was removed in around 2013 and replaced with a wooden crucifix.

Internal and external paving was done in granite, incorporating a star in black granite and yellow Australian granite; pink granite and white marble elements on either side accent the central star. New facilities were the sacristy, the parish office, and additional public toilet facilities. Upgrades included improved accessibility. Electrical systems were modernised and, as the building is most heavily used in summer, air conditioning was included in the refurbishment.
