= Filarete of Calabria =

Italian saint

Saint Filarete of Calabria
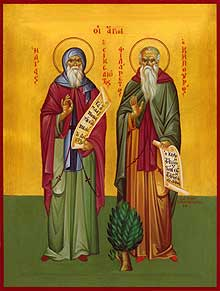
- Ss. Filarete and Elias
- Born: Palermo
- Died: Palmi
- Venerated in: Catholicism, Eastern Orthodoxy, Oriental Orthodoxy
- Feast: 8 April

Filarete of Calabria (also the gardener) (c. 1020 – 1070) he was born in Palermo in 1020, into a family of Calabrian origin deported to Sicily by the Saracens, and subsequently released. Back in Calabria in 1040, Filarete lived in Reggio Calabria and then moved to the monastery of St. Elias stood on Mount Aulinas at Palmi. Later also lived in Sinopoli and then return to Monte Aulinas under the guidance of Orestes, where he spent the last 25 years of his life.
