= Varia di Palmi =

Coordinates: 38°22′N 15°51′E

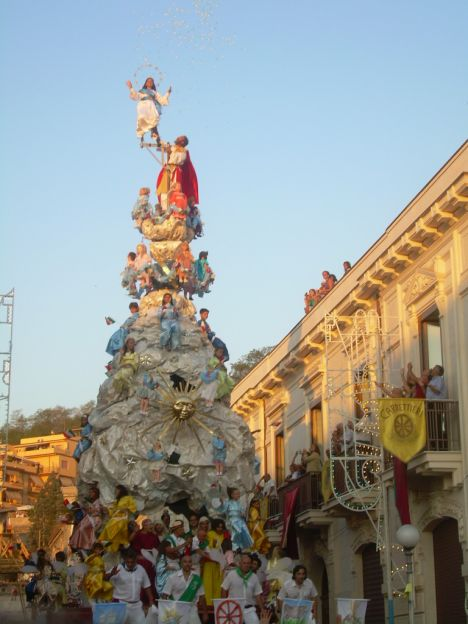
- Transporting the "Varia di Palmi" (2008)
- Genre: Festival
- Date: Last Sunday of August
- Frequency: Annual
- Locations: Palmi, Italy
- Inaugurated: 1582

Celebrations of big shoulder-borne processional structures
- UNESCO Intangible Cultural Heritage
- Country: Italy
- Reference: 00721
- Region: Europe and North America

Inscription history
- Inscription: 2013 (8th session)
- List: Representative

The Varia di Palmi is a Catholic festival that takes place on the last Sunday of August, in Palmi, Italy, in honor of the city's patron saint and protector, the Virgin Mary, known as Our Lady of the Sacred Letter. The event is the most important festival in the Calabria region.

The Varia is a huge holy wagon that represents the Universe and the Assumption of the Virgin Mary. Above the sacred chariot, 200 "mbuttaturi" (carriers) carry 16 metres (52 ft) tall human figures: "Animella" (child representing the Virgin Mary) and human figures representing "Padreterno" God, the apostles, and angels. The entire structure weighs 20 tonnes (20 long tons; 22 short tons).

The event includes a procession the day before, displaying the painting of "Our Lady of the Sacred Letter" and the shrine of the "sacred hair".

The event is part of a network of "Celebrations of big shoulder-borne processional structures", inserted in 2013 in the list of UNESCO Masterpieces of the Oral and Intangible Heritage of Humanity. In addition, the Istituto Centrale per la Demoetnoantropologia ("Central Institute of Demoethnoanthropology") in Rome cataloged the event as "intangible heritage" of the regions of Italy and Rome. Palmi organizes the festival under the patronage of the Province of Reggio Calabria, Calabria and religious institutions.

The origins of the festival date back to 1582, when the Senate of Messina gave a hair of the Virgin Mary to the town of Palmi, in gratitude for the aid provided to the Sicilian town during a plague. As a result of this gift, Palmi Messina imported the tradition of celebrating the Assumption of Mary with a votive chariot that represents the event.

Since 1900, the Varia has had several awards, including the cover of an issue of La Domenica del Corriere, a postage stamp produced by Istituto Poligrafico e Zecca dello Stato and combined with a national lottery.

The event has been the subject of documentaries and profiles broadcast on Rai 3 (2009) and Rete 4 (2006), as well as live broadcasts on local stations and satellite.

== Photo gallery ==
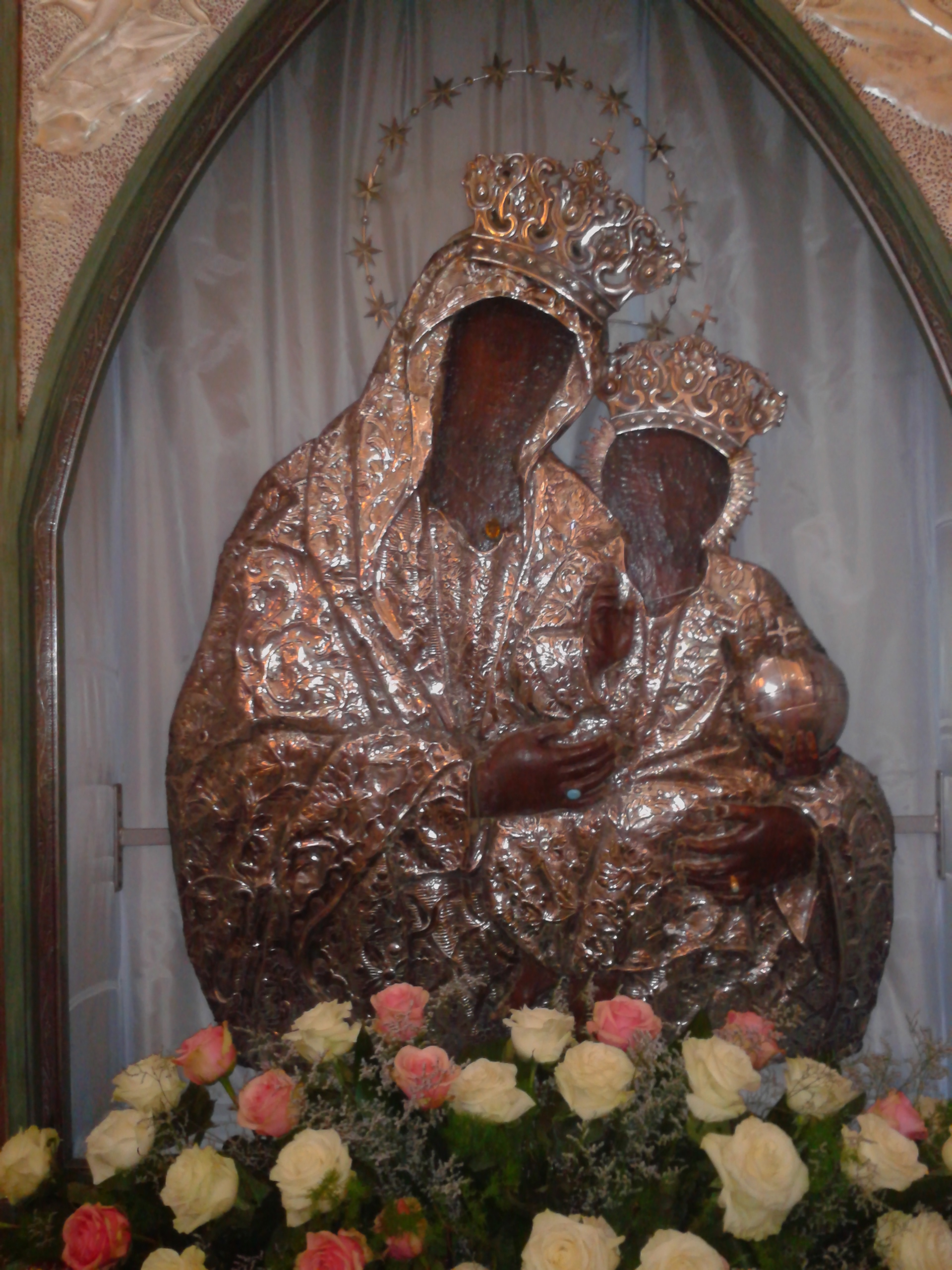
The icon of Our Lady of the Sacred Letter

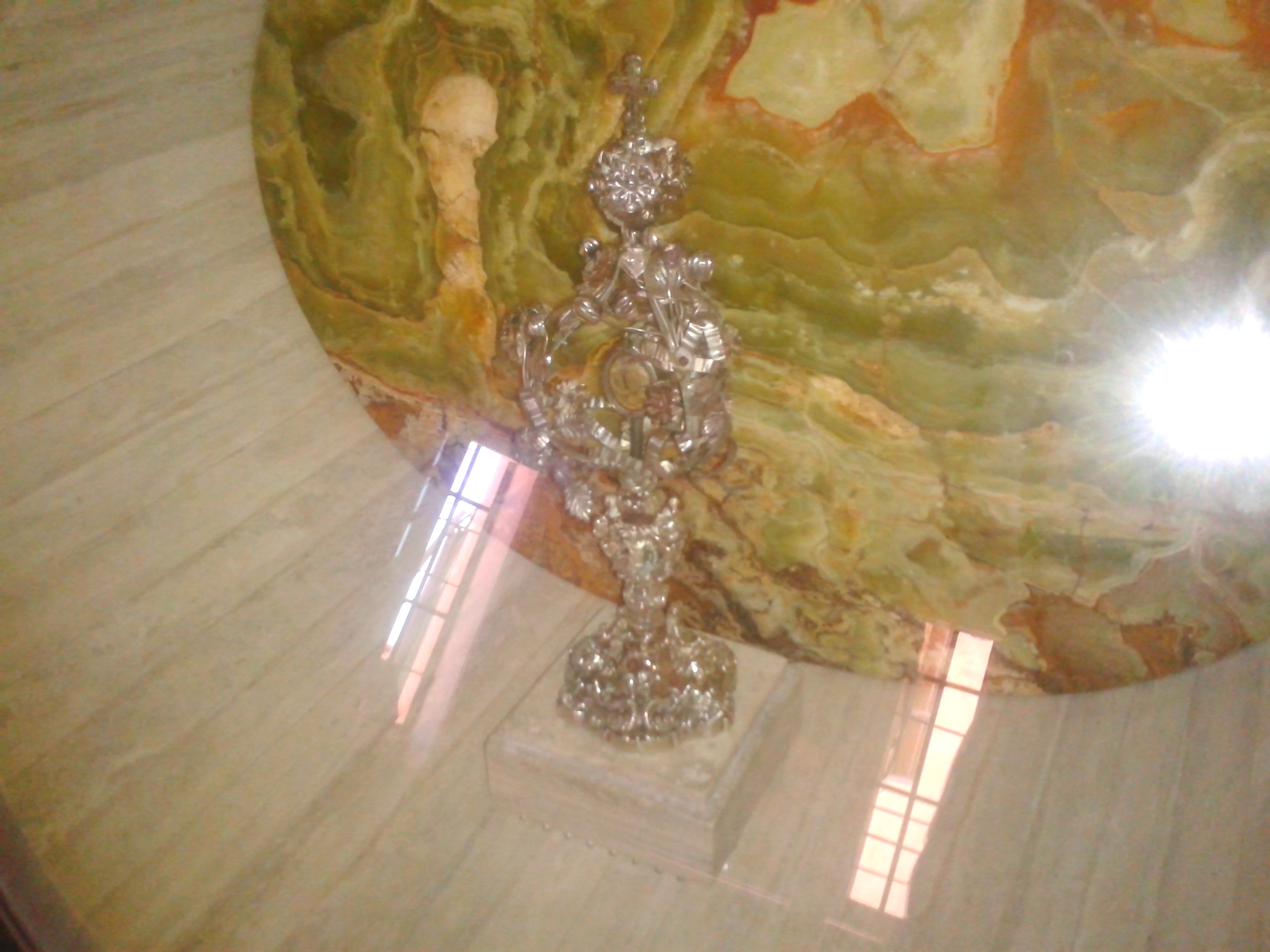
The Shrine of the Sacred hair

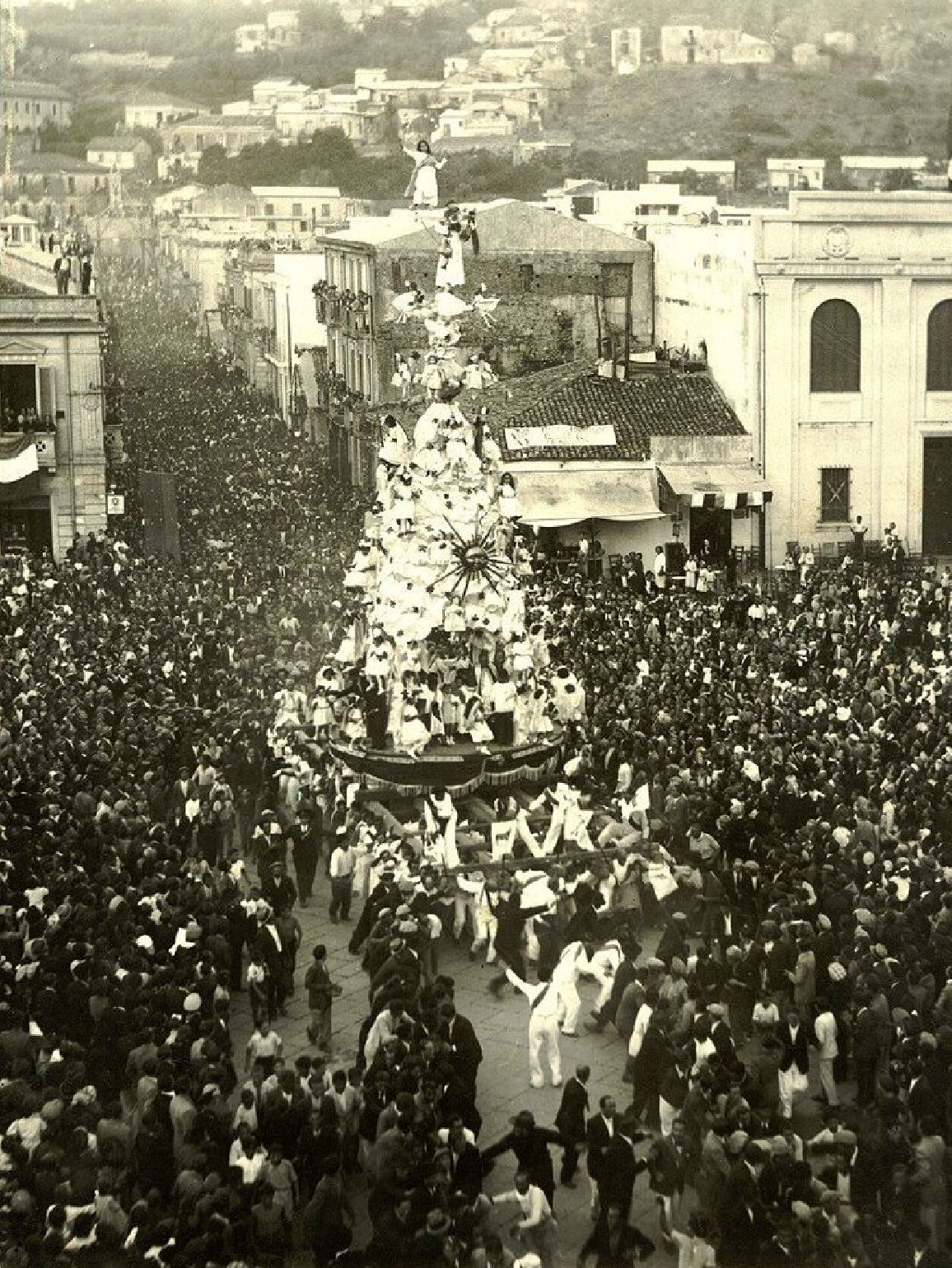
The Varia di Palmi 1938

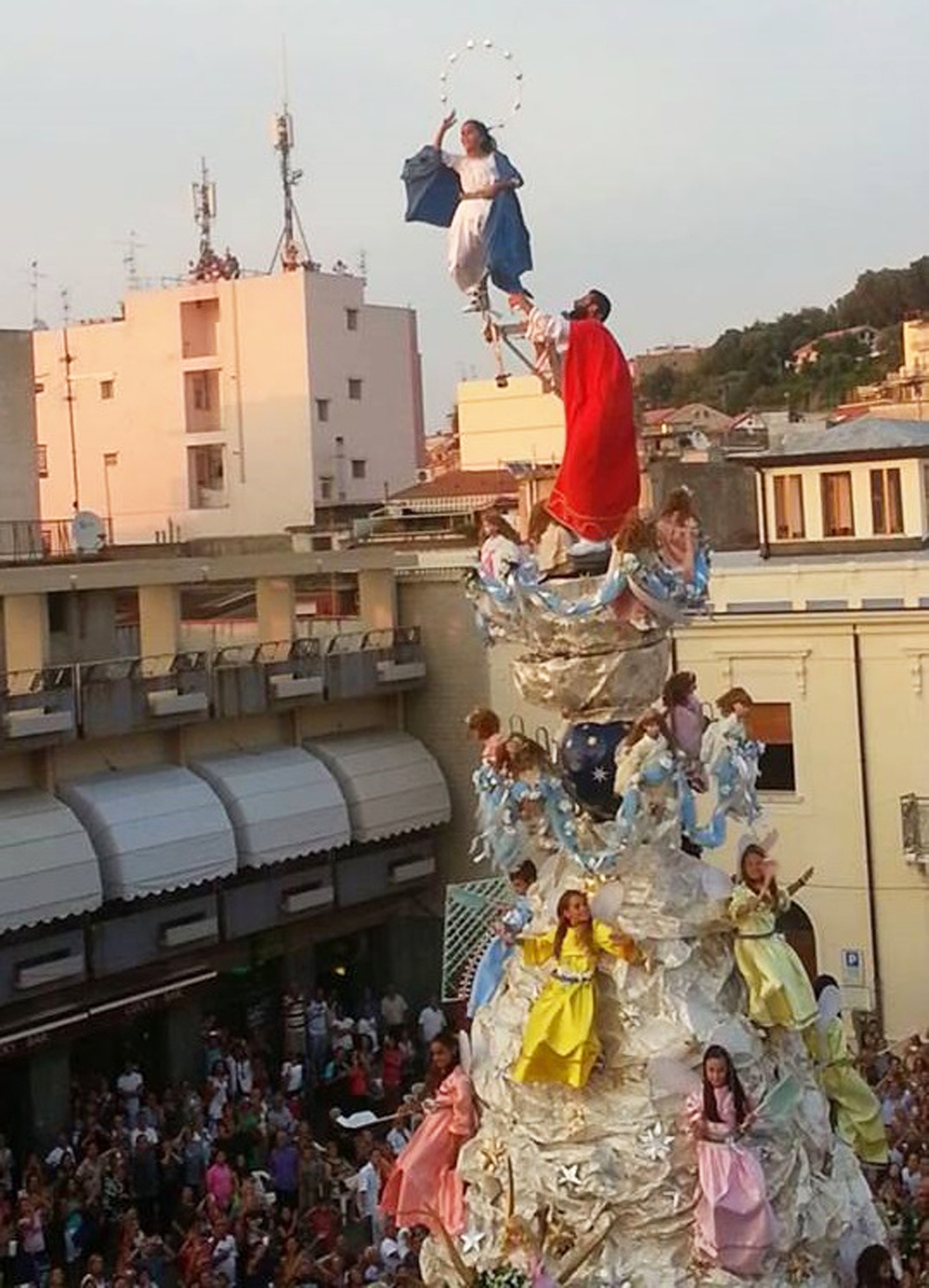
The Varia di Palmi 2013

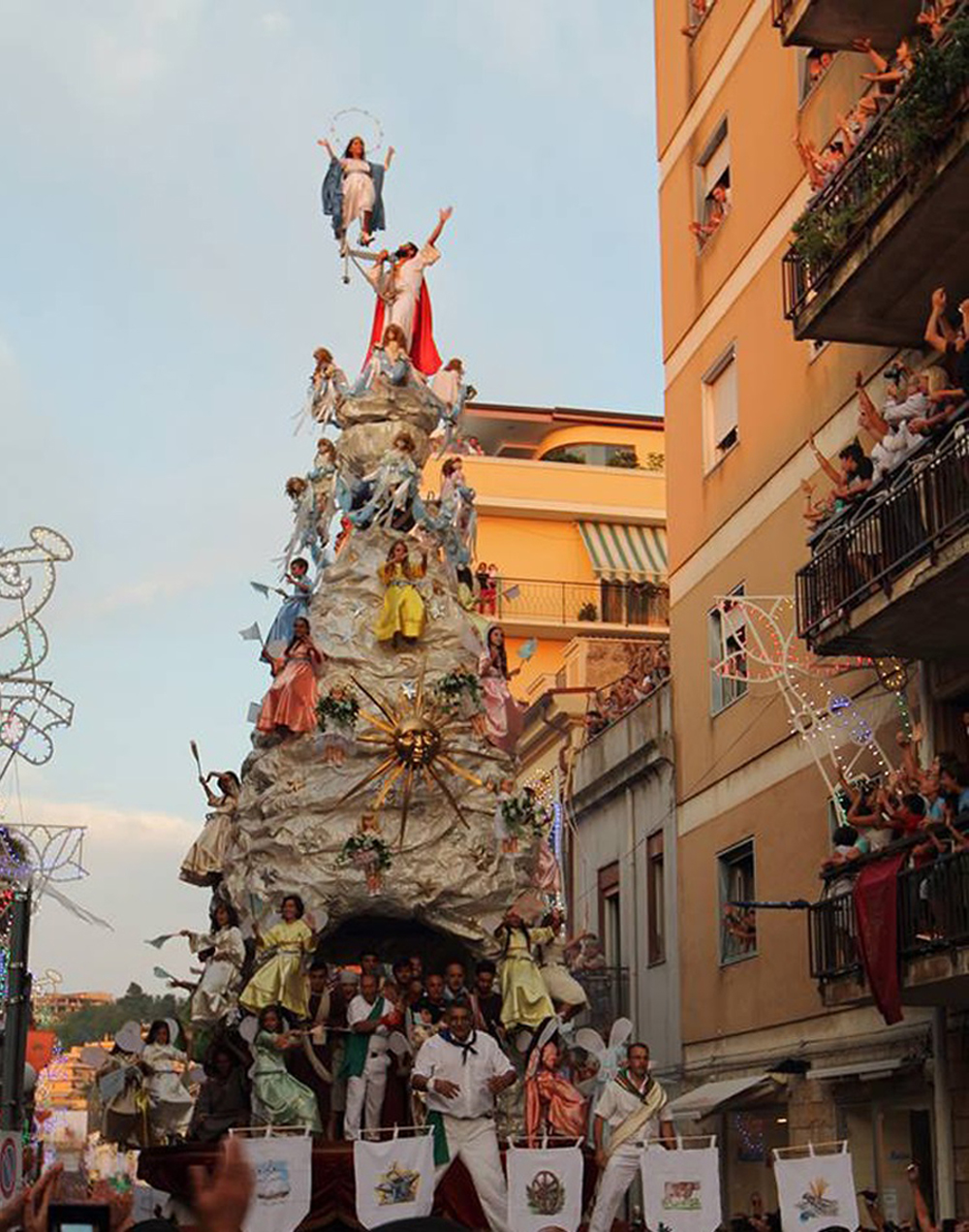
The Varia di Palmi 2013

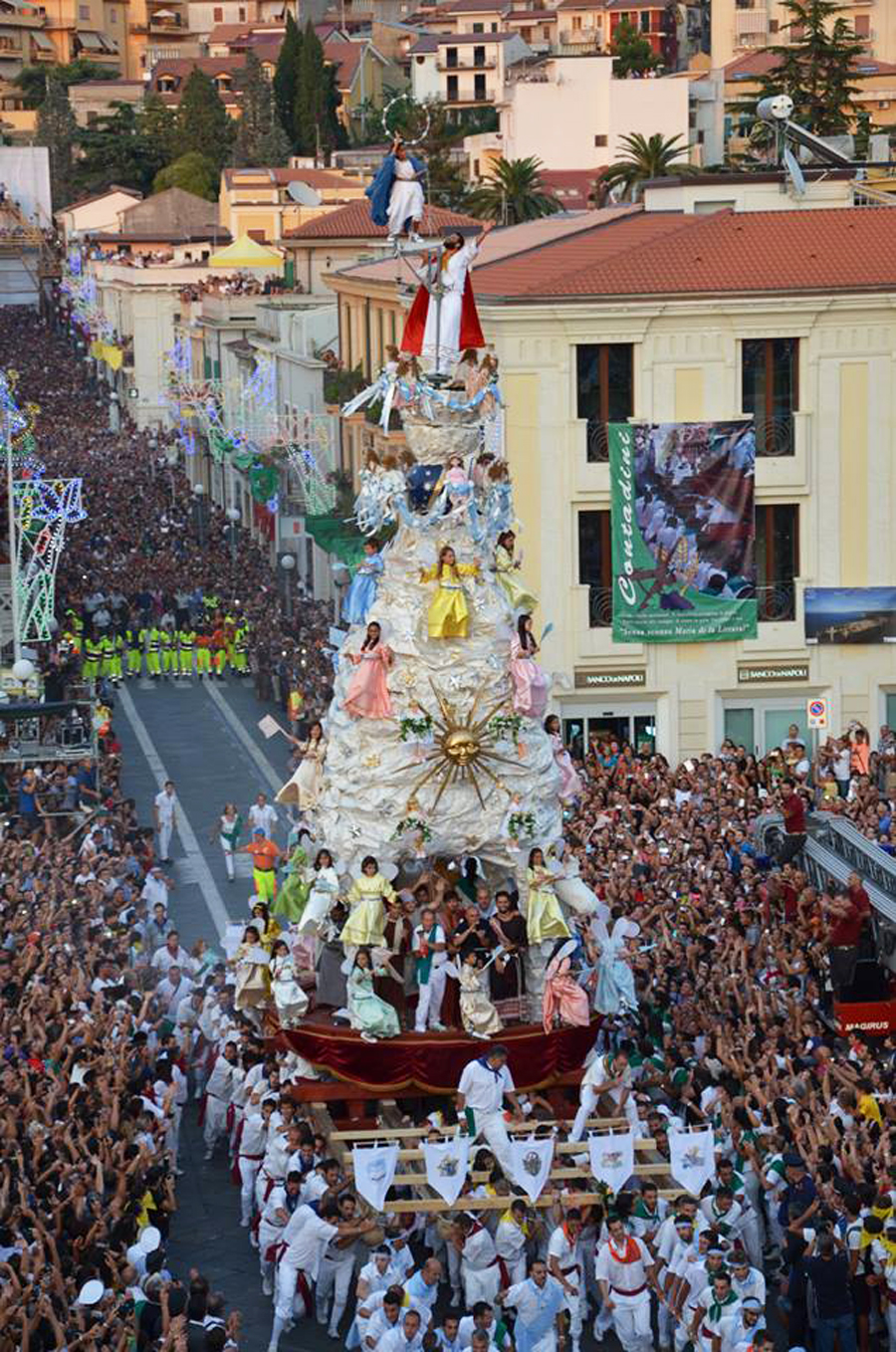
The Varia di Palmi 2013

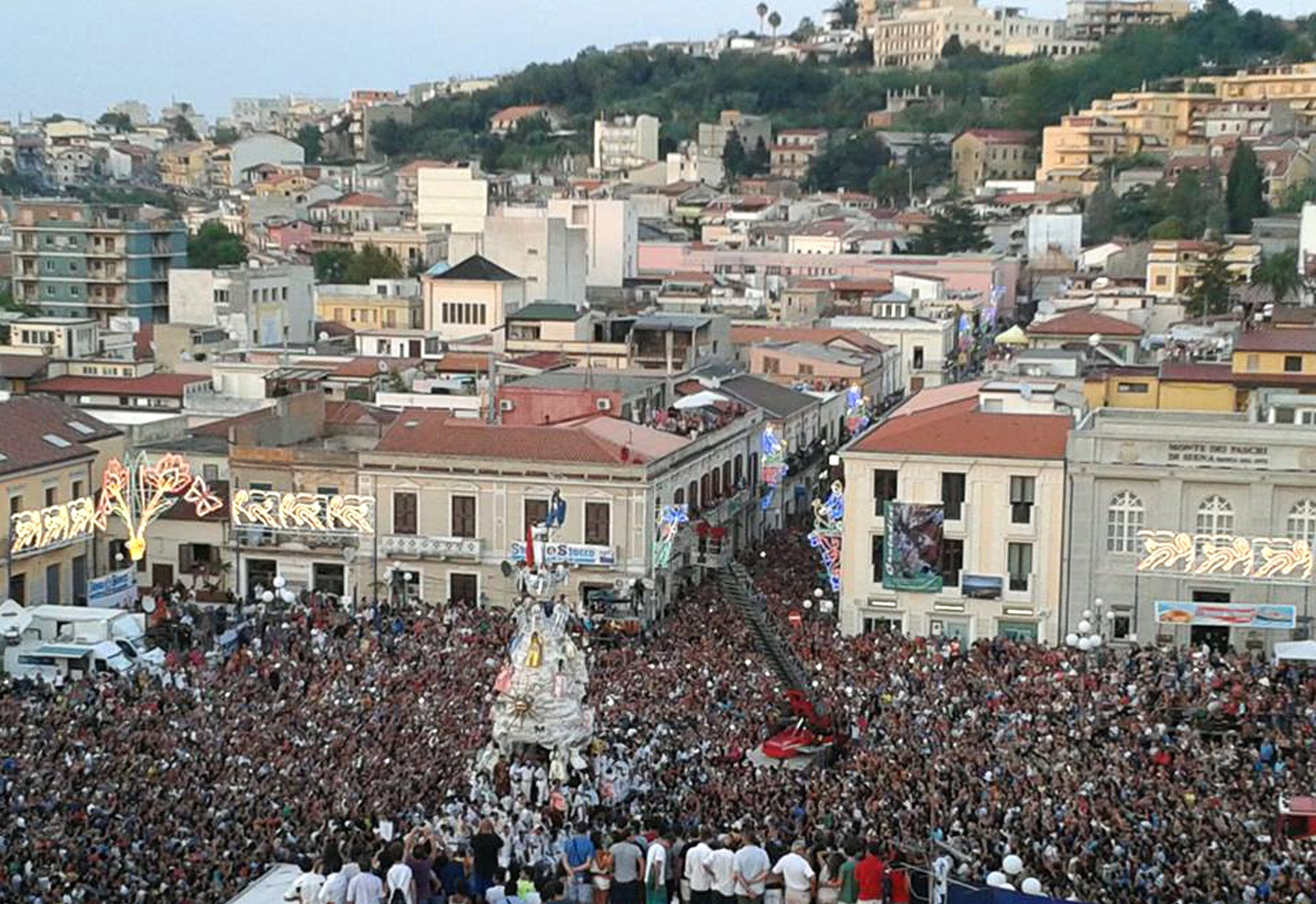
The Varia Palmi 2013 arrival in the square

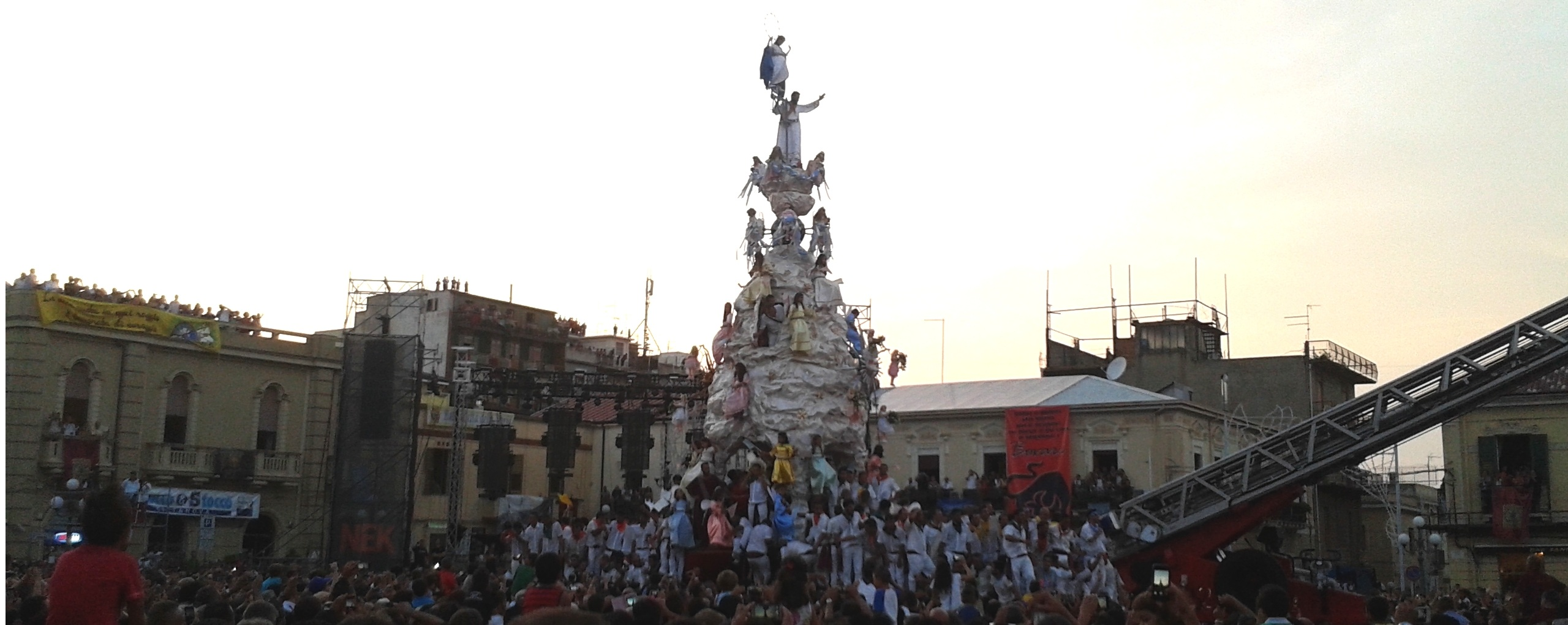
The Varia Palmi 2013 arrival in the square
