= Elias of Enna =

Italian saint (822/823–903)

Saint Elias of Enna
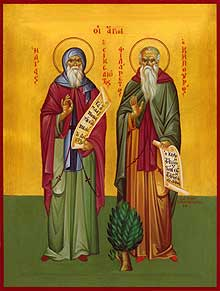
- SS. Elias and Filarete
- Born: Enna
- Died: Thessalonica
- Venerated in: Catholicism, Eastern Orthodoxy, Oriental Orthodoxy

Saint Elias of Enna, born John Rachites (Ancient Greek: Ἰωάννης Ῥαχίτης; 822/823 in Enna – August 17, 903 in Thessalonica), is venerated as a saint by the Catholic Church and the Orthodox Church. Elias is also known as Saint Elias the Younger, or Junior, to distinguish him from the biblical prophet Elijah. He lived a very adventurous life during the ninth century and was the protagonist of repeated exploits. He is commemorated on August 17.

== Biography ==
Because of the Muslim conquest of Sicily, John was forced to abandon the town, which was conquered by the Saracens in 859 despite its strength as a military stronghold. The Arabs still managed to imprison Elias, who was taken to Ifriqiya to be sold as a slave. After managing to regain his freedom, Elias decided to preach the Gospel, several times risking his own life, and arrived in Palestine, where he received the monastic habit from the Patriarch of Jerusalem. After three years in a monastery of Sinai, Brother Elias undertook an adventurous series of travels, going first to Alexandria in Egypt, and then Persia, Antioch and again to Africa. After 878 Syracuse also fell into Muslim hands. Elias then returned to the island, where he met his elderly mother in Palermo. At Taormina he met Daniel, a new disciple of his. Going north, Elias lived in Calabria, where in the year 884, in the Valley of Salt, and more precisely on Mount Aulinas (now Mount Saint Elias near Palmi), he founded a monastery later named after him. Subsequent Arab invasions forced Elias to repair to Patras in Greece, and then to Santa Caterina in Aspromonte.

Elias then went on a pilgrimage to Rome. The adventures, the wonders and the evangelization that Elias had undertaken on three continents extended his fame to Constantinople, where the Byzantine Emperor Leo VI the Wise invited him to visit. Elias, however, now seventy, though he began the journey to Constantinople, fell ill and died at Thessaloniki. His most faithful friend and companion, the monk Daniel, buried him in the monastery of Monte Aulinas, at Palmi, founded by the saint.

An edition of the Greek text of the saint's life and an Italian translation was published by Giuseppe Rossi Taibbi.

== Places of worship dedicated to the saint ==
In Italy the following churches are dedicated to him:

- Church of Saint Elias of Palmi
- Orthodox Monastery of Saints Elias and Filaret of Seminara
- Church of Saint Elias of Reggio Calabria
- Statue of St Elias (1818) Triq Santa Tereza, Cospicua

== Bibliography ==
- Rossi Taibbi, Giuseppe (1982). Vita di Sant'Elia il Giovane. Palermo: Istituto siciliano di studi bizantini e neoellenici.
- A. Basile, The New Monastery of St. Elias and St. Philaret at Seminara in ASCL XIV, 1945, n. 2;
- N. Ferrante, The Monastery of St. Elianovo and Philaretos Seminara in Historica XXXII (1979);
- Anonymous (Monaco), Life and Works Of Our Holy Father Elijah Young (Siculus) (ed. editorial and translation into modern Greek Monaco Hagiorite Cosma, Stefano Italian translation of the Island), Joseph Pontari Editore, Rome
