= Golem Volley =

Italian women's volleyball club

Golem Software Palmi
- Full name: Golem Volley
- Ground: PalaSurace, Palmi, Italy (Capacity: 600)
- Chairman: Massimo Salvago
- Head coach: Pasqualino Giangrossi
- 2016–17: 10th (in Serie A2)
- Website: Club home page

Uniforms
Home	Away

Golem Volley is an Italian women's volleyball club based in Palmi and last played in the Serie A2 in 2016–17.

== Previous names ==
Due to sponsorship, the club have competed under the following names:

- Golem Volley (....–2015)
- Golem Software Palmi (2015–present)

== History ==
The club has played in the lower national leagues and was promoted to Serie A2 in 2015. After two seasons at Serie A2, the club did not submit a request to participate in the 2017–18 season.

== Venue ==
The club play its home matches at PalaSurace (also known as Palazzetto dello Sport “Mimmo Surace”) in Palmi. The venue has a 600 spectators capacity.

== Team ==
The club last Serie A2 squad, season 2016–2017, as of March 2017.

Number	Player	Position	Height (m)	Weight (kg)	Birth date
1	(Brazil) Tifanny Abreu	Outside hitter	1.94		29 October 1984 (age 41)
3	(Italy) Monica Lestini	Outside hitter	1.83		13 January 1994 (age 32)
6	(Italy) Giovanna Tomaselli	Outside hitter	1.90		17 July 1992 (age 33)
7	(Italy) Elisa Zanette	Outside hitter	1.93	86	17 February 1996 (age 30)
8	(Italy) Geraldina Quiligotti	Libero	1.67		16 October 1994 (age 31)
10	(Italy) Alice Barbagallo	Libero	1.70		24 April 1997 (age 29)
11	(Italy) Erica Vietti	Setter	1.87	66	11 November 1992 (age 33)
12	(Croatia) Bruna Ana Vranković	Outside hitter	1.87		26 July 1998 (age 27)
13	(Italy) Ludovica Guidi	Middle blocker	1.85		17 December 1992 (age 33)
14	(Italy) Ilaria Angelelli	Setter	1.72		17 June 1986 (age 39)
16	(Italy) Tiziana Veglia	Middle blocker	1.86		13 September 1992 (age 33)
18	(Italy) Francesca Moretti	Outside hitter	1.78		5 February 1985 (age 41)
	(Italy) Valeria Caracuta	Setter	1.73	61	14 December 1987 (age 38)
	(Italy) Luisa Casillo	Middle blocker	1.88		8 July 1988 (age 37)
