= Francesco Rèpaci =

Italian lawyer and politician

Francesco Rèpaci (Palmi, 1880– Torino, 1955) was an Italian lawyer and politician. He was a socialist and antifascist.

He was a friend of Gabriele D'Annunzio, the father of Antonino Rèpaci, and the grandfather of Gabriella Rèpaci-Courtois.

== Biography ==
The son of a bricklayer, Francesco Rèpaci completed legal studies in Naples and Rome and then took up the profession of lawyer in Turin.

A staunch socialist, he joined the Italian Socialist Union, a reformist grouping created by Leonida Bissolati. When the latter was expelled from the Italian Socialist Party in 1912, he became close to Benito Mussolini. At the outbreak of World War I he sided with the interventionist front and left for the front as a volunteer. There he contracted an illness that would paralyze him, condemning him to lifelong immobility.

After breaking relations with Mussolini, he reconnected with the Italian Socialist Party in the early postwar period.

He witnessed a murder against a fascist in Palmi, Calabria, and was accused of complicity in the assassination. He was forced to spend six months as a fugitive in the Calabrian mountains before being found innocent.

In 1922, on the occasion of the Fascist massacre carried out by Piero Brandimarte in Turin, he took the civil side on behalf of the victims. On that occasion he wrote a series of very harsh articles of protest in L'Avanti! and Il Grido del Popolo di Torino under the pseudonym Giacomo Bonomo.

An Anti-fascism, Francesco Rèpaci continued as a Lawyer during the dictatorship. Married to Clielia Allegri, he had two children, Antonino and Maria. His son Antonino Repaci would become a magistrate and historian of Fascism.
