= Tauriana =

Ancient Brutti city in Calabria

- Ταυρανία (Greek)
- Taureana, Taurianum
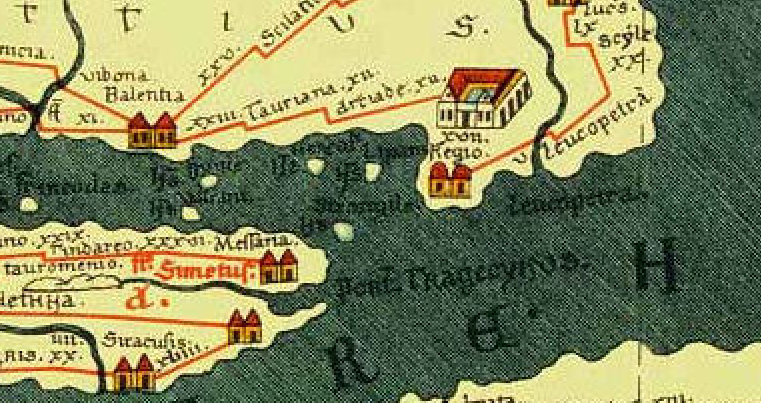

- Location within Italy
- 38°22′N 15°51′E
- Type: Settlement
- Location: Palmi, Province of Reggio Calabria, Calabria, Italy
- Region: Bruttium

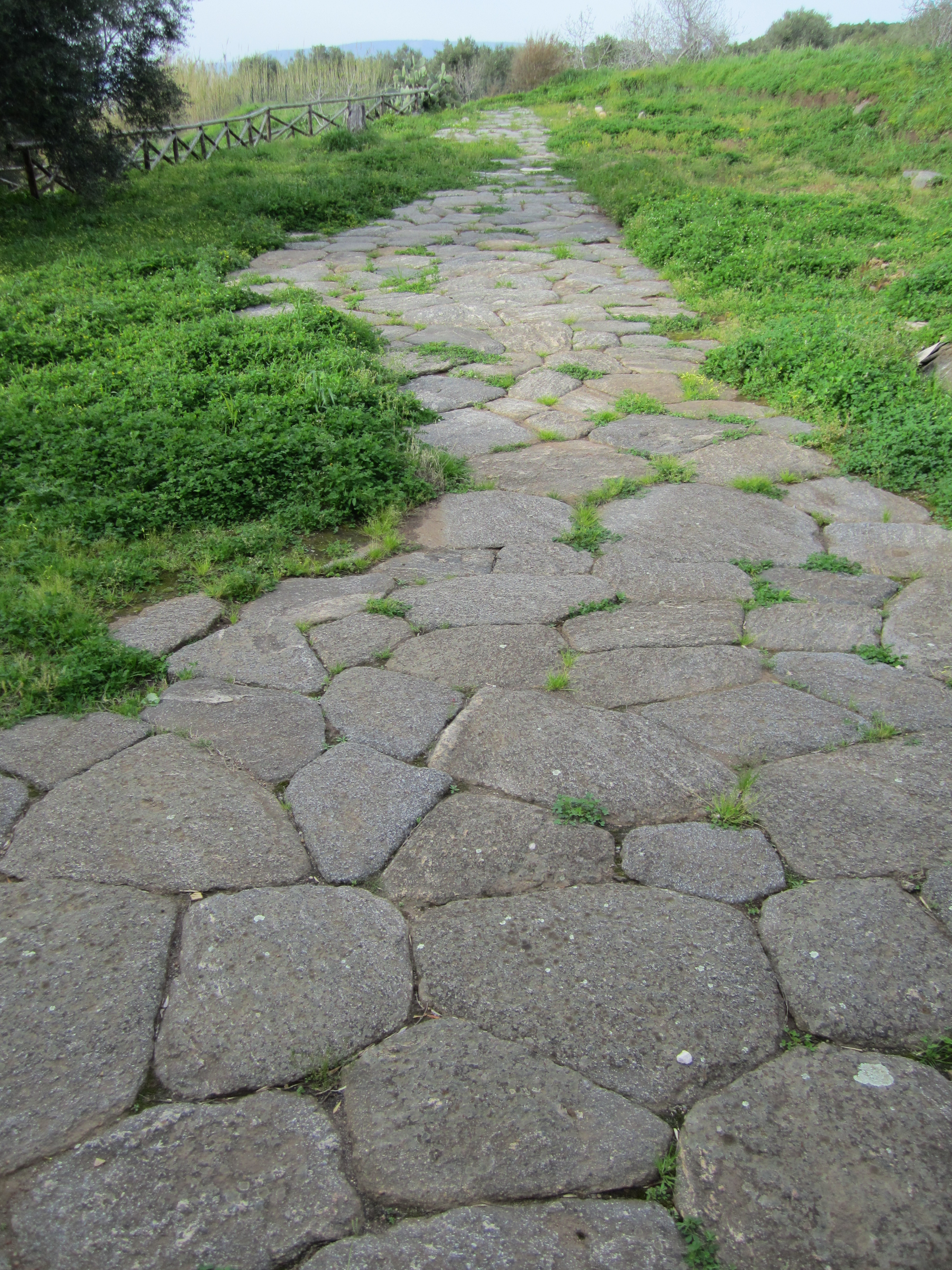
Roman street

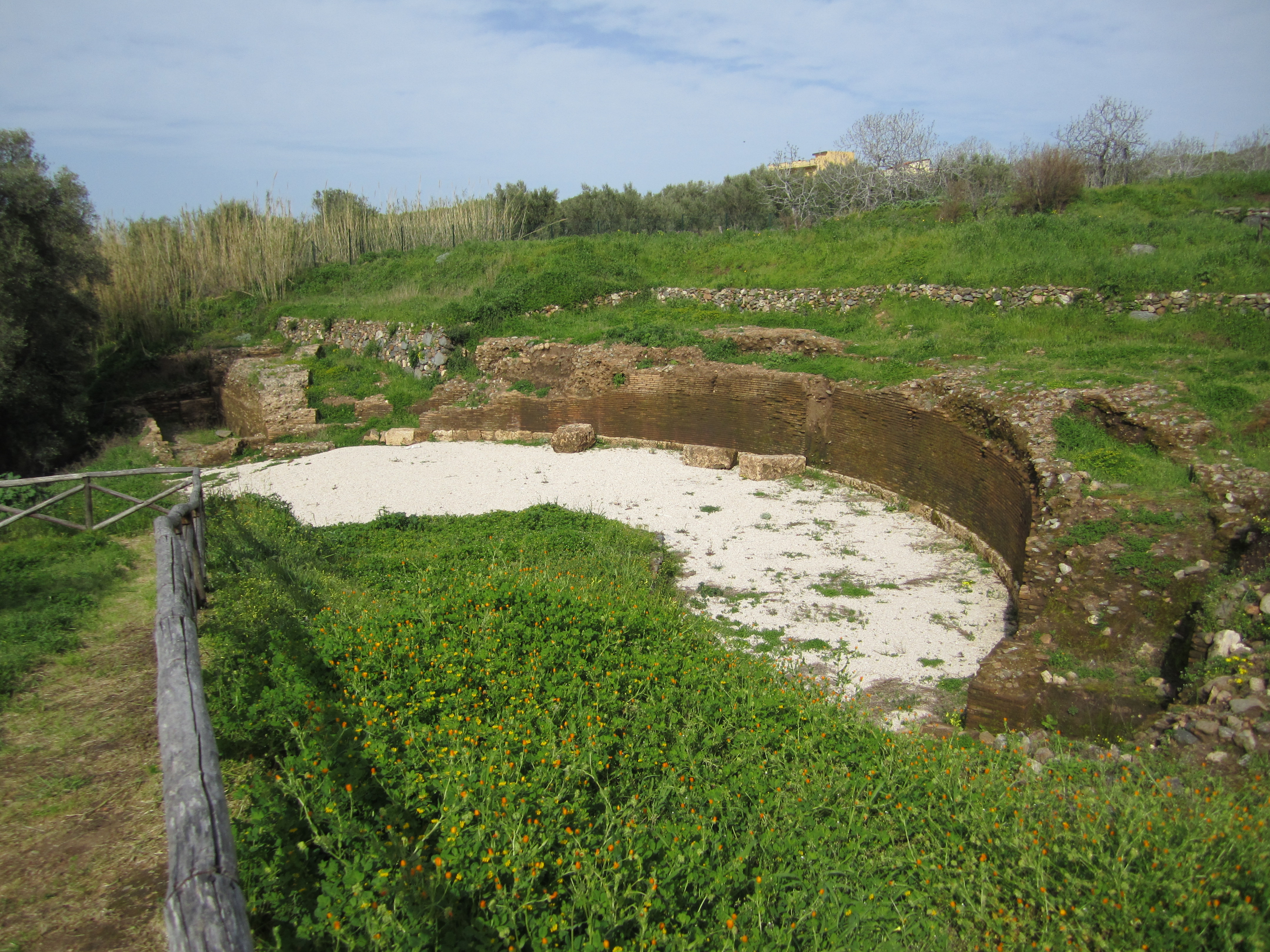
Amphitheatre

Tauriana or Taureana (Taurianum in Latin, Ταυρανία in Greek) was an ancient city located in present Palmi, Reggio Calabria province.

The city stood 1 km south of the river Metauros (probably Petrace) on the north-western Tyrrhenian coast and in ancient Greek times marked the border of Rhegion (Reggio Calabria) territory facing that of Locri. Its territory was adjacent to the city of Metauros, founded in the 7th century BC near the mouth of the river of the same name. The river served, among other things, as a division between the two cities.

== History ==
The location of the territory was strategic, almost at the entrance to the Messina Strait which favoured maritime trade routes to the Aeolian archipelago and the north-eastern coast of Sicily, whose artistic-commercial links with this territory since the proto-historic age are documented by obsidian and ceramic finds.

Some legends tell of an original Achaean Greek colonisation of the area.

Other hypotheses link the birth of the city to the second half of the 4th century BC, when groups from Reggio and Locri reached the site conquering nearby cities such as Terina, Hipponion and Petelia. Therefore, in the Hellenistic age there was the conquest of the territory south of the Metauros by the people of Rhegion, specifically the "Taurians", an Italic people.

During the 2nd Punic War (218–201 BC) it had rebelled but subsequently returned to the protection of Rome.

With the Romanisation of the area following the Social Wars, the Bruttian presence in the territory disappeared and the Taurians, owing to good relationship with the Romans, gained political and administrative autonomy over their territory, losing their subordination to the city of Rhegion.

The first settlement was almost completely erased by the subsequent layout in the 2nd century BC when a new city was built on the old walls and with a rectangular street grid delimiting insulae.

Later Byzantine Tauriana was destroyed by the Saracens in the middle of the 10th century.

Most of the archaeological finds today are in the Archaeological Park of Tauriani.

=== Ecclesiastical history ===
From circa 600 (others say the 3rd or 4th century) Taurianum was also the see of a Catholic diocese, in the ecclesiastical province of Reggio Calabria. In its territory was born and lived in Saint Fantino the Elder alias the Wonderworker, the oldest saint of Calabria (not be confused with St. Fantinus the Younger). The crypt where his remains were buried, below the 'Temple' of Santo Fantino, is the oldest Catholic place of worship in the region.

In 1040 it lost territory to establish the Diocese of Oppido Mamertina. In 1093 it was suppressed, its territory being merged into the Diocese of Mileto.

== The site ==
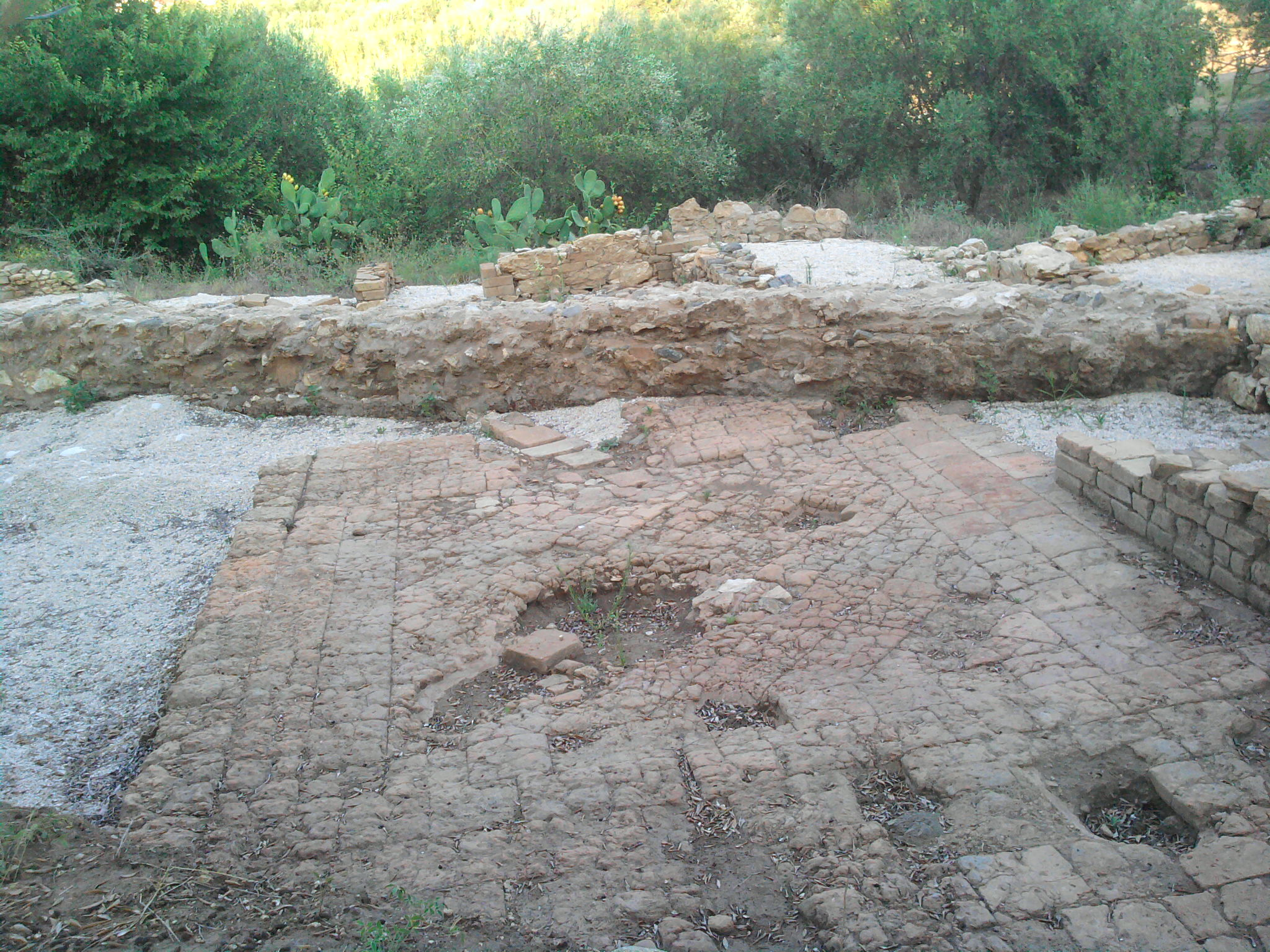
House of the Mosaic

Research conducted since the mid-1990s has exposed a town dating between the second half of the 4th and the 1st century BC with road axes, houses, drainage channels, dolia for foodstuffs.

The buildings discovered include:

- a protohistoric village dating to 2000 BC;
- remains of the city (first Brettian then Roman) including:
  - to the north, public, sacred and private architecture such as the "house of the Mosaic" and an area paved with rhomboidal terracotta slabs and a channel with bricks bearing the ethnic TAURIANOYM
  - the "urban sanctuary", known as the "house of Donna Canfora".
  - a Roman street on the westernmost part of the plateau, 5 m wide and one of the main axes on which residential buildings open to the south
  - an amphitheatre, perhaps built in the 1st century AD and remaining in use until the 4th century, unique in southern Italy both for its small size and architectural particularities, it could have been used simultaneously for games and theatrical performances.

=== The House of the Mosaic ===
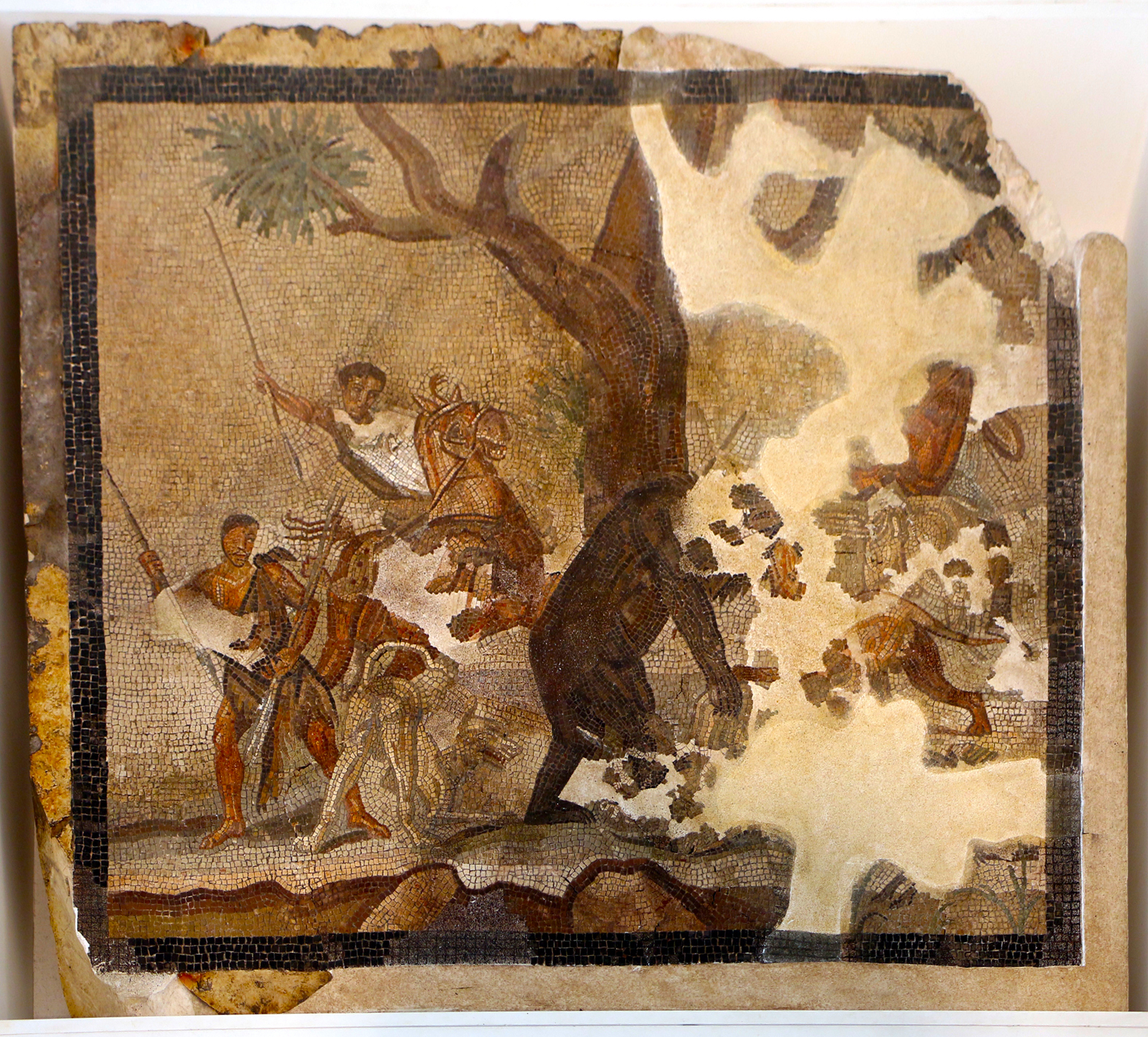
110-50 BC, from house of the mosaic

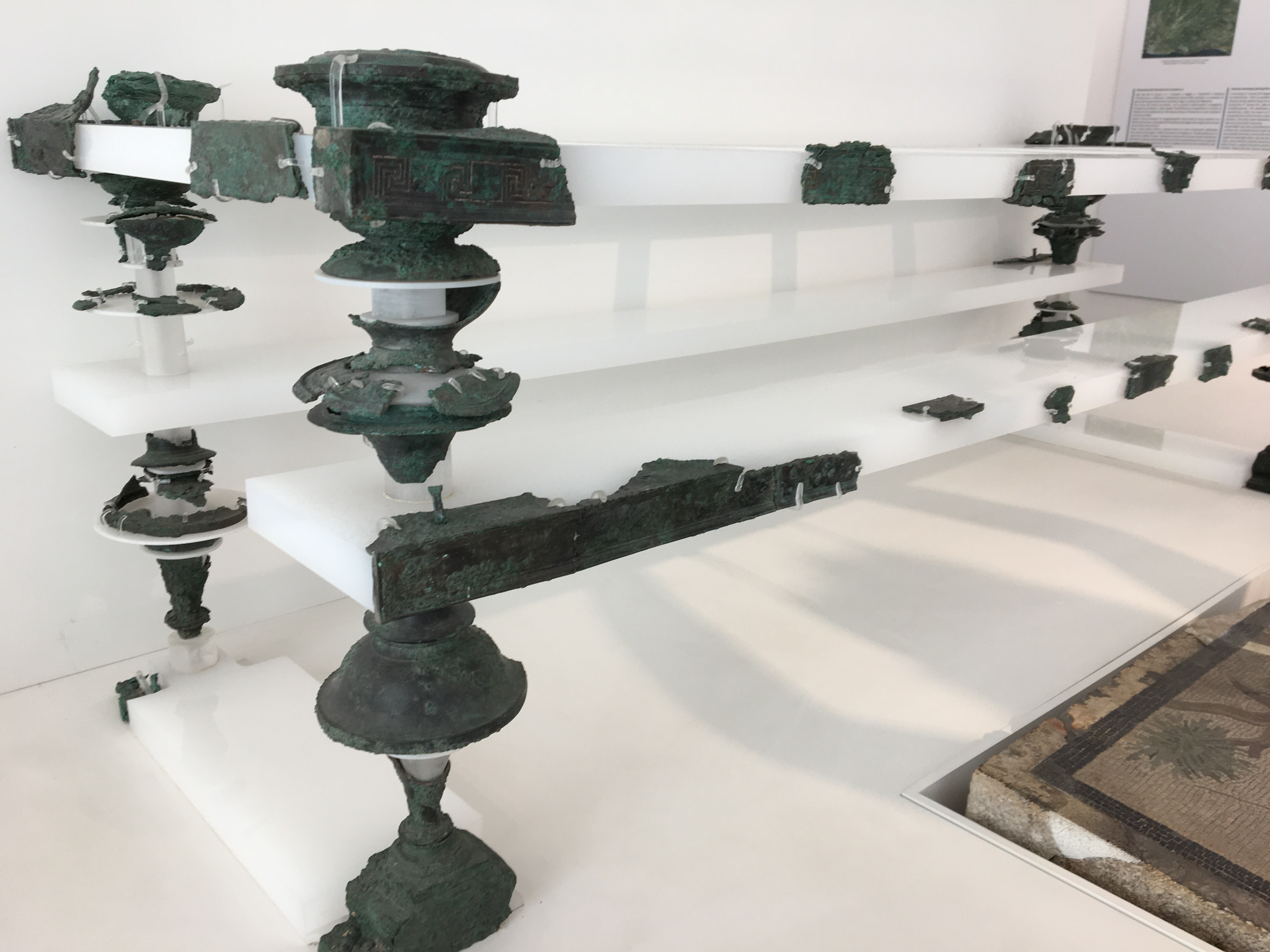
Couch (Kline) from house of the mosaic

The orientation of the house from the 2nd to the 1st century BC is completely out of line with the rest of the town for which there would have been strongly symbolic reason, as the home of a public figure. Further elements set this building, on the edge of the terrace, apart such as large ashlars which gave it an imposing appearance and the wealth of stucco decoration, the painted plaster, the floor mosaics and the particularly fine ornaments. There were at least twenty rooms which gave onto what was probably a portico surrounding a courtyard paved with terracotta tiles.

The banquet hall at the North end had space for seven couches. One of these was made of bronze and decorated with silver ornaments and precious stones. The floor of the hall was probably decorated with a black and white mosaic. At its centre a splendid hunting scene was laid with minute polychrome tesserae depicting a hunting scene with two knights and a spear-bearer on either side of a wounded bear. The scene, dominated by a large tree, is completed by a dog, a feline and a wild boar. The couch is currently on display in the National Archaeological Museum of Reggio Calabria. The house was demolished and the materials reused for the construction of the great sanctuary.

=== Roman sanctuary ===
The construction of this building on the western edge of the Tauriana plateau, unique in the architectural and religious context of ancient Calabria, was particularly significant of the new Roman phase. The choice to erect it in the most visible point of the plateau overlooking the coast was not accidental: the temple, close to the northern edge, almost isolated and emerging from the rest of the residential context, would have been immediately visible to anyone sailing from the north.

The temple typologically fits Etruscan-Italic type podium temples: the high quadrangular podium (approximately 10x20 m) on a 2.25 m foundation was made in opus caementicium. Originally it featured decorations and coverings in local stone, marble and stucco. A brick facing partially covered the elevation, and on a couple of bricks the stamp "(C) Numitori" is still legible, already known in Palmi on bricks found in the past century in the Tauriana area. The access consisted of a staircase, no longer preserved today, and was probably located on the short north side, a portico of which the walls at foundation level are preserved on three sides.

Its construction involved a modification of the previous Brettian settlement as demonstrated, among other things, by the obliteration of the quadrangular canal with the stamps, brought to light a couple of metres west of the temple.
