= Palmi Cathedral =

Building in Palmi, Italy

Coordinates: 38°21′35″N 15°50′56″E

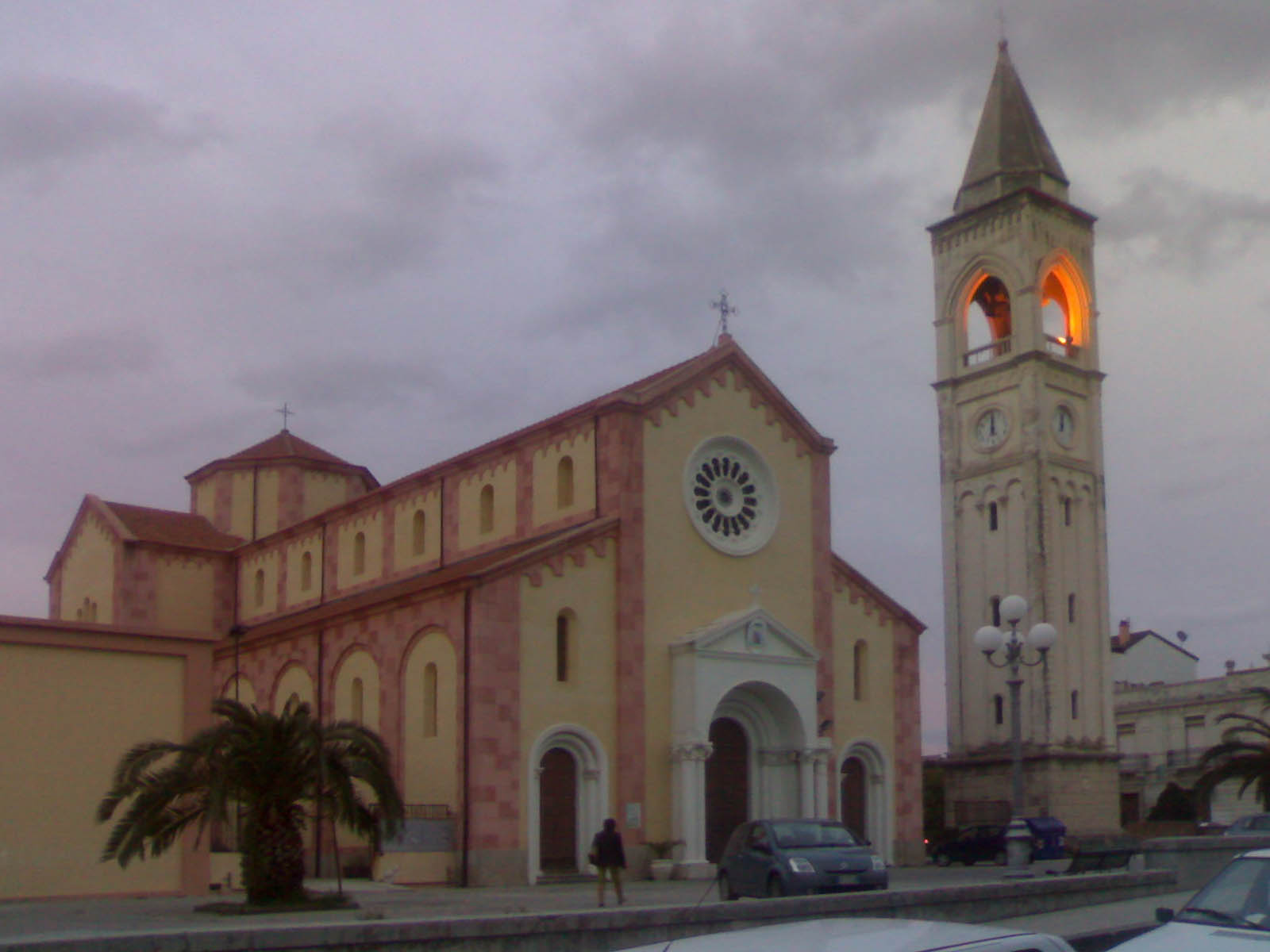
- Region: Calabria

Location
- Country: Italy
- Interactive map of Palmi Cathedral

Architecture
- Type: Cathedral
- Style: Romanesque Revival architecture

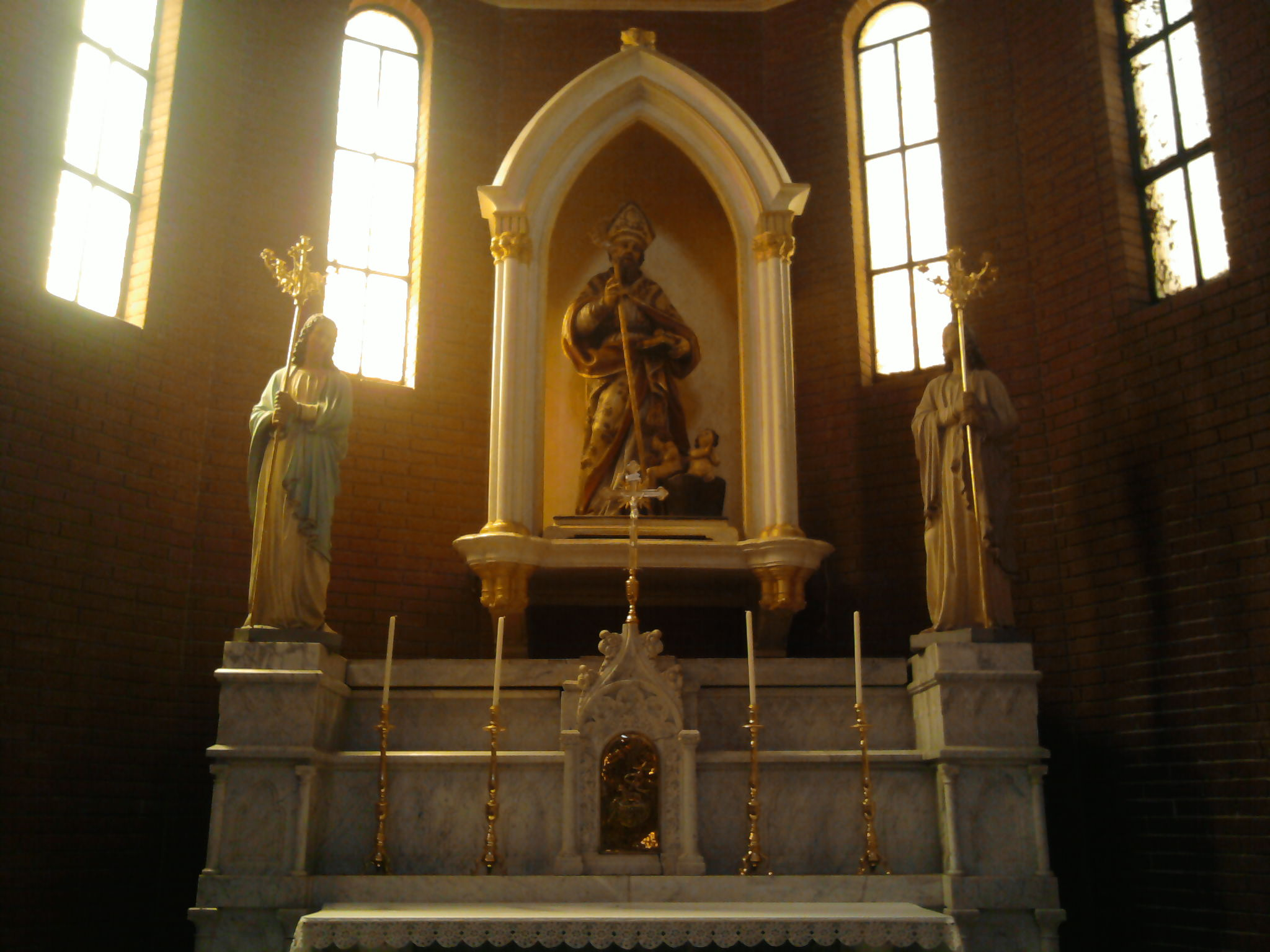
apses of St. Nicholas

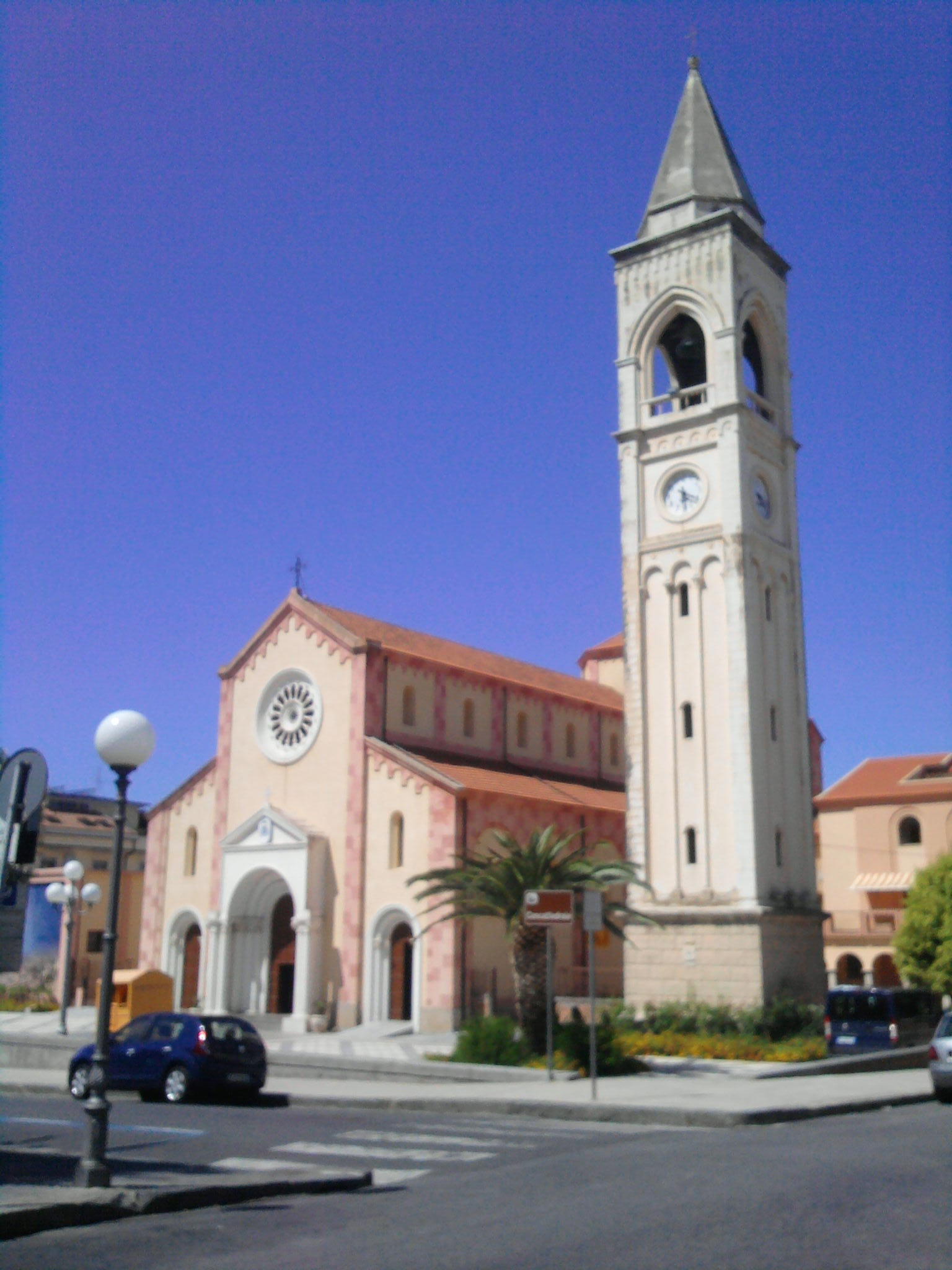
front of the cathedral

Palmi Cathedral or the Church of Saint Nicholas (Italian: Concattedrale di Palmi, Chiesa di San Nicola) is the principal church of Palmi in Italy, and co-cathedral of the diocese of Oppido Mamertina-Palmi.

== History ==
There are no accurate reports on the age in which this parish was established. Between 1310 and 1311, is attested in Palmi a church of St. Nicholas was the only one in the village. The church of St. Nicholas is again reminded in some acts of 1532. The church, in 1586, stood clear of the city walls and inside there was located the "Brotherhood of St. Nicholas." In 1664 was founded instead a "Brotherhood in Purgatory."

In the 18th century, the clergy and the authorities of Palmi strove because the church was elevated to a collegiate church. On 25 August 1741 the Bishop of Miletus Marcello Filomarini, erected 's "illustrious collegiate Palmi", having obtained from Pope Benedict XIII papal bull.

The church, which was rebuilt in the period 1740–1743, was destroyed by the 1783 Calabrian earthquakes. In March 1786 the church was rebuilt.

The church was again damaged by an earthquake in 1894. Then it was provided once again in its reconstruction, but came the 1908 Messina earthquake which caused further serious damage to the structure that prejudiced use. Therefore, in 1909, proceeded to the demolition of the building.

The new and current collegiate church of St. Nicholas, was opened for worship in 1932 and was dedicated to the "Madonna of the Letter", the main protector of the city.

In the main façade, next to the church was completed in 1956 the Civic Tower with clock.

On 10 June 1979, pursuant to Decree "Quo aptius" of the Congregation for Bishops, which redrew the boundaries of the dioceses of Calabria and renamed the Diocese of Oppido Mamertina in the diocese of Oppido Mamertina-Palmi, the collegiate church of St. Nicholas assumed the title of co-cathedral the diocese.

== Description ==
The building is in Romanesque Revival architecture style. In the main facade is placed an artistic canopy and a porch and a small "portico" with four columns. On the left side there is the civic tower town which functions also as a bell tower of the church.

In its interior, with a Latin cross plan, there is a nave and two aisles on which there are two apses, respectively, to Saint Nicholas, the patron saint of Palmi, and to the Sacred Heart.

Above the cover are octagonal dome, without windows, and side of the church there is a chapel to officiate minor functions.

In the walls of the aisles there are a painting of "Saint Joseph with the Child Jesus" (1892), a painting of "Saint Francis of Assisi in adoration of the Cross" (1932), a wooden statue of "Saint Joseph with the Child Jesus" (18th century), and a statue a wooden "Assumption of Mary" (18th century).

On the main altar, made of marble, is exposed a precious ancient icon of "Our Lady of the Letter" (1774).

In a chapel, built recently, is a shrine in which is placed the relic of the Holy Hair.

== Sources ==
- Pacichelli, Giovan Battista (1702). Il Regno di Napoli in prospettiva [The Kingdom of Naples in Perspective]. Naples.
- Annibale Riccò, E. Camerana, Mario Baratta, Giovanni Di Stevano, Committee in charge of studies by the Royal Government for the study on the earthquake of November 16, 1894 in Calabria and Sicily, ed. Tipografia nazionale de G. Bertero e c., 1907;
- Antonio De Salvo, Research and historical studies around Palmi, Seminara and Gioia Tauro, ed. Lopresti, 1889;
