= Senate of Messina =

15th–17th century institution in Italy

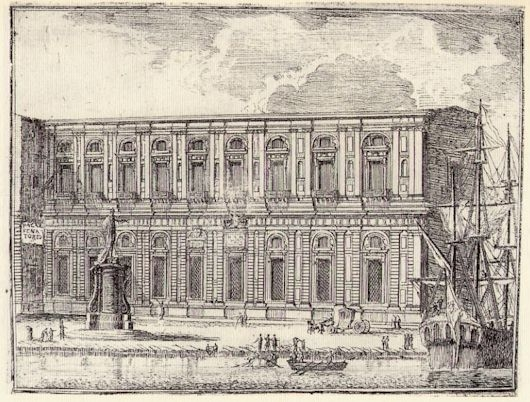
Senate and Loggia of the Merchants (Loggia dei Mercanti).

The Senate of Messina was an ancient city institution, emblem of the privileges enjoyed by the city of the strait from the 15th to the 17th century. The civic assembly, to which the members of the city nobility belonged, but also of the neighboring fiefdoms, finished exercising its functions in 1678, when it was suppressed by the Spaniards.

== Background ==
Messina, already in prehistoric times, was on a route of high importance for Mediterranean traffic and, with the advent of the Romans, it became the main port of Sicily. In this period the city of Messina became Civitas foederata of Rome obtaining numerous privileges also in the maritime and commercial sectors.

With the Normans, and with Count Roger in particular, Messina and its port became even more important. In this period the city became the seat of the Consulate of the Sea, a tribunal made up of consuls freely elected by merchants and navigiorum primates which issued rules and ordinances for the regulation of relations between merchants, exempted the people of Messina from taxes, customs and other payments by sea and by land and established other commercial advantages which further enhanced traffic.

There were links between the senators of Messina or Catania, for example, who belonged to the same families: Francesco Bisagni (1568) had senatorial ancestors in both cities.

The Consulate of the Sea, the construction of a new arsenal and of the dock, the establishment of an admiralty with jurisdiction over the port, the coasts, the littoral and the shipbuilding, together with many other privileges granted to the city, therefore contributed to making it one of the most important ports in the Mediterranean, both from a military and commercial point of view.

== History ==
The Senates were established by the Spaniards in the main cities of the island, from Palermo to Trapani, to Syracuse. To the Norman-type privileges, the Aragonese added others in the fourteenth century. With Alfonso the Magnanimous, the maximum privilege of the city of Messina was recognized: the Senate, which became one of the hubs of the city administration.

In 1507, crowded with merchants from all over the world, to negotiate the prices of goods in precarious and unsuitable places, such as the Palazzo della Dogana, the city sent an embassy to Spain to ask Ferdinand II of Aragon for a fixed headquarters to conduct these dealings. The monarch agreed and work began.

It was then decided to build the Loggia facing the sea, next to the turreted gate of the Dogana Vecchia, so called because it led to the Palazzo della Dogana, already a favorite meeting place for merchants. The works ended in 1527. After completing the one-story building, it was understood that, due to its centrality, that building could also be the seat of other bodies or institutions. For which, in 1589, a significant expansion of the building was decided, in which the seats of the Tavola Pecuniaria and the Senate were transferred.

The works of the Loggia dei Mercanti, with the adjoining Senate, were definitively completed in 1599. Economic activity and commerce flourished for centuries, but the privileges enjoyed by Messina exacerbated relations with the other competing cities of the island and, above all, with Palermo, whose ruling class managed to convince the Spanish rulers to reduce the advantages and the benefits enjoyed by Messina and its port.

=== The anti-Spanish revolt ===
In 1671, General Luis dell'Hojo, stratigotus of the city, then began a harmful campaign to create factions and instigate divisions in the city: he cajoled the plebs and indulged the nobles, insinuating the worm of suspicion against the people; he blamed the arrogance of the nobles for the decadence, for the violence in the city and for the hunger suffered by the poor; to the rich, however, he suggested that the people were planning a revolt against them. Hojo's bad intentions had their effect, and the people armed themselves to attack the houses of the senators, putting them to fire and sword.

For the first time Messina found itself divided into two factions, the Merli and the Malvizzi (the "thrushes" in the local dialect). The former wanted to maintain the privileges that the city had acquired over time and maintain the senatorial class, the latter advocated a government made by the people.

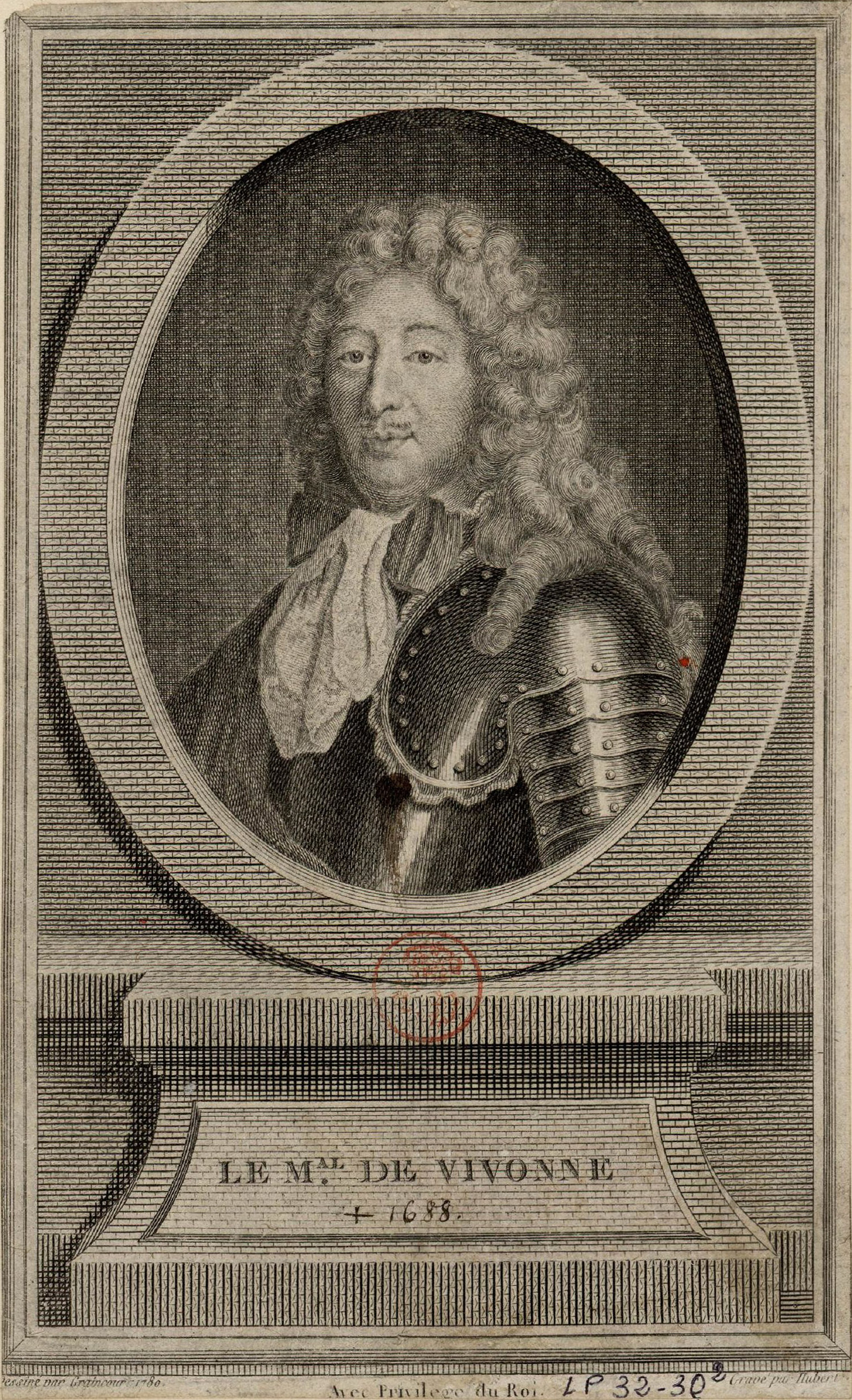
The Duke of Vivonne.

The people of Messina, resolved to break definitively with Spain, decided to ask for the protection of the King of France, Louis XIV. The latter accepted the proposal and in 1675 sent the Duke of Vivonne, Louis Victor de Rochechouart de Mortemart to Messina. He arrived in the city in February 1675. A terrible battle ensued near the Aeolian Islands, which ended with the defeat of the Spaniards. The Duke of Vivonne triumphantly entered the port of Messina with his galleys, where he was received with great honors.

The Senate, in the name of the city of Messina, swore allegiance to the King of France. After this episode the struggle between Messina, aided by the French, and Spain lasted for a long time with no holds barred both by sea and by land until 1678. In that year, in fact, unbeknownst to Messina, the Kings of France and Spain signed a peace treaty, the Treaty of Nijmegen which put an end to the war in Holland. French troops in April of that year withdrew from Messina under the orders of the Marquis de Lafeuillade.

Messina alone could not withstand the impact of the Spanish forces and the revenge and hatred of the troops fell upon the city. Every privilege was lost, the Senate was abolished, the Mint was transferred to Palermo, the university was abolished, the archive was stripped and transferred to Palermo, and a Citadel was built in the crescent-shaped area. King Charles II of Habsburg had the grandiose Messina senate razed to the ground, he had the ground where it stood sprinkled with salt and in his place he erected a statue depicting him.

== Roles of the Senate ==
The Senate performed largely the same functions that the municipal council of a city would perform today. The history of Messina sees it in 1650 among the ten largest and most important cities in all of Europe, with a primary cultural role for all of the West, as well as the main strategic military and commercial base for the whole Mediterranean.

In 1547, the Senate of Messina commissioned Giovanni Angelo Montorsoli to build a fountain in Piazza del Duomo, at the mouth of the Camaro aqueduct (built in 1530–47), which was of public utility, decorum and celebration of public power and of the enterprise. This work of sculpture, the fountain of Orion, also had notable functions of urban scenography.

In June 1575 a great plague broke out in Messina which lasted thirty years and led to the death of over 40,000 people. During the epidemic, the sailors of the city of Palmi, with an impulse of human solidarity, helped the inhabitants of Messina by hosting them, assisting them and sending them food. During their continuous interventions they did not care about the danger of being able to contract the infection, nor of being imprisoned if they were caught crossing the sanitary cordon that the authorities had created to prevent the spread of the disease. As soon as the terrible disease subsided, the Senate of Messina wanted to donate to the city of Palmi one of the Hair of the Madonna that the ambassadors had brought from Jerusalem, as a tangible sign of gratitude for the help given by the Palmese sailors.

In 1668, the Senate of Messina gave the Florentine goldsmith Innocenzo Mangani the task of manufacturing the Golden Manta of the Madonna, kept in the Cathedral, used only on great celebrations.

== Sources ==
- La rivolta di Messina (1674-78) e il mondo mediterraneo nella seconda metà del Seicento, Saverio Di Bella, 2001.
- Capitoli e privilegi di Messina, Palermo, 1937.
