= Palmi, Calabria =

Palmi Parmi (Sicilian)
- Comune
- Città di Palmi
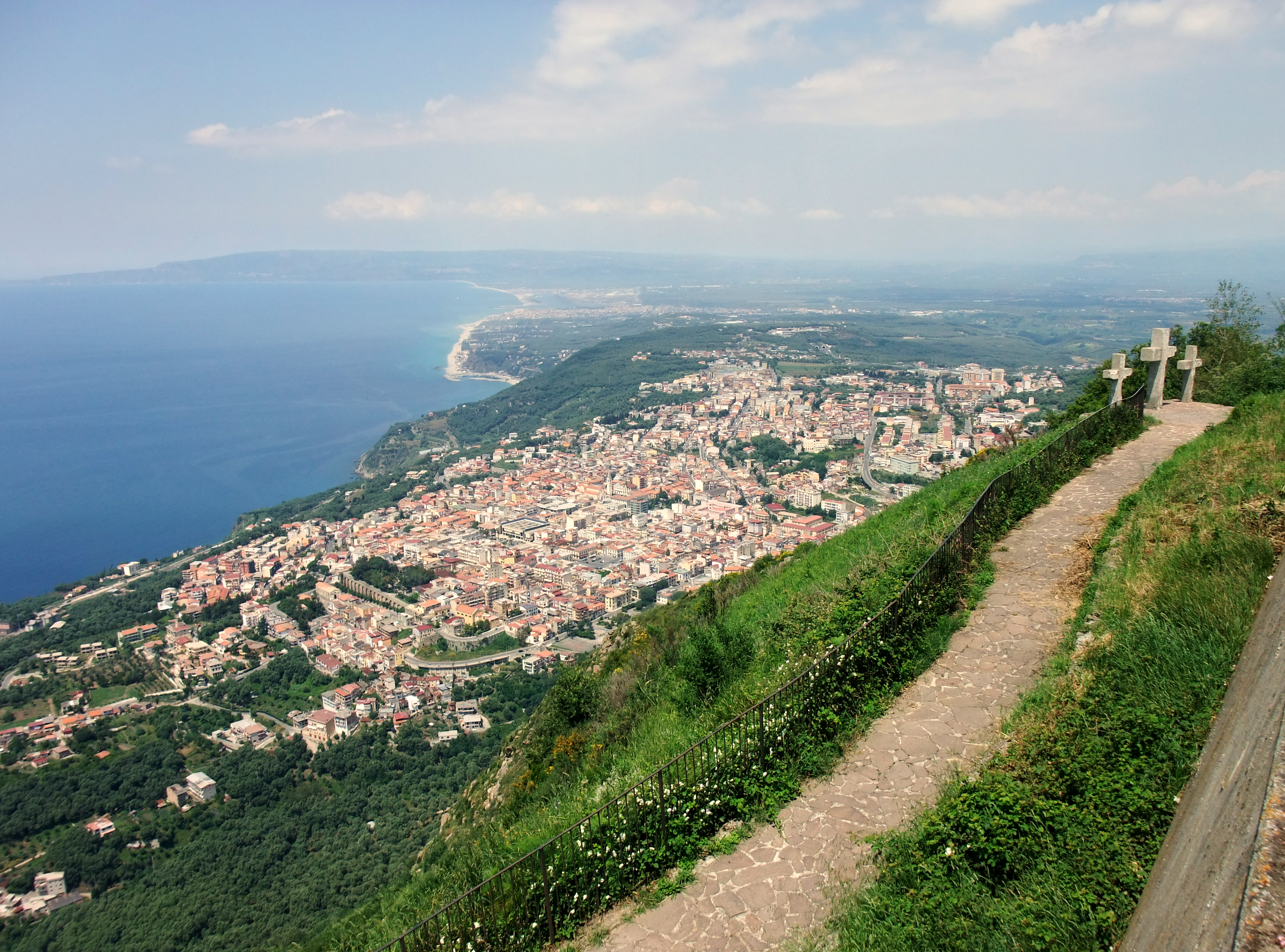

- Coat of arms

- Location within Italy Location within Calabria
- Coordinates: 38°22′N 15°51′E
- Country: Italy
- Region: Calabria
- Metropolitan city: Reggio Calabria (RC)

Government
  - Mayor: Giovanni Calabria (dal 25 maggio 2026) (Centrodestra)

Area
  - Total: 31.8 km^{2} (12.3 sq mi)
- Elevation: 228 m (748 ft)

Population (January 2009)
  - Total: 19,569
  - Density: 615/km^{2} (1,590/sq mi)
- Demonym: Palmesi
- Time zone: UTC+1 (CET)
  - Summer (DST): UTC+2 (CEST)
- Postal code: 89015
- Dialing code: 0966
- Patron saint: Saint Nicholas
- Saint day: 6 December
- Website: Official website

Palmi (Italian: [ˈpalmi]; Reggino: Parmi; Latin: Palmae) is a comune (municipality) of about 19,303 inhabitants in the province of Reggio Calabria in Calabria.

It is seat of the district, which includes 33 municipalities in the plain of Gioia Tauro, with a population of approximately 170,000 inhabitants.

With the nearby beaches of Marina di Palmi and Lido di Palmi, overlooking the Violet coast, the city is a major seaside resort thanks to its landscape, which has led writers and poets to call it the "terrace on the Strait of Messina".

In addition to being the main administrative center, office and school of the Tyrrhenian coast of the province of Reggio Calabria, Palmi was also an important agricultural and commercial center and a bishopric of Roman Catholic Diocese of Oppido Mamertina-Palmi.

For centuries, the city was one of the most important cultural centers of Calabria in the literary, musical, historical and archaeological interest. Notable people from the area include, among others, the composer Francesco Cilea, and the writer Leonida Repaci. It also houses the museum complex of the House of Culture and the Archaeological park of Tauriani, on the ruins of the ancient city of Tauriana. In the latter lived in Saint Fantino, the oldest saint of Calabria and the crypt, which contained his remains, is currently the oldest catholic place of worship in the region.

In addition to Palmi are celebrated two holidays of national importance. The two events are the Varia di Palmi, inserted in 2013 in the UNESCO "Masterpieces of the Oral and Intangible Heritage of Humanity", and the feast of Saint Roch with the "procession of barbed wire".

== History ==
=== Toponymy ===
About the origins of the name given to Palmi is a constant tradition, followed over the centuries to its foundation, it has acquired its name because of the many palm trees that stood in its territory, so much so that the indication De Palmis, Roger I Count Calabria specified grant of the Church of San Georgium, in 1085, the Church of St. Mary of the Twelve apostles and Bagnara Calabra. Dominus Palmae was called instead by Baron De Iacobus Roto of Seminara in the records of the Angevin barons of Calabria in 1333, while in the following centuries, the ancient Civitas Palmarum notaries they used the expression to indicate Palmi. Which, in the 16th century, by Gabriel Barrio was called to Parma while Lando Alberti was appointed as Palma. Carlopoli was also named in the aforesaid century, in honor of the Duke Carlo Spinelli, who rebuilt the fortress after a Saracen devastation, so much so that in 1567 are given the title of oppidum (a confirmation of fortification) and Palma nunc Carlopoli assuming that the new Carlopoli was built next to the old town. Only in 1669 it began to be written Palmi, but with the start of the 18th century, the city was known as ordinarily Palme, a name that always prevailed until the unification of Italy (1860), where it settled as Palmi.

=== Prehistory and antiquity ===
The municipal area was already inhabited by the Bronze Age, as evidenced by findings obtained in the excavations conducted in the "Cave of Pietrosa" or hut remains discovered in Taureana of Palmi.

From the 4th century BC and up to the 10th century, in the municipality developed on the city of Tauriana before Brettia and Roman. The latter was in 951, which was destroyed by the troops of the Emir Palermo Hasan Ibn Ali, for failure tribute owed by the Byzantines to which belonged the extreme southern Italy. Fleeing, the part of Taurianensi dedicated to traffic and the arts seamanship chose and planted the upper part of the coast, between Monte Aulinas and the river Metaurus, in district De Palmis where there were houses of the Tauriani.

=== Middle Ages ===
The small town, hamlet of Seminara and feudal lords of the latter, was hit again in the course of centuries by Saracen pirates until, in 1549, after the devastation of the last feudal lord Duke Charles Spinelli decided to fortify it. In this way, the city took on a rectangular shape and was surrounded by walls with four imposing towers which stood extremes. In that century, the city grew in importance attracting all the maritime trade of the southern coast of Calabria.

Independent of Seminara in 1632 in the 17th century, the city developed urbanistically and economically thanks to the commercial activity of its inhabitants and the foresight of the Marquis Andrea Arena Concublet that instituted a "fair". The walls to the east fell gradually to allow the coupling to the new agglomerations were to be formed as a result of population growth. Also in the 17th century the urban fabric focused around a node formed by the new "Market Square".

=== Early modern ===
In the 18th century Palmi crossed one of the most flourishing periods of its history, until 1783, when it was hit by an earthquake which resulted in 1,400 deaths. The reconstruction of the city took part following the plan prepared by Ing. G. De Cosiron.

The city was placed in the capital of the district in 1806. In 1860 took the landing of Giuseppe Garibaldi and his expedition of the Thousand to Marina di Palmi, and the event had put to flight the large garrison Bourbon in town. With 'Unification of Italy, the district was repealed and the city was placed at the head of the district of Palmi (abolished in 1927).

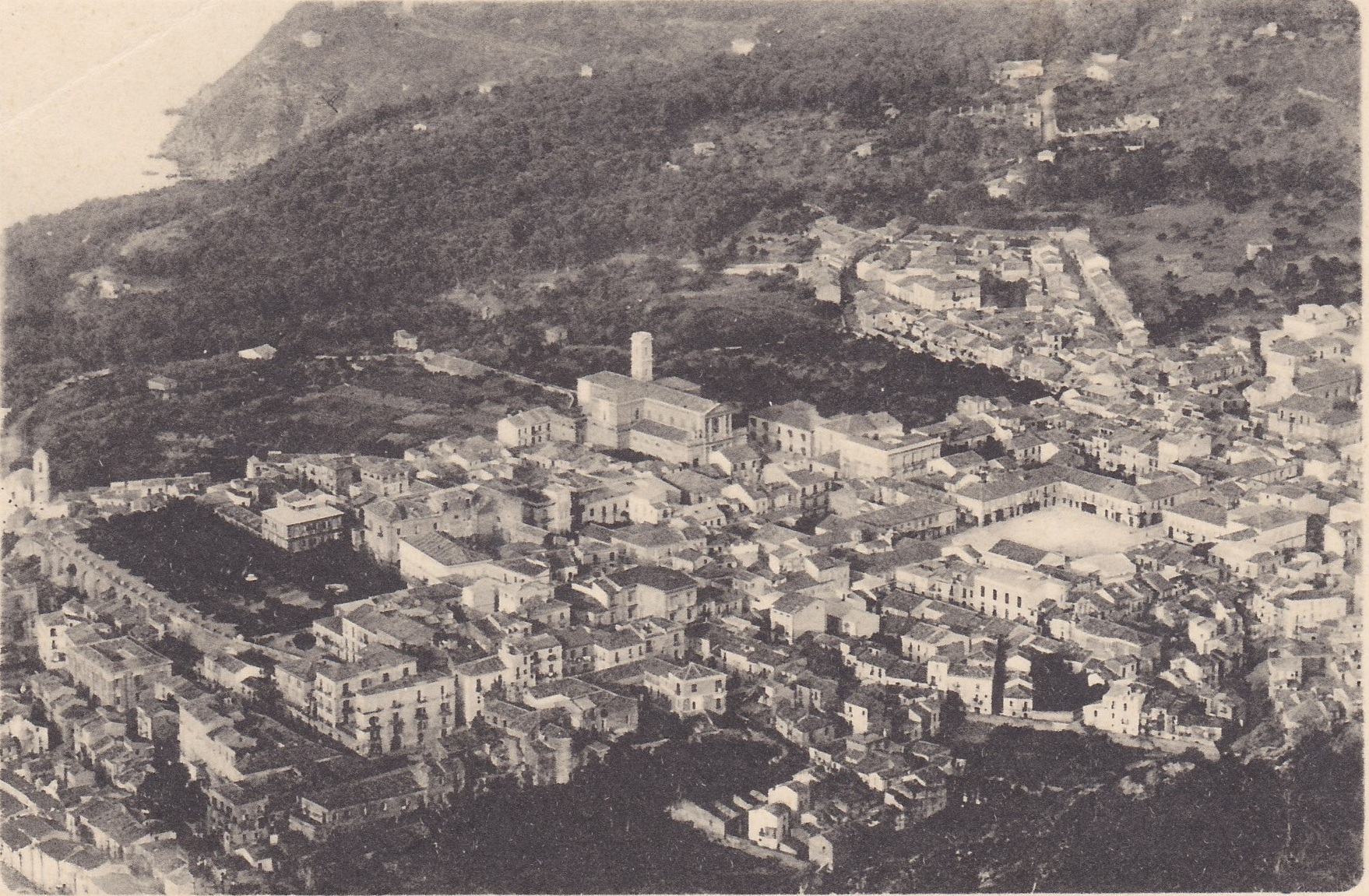
View of Palmi at the beginning of the 20th century

In 1894, the city was the epicenter of an earthquake. Despite the power of the shock and the great ruins that produced, the number of deaths was only eight, of this was due to a condition referred to as miraculous, which coincided with the history of the miracle of Our Lady of Mount Carmel Palmi.

In 1908 Palmi was almost totally destroyed by the violent earthquake of December 28, which resulted in about 600 deaths. The town was rebuilt. Pucci stavolgendo almost completely urban planning of the past centuries. The reconstruction, which involved the entire first half of the 20th century, gave the city a pleasant appearance, with the uniformity of the volumes, with the neoclassical style of the new buildings and the construction of monuments and works of art.

World War II saw the urban development in the field of tertiary putting Palmi as the main administrative center, office and school of the Tyrrhenian coast of the province through the establishment of secondary schools, facilities of the armed forces, health facilities and judicial offices and other public and private entities.

In 1999 was established by the Province of Reggio Calabria, the Environment of the Plain, renamed in 2008 district of Palmi.

== Geography ==
=== Topography ===
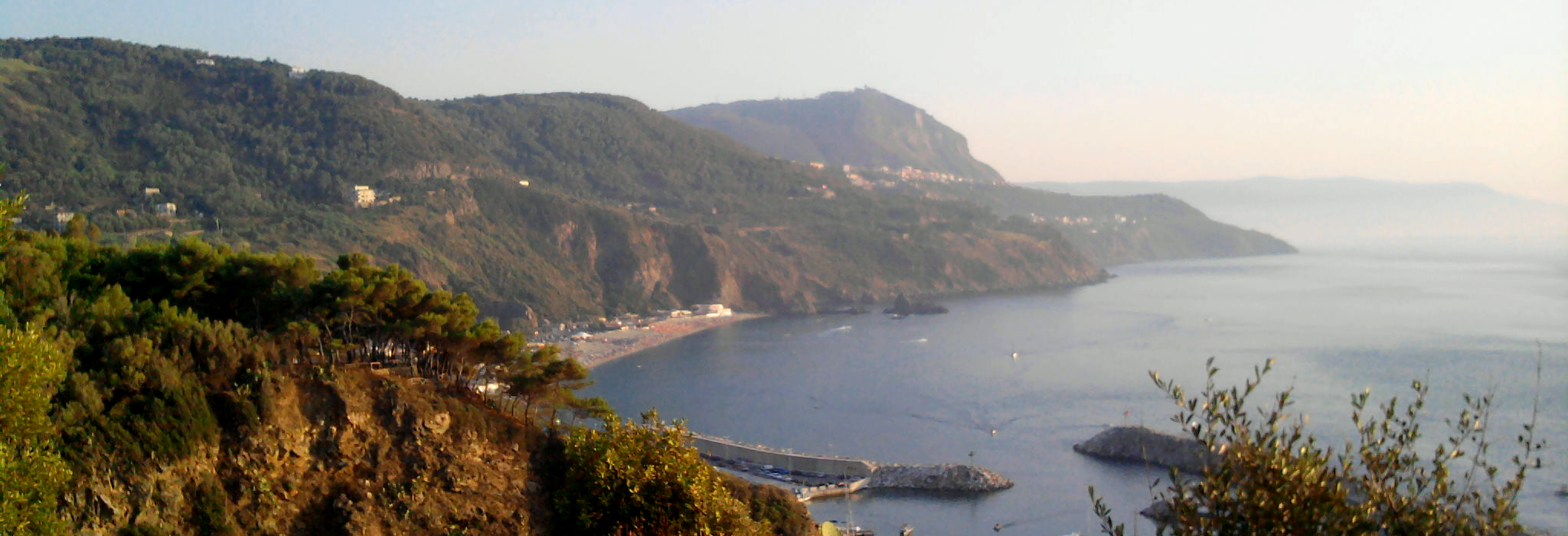
Bay of Tonnara di Palmi, in the background, the plateau of Palmi and Monte Sant'Elia.

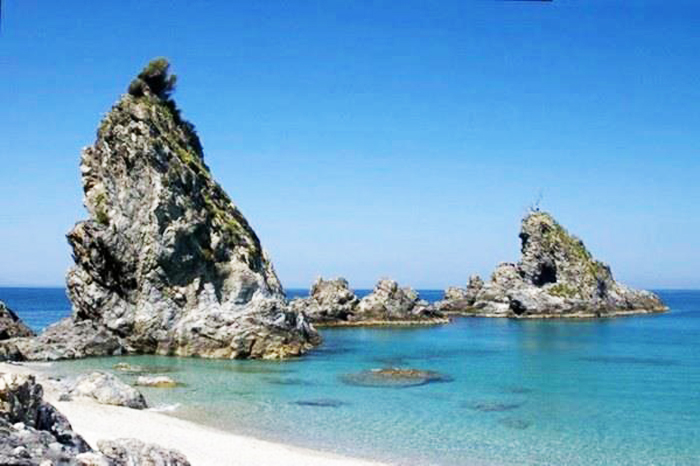
The reef of the Olive. (in italian: Scoglio dell'ulivo)

Palmi, overlooking the Tyrrhenian Sea, is located close to the slopes of Monte Sant'Elia, on a terrace overlooking a stretch of the Violet Coast.

Much of the territory is formed by a series of terraced hills that rapidly degrade the sea through a system of cliffs, small beaches and cliffs. The remaining part of the municipal area is made up to the south by Monte Sant'Elia and to the north-west by a flat area on which stand the districts comprising the seaside Lido di Palmi.

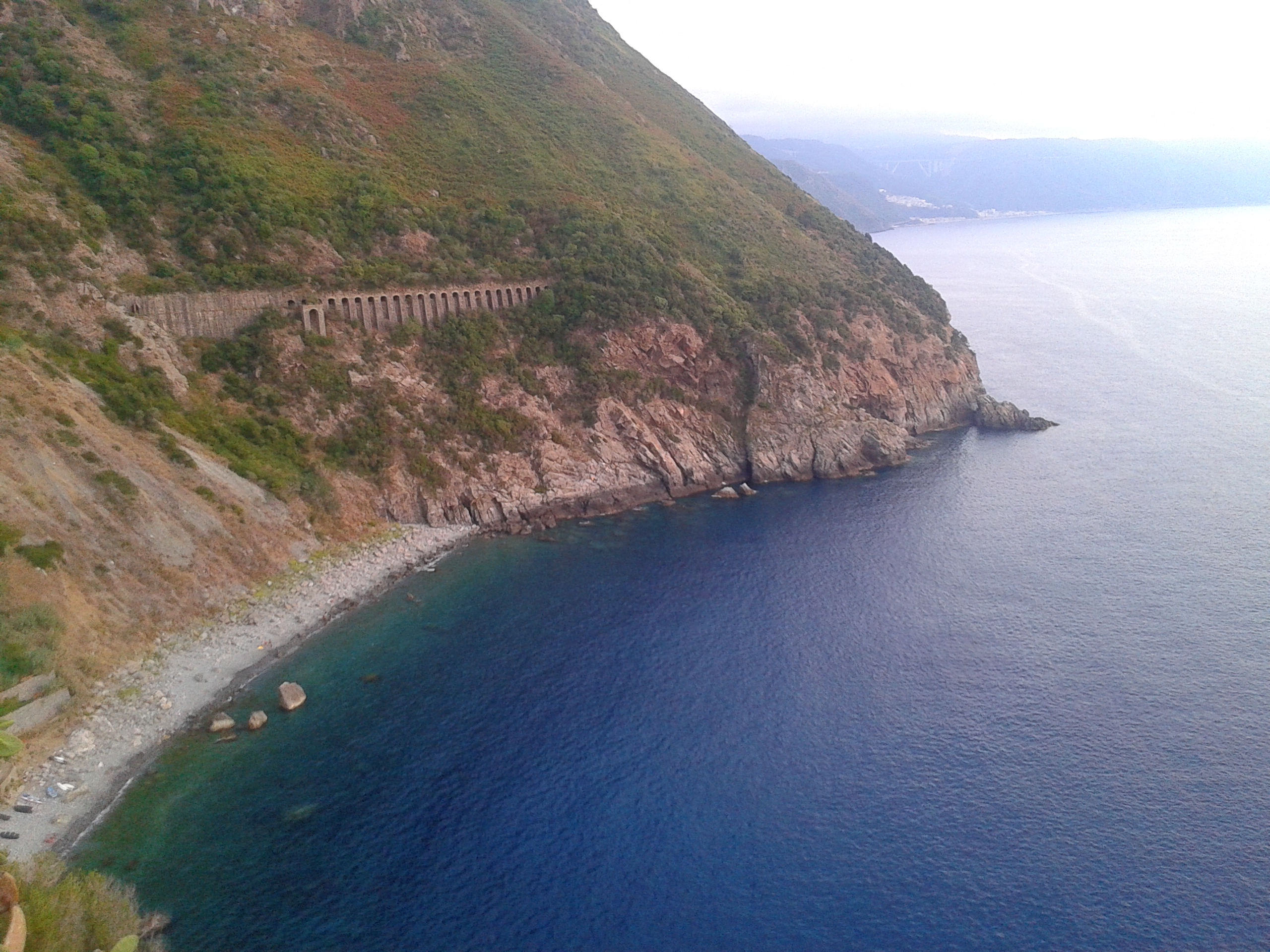
The bay of Marina di Palmi

The main waterway is the river that marks the border Petrace north-east of the township, the resort Pontevecchio to its mouth on the Tyrrhenian Sea.

The most westerly tip is called Cape Barbi, and from this promontory starts the Violet Coast. The name comes from the fact that the sea, a short distance from the coast, reaches great depths by placing the water a deep blue color that the sun, at sunset (between May and September), color with violet reflections. A little further south is the Cape Motta.

The whole coast of Palmi, in which are located the bay of the Marinella and the bay of Tonnara, is enriched with marine and coastal caves and reefs. Among the first are the "cave of the Sirens", the "cave dell'Arcudace" and the "cave Perciata" while the rocks are the main stumbling "reef Trachini", "Stone Galera", "the reef of island" and "reefs Agliastro". Among the latter is the reef of the Olive, which is a rock on top of which is grown in the past centuries, an olive tree.

A part of the area included in the list of Special Protection Area and Site of Community Importance of Calabria.

=== Climate ===
Climate data for Palmi elevation 267 meters (876 feet) Median Temperatures (1951-1980) extremes (1950-2015)
Month	Jan	Feb	Mar	Apr	May	Jun	Jul	Aug	Sep	Oct	Nov	Dec	Year
Record high °C (°F)	26.8 (80.2)	28.0 (82.4)	34.3 (93.7)	35.0 (95.0)	40.1 (104.2)	45.0 (113.0)	45.6 (114.1)	46.0 (114.8)	43.7 (110.7)	42.6 (108.7)	35.4 (95.7)	31.0 (87.8)	46.0 (114.8)
Mean daily maximum °C (°F)	16.0 (60.8)	16.2 (61.2)	18.0 (64.4)	20.7 (69.3)	24.8 (76.6)	29.5 (85.1)	31.8 (89.2)	33.0 (91.4)	29.8 (85.6)	26.0 (78.8)	21.0 (69.8)	17.5 (63.5)	23.71 (74.68)
Daily mean °C (°F)	12.7 (54.9)	12.7 (54.9)	14.1 (57.4)	17.1 (62.8)	20.6 (69.1)	25.0 (77.0)	27.8 (82.0)	28.9 (84.0)	26.2 (79.2)	22.1 (71.8)	17.8 (64.0)	14.7 (58.5)	19.68 (67.42)
Mean daily minimum °C (°F)	9.4 (48.9)	9.2 (48.6)	10.2 (50.4)	13.5 (56.3)	16.4 (61.5)	20.5 (68.9)	23.8 (74.8)	24.8 (76.6)	22.6 (72.7)	18.2 (64.8)	14.6 (58.3)	11.9 (53.4)	16.71 (62.08)
Record low °C (°F)	0.3 (32.5)	−0.7 (30.7)	1.6 (34.9)	6.3 (43.3)	8.0 (46.4)	12.5 (54.5)	16.0 (60.8)	16.0 (60.8)	13.2 (55.8)	9.8 (49.6)	7.1 (44.8)	0.7 (33.3)	−0.7 (30.7)
Average precipitation mm (inches)	99.4 (3.91)	87.4 (3.44)	67.8 (2.67)	52.0 (2.05)	34.9 (1.37)	12.4 (0.49)	0.9 (0.04)	1.5 (0.06)	42.8 (1.69)	103.7 (4.08)	110.4 (4.35)	127.7 (5.03)	740.9 (29.18)
Average precipitation days	12	10	9	7	5	3	2	2	5	9	10	13	88
Source: Centro Funzionale Multirischi della Calabria record di piano blog

== Demography ==
Historical population

Year	Pop.	±%
1861	9,030	—
1871	10,053	+11.3%
1881	10,926	+8.7%
1901	13,346	+22.1%
1911	14,160	+6.1%

Year	Pop.	±%
1921	14,959	+5.6%
1931	18,121	+21.1%
1936	18,179	+0.3%
1951	19,749	+8.6%
1961	18,448	−6.6%

Year	Pop.	±%
1971	17,721	−3.9%
1981	18,386	+3.8%
1991	19,116	+4.0%
2001	19,435	+1.7%
2009	19,569	+0.7%

Source: Data from ISTAT

=== Religion ===
The most widespread religion is Roman Catholic. With such a confession would be baptized on 98.1% of the population. The town is part of the Diocese of Oppido Mamertina-Palmi, which houses the offices, and is also seat of the vicariate. The district is now divided into five parishes. The municipal statute recognizes Saint Nicholas, as the patron of the city "to safeguard the Christian roots of their community". The Catholic Church has elected, 12 September 1733, the Our Lady of the Sacred Letter as patron of the city and the popular devotion, over the centuries, has elevated to the title of Saint Roch, patron and protector.

In ancient Tauriana and Monte Sant'Elia, before the foundation of Palmi, were born or have lived personality venerated as saints by the Catholic Church. These figures are the Saint Fantino the old, Saint Fantino the Young, Saint Elias of Enna and Saint Filarete.

The deep-rooted Catholic culture town is also evidenced by the institution of four lay confraternities and some convents male and female religious.

== Cityscape ==
=== Architecture ===
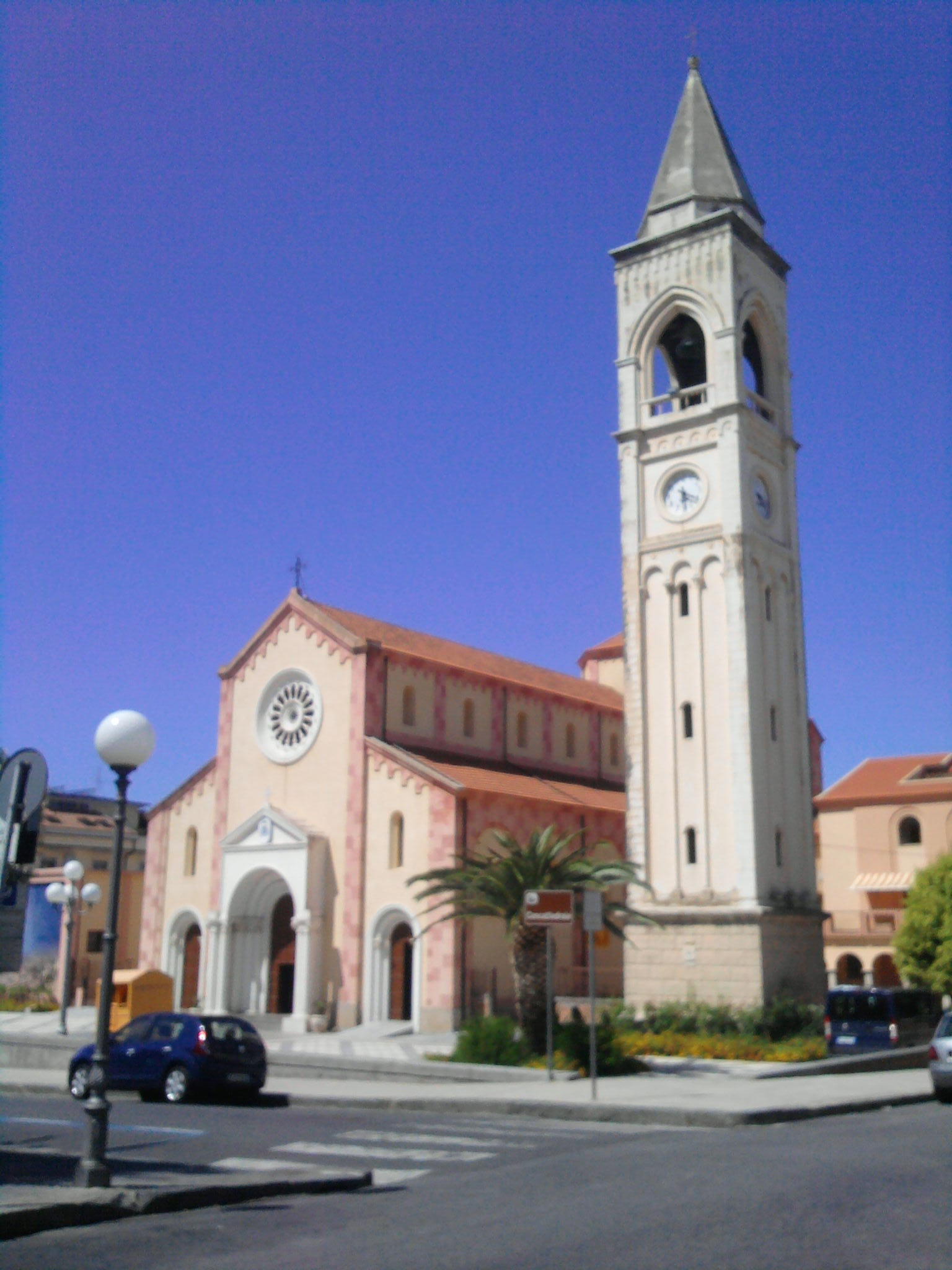
The Palmi Cathedral.

Almost all of the architecture in Palmi is of the 20th century, since the 1908 Messina earthquake destroyed the city completely. Of past centuries has remained the Watchtower (1565), the Church of the Crucifix (17th century), the Church of the Our Lady of the Help (1788) and the Temple of Saint Fantino (4th century), the oldest place of worship in Calabria which were crypt houses the remains of the saint. The other architectures have been so altered or rebuilt after 1908. The main one is the Cathedral of Saint Nicholas (1932), in Romanesque style, with near Civic Tower (1956). In front of the religious complex there is a communal palace, called Palazzo San Nicola (1932), and subsequently there is a park that houses the War Memorial of the First World War (produced by Michele Guerrisi). Nearby is the mausoleum of Francesco Cilea (1962), in which are the remains of the local artist. Of particular interest to the artistic and historical heritage is the shrine of Our Lady of Mount Carmel, in Baroque style, bound to its high value.

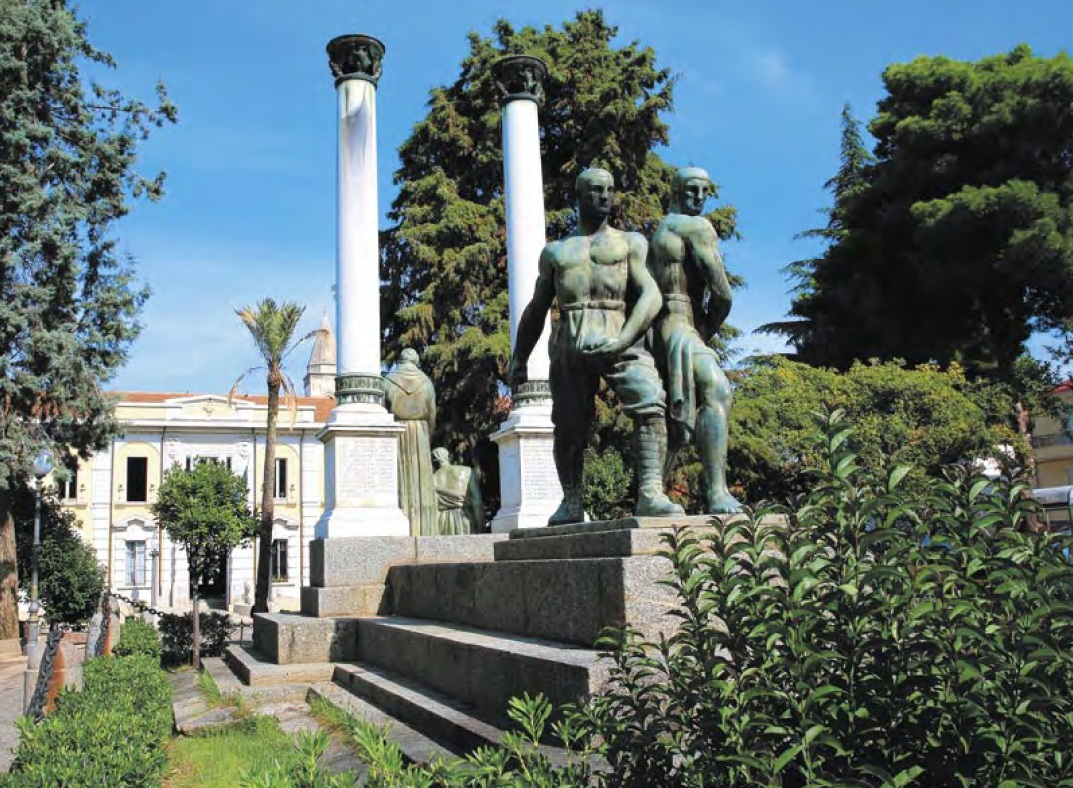
The War Memorial of the First World War.

The other churches are dedicated to Our Lady of the Rosary (1937), Immaculate Conception and Saint Roch (1952), Adoration (1966) and the Holy Family (2005). This is an example of modern religious architecture. Of note, the church of Saint Elijah (1958) reconstructed in a place where a church was built in 884 by St. Elias of Enna.

The old town is full of civil architecture of neoclassical style and the fascist period. Among the most important are two buildings designed by Marcello Piacentini. In addition Palmi is rich in monumental fountains. The main one is the "fountain of Palm"(1922) built in Baroque style, the type Bernini modern, for which he was issued a national stamp. The most recent is the "fountain of Saint Roch" (2010). Other important monuments are the obelisk to Our Lady of Mount Carmel, the monument to Saint Francis of Assisi and some Roman columns found in the archaeological remains of Tauriana.

At the Lido di Palmi is located on the Fort of Pietrenere. The work designed by the French military during the period of Joachim Murat, at the beginning of the 19th century.

The last structure to be reported is the Open Air Theatre (2000), which is perched on a terrace which is admirable the Straits of Messina and the centers of Scilla and Bagnara Calabra. The property hosts numerous events "Summer of Palmi" and has a capacity of 1,000 seats.

=== Parks ===
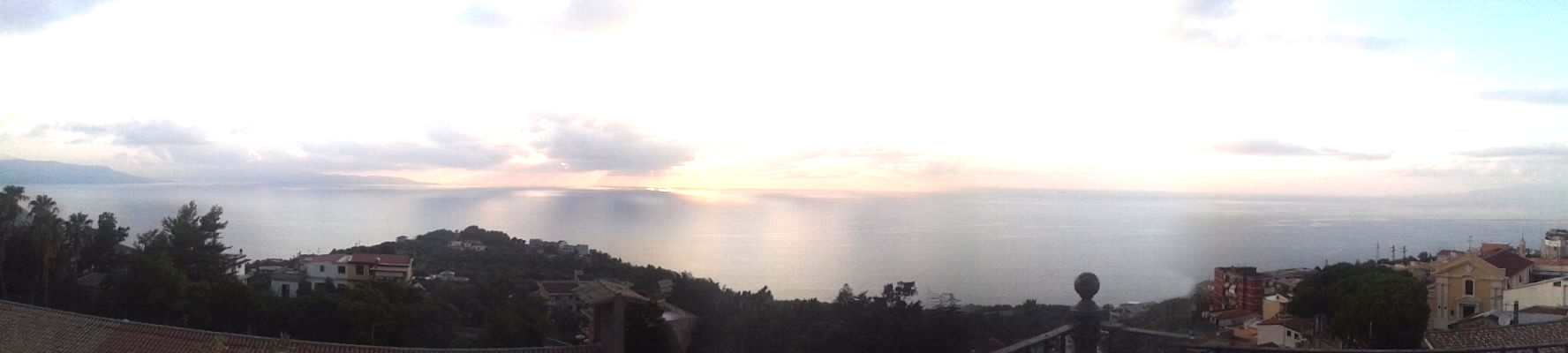
View of the Villa Comunale.

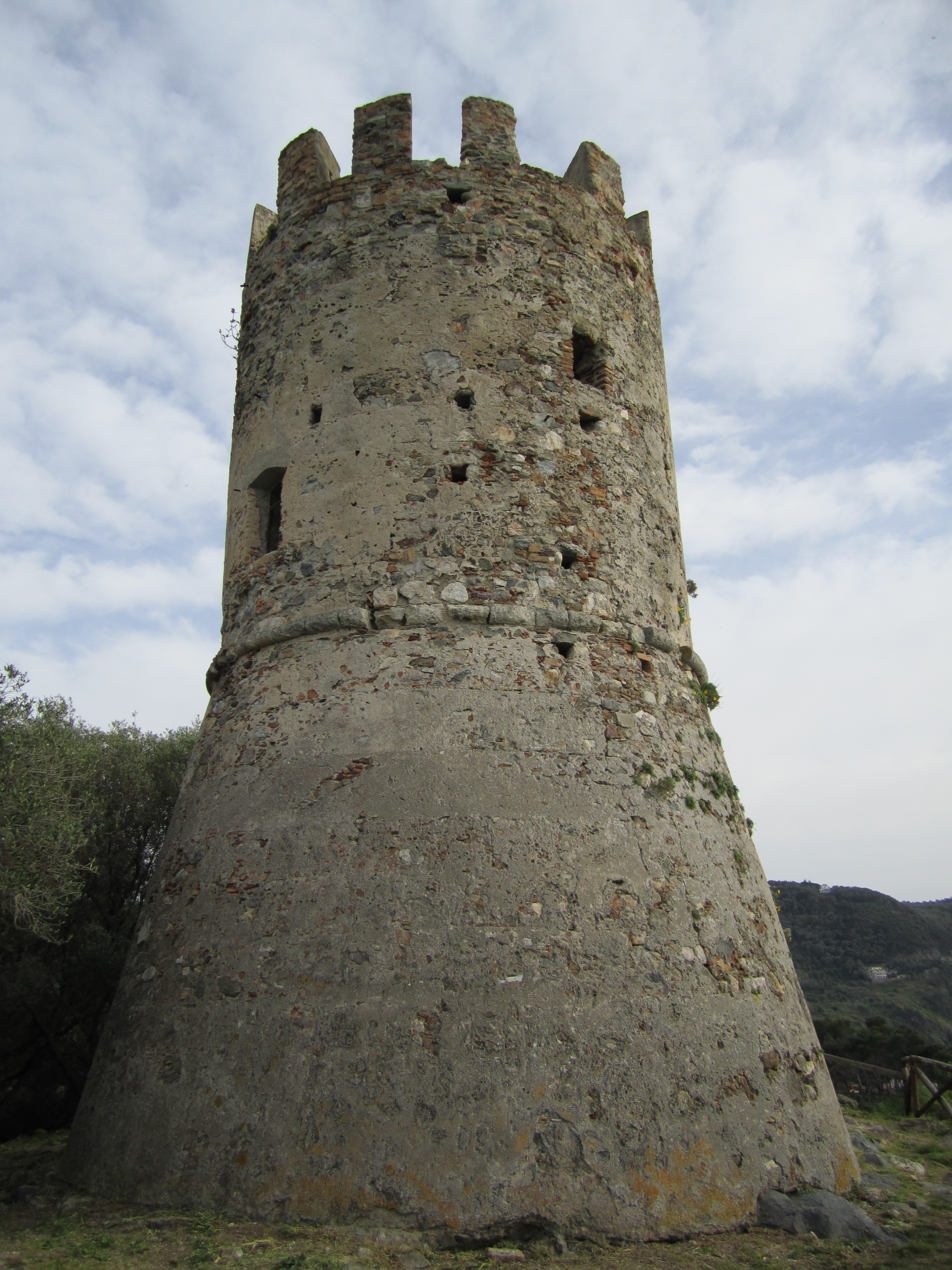
the Watchtower.

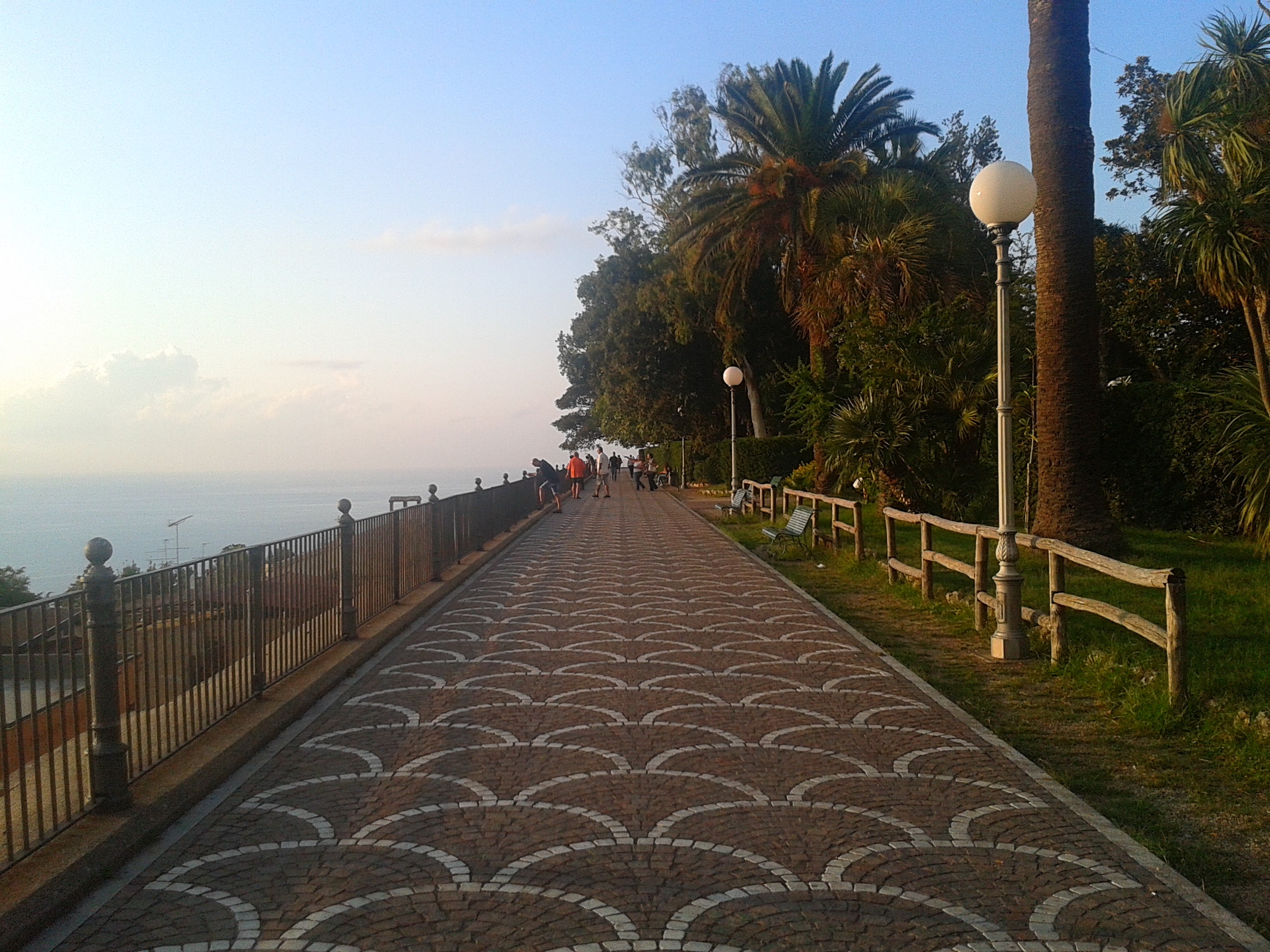
the Villa Comunale "Giuseppe Mazzini".

The main natural area is the Villa Comunale "Giuseppe Mazzini", a public park in the historic center built in the 19th century and falls in the list of "National Monuments". To confirm this, in 1927, a decree was issued constraint for "panoramic scenes from the place that they enjoy". The park, from whose balcony are wonderful the Tyrrhenian Sea, the Straits of Messina and the Aeolian Islands, Scilla and Bagnara Calabra, consists of tall trees, with cobblestone walkways, a small fountain and some marble busts.

The Archaeological park of Tauriani, opened in 2011, consists of the archaeological sites of the ruins of the ancient Tauriana. In the park there are the Watchtower, the remains of a theater having from 3,000 spectators, a Roman road that led to Via Popilia, a Roman sanctuary, a "House with mosaic" dating from the 1st century BC, an ancient Roman residential district and a protohistoric village with huts dating back to the Bronze Age (4,000 years ago). Not far from the park there are the caves of Pignarelle, forming a rock settlement of Byzantine monastic origin, made by the monks themselves between the 6th and 8th centuries, digging in the sandstone. The complex consists of several caves, the largest of which appears to have a shape of a basilica with three naves with side corridors that form a cross in the shape of a Greek cross, and some tunnels. Testimony of the prehistoric age is also the cave of Pietrosa, the cavity formed by a single large underground environment in which it is a human settlement since the Bronze Age and the Helladic period, as shown by the pottery found in it.

== Economy ==
The service sector is the main driver of the city economy, especially in the presence of public and private offices (law firms and professional). The city is the seat of the court, prison, police, Court of Assize, Judiciary Police, firefighters, health organizations, general hospital, high school, universities and other offices of decentralization of the Italian Agency of Revenue. From the point of view of trade, the development of Palmi is served primarily by small business, especially apparel and clothing boutiques, bars and restaurants, mostly located in the historic center. The other main source of the city's economy is tourism.

=== Tourism ===
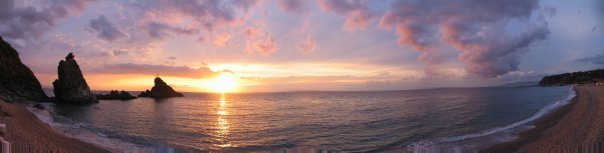
Beach of Lido di Palmi. (in italian: Spiaggia dell'ulivarella)

Palmi is one of the major tourist destinations of the Province of Reggio Calabria in the sea. The beach Rovaglioso scored in 2013, the recognition by Legambiente as the "most beautiful beach in Calabria" and among the top 17 beaches in Italy. The other beaches of Lido di Palmi, which attract many tourists, in 2010, received the award of two "Blue Sails ", always by Legambiente, placing the city in second place in the entire Tyrrhenian coast, in the stretch between Tropea and Strait of Messina. In addition Palmi is a tourist destination for summer events organized within the "Summer of Palmi". Regarding the tourism infrastructure in the city center you can find many hotel facilities while in the seaside suburbs of Taureana and Lido di Palmi are located various hotels, beaches, restaurants and campsites.

== Transport ==
The main road infrastructure that crosses the city of Palmi is the motorway A2 Salerno-Reggio di Calabria, in the municipality, has two outputs, the "release of Palmi" and the "release of Sant'Elia". Besides the highway the most important way is the highway state roads 18 that runs through the urban area town for about 8 kilometres (5.0 mi). Other important routes are the roads that connect Palmi with Seminara and Taurianova.

The railway lines that run through the area of Palmi are two: the Battipaglia–Reggio di Calabria railway and the Gioia Tauro-Palmi railway, for a total of four train stations (Central Palmi, Palmi Trodio, Taureana, San Fantino).

Palmi is reachable by sea from the port in the bay of Tonnara. The structure is the main hub for tourism of the Tyrrhenian coast of southern Calabria, thanks to its 200 berths (300 in anticipation).

Urban mobility is given by the "Piana Palmi Multiservice", the public transport company of the city, connecting with each other the various neighborhoods of the city.

The nearest airport is that of Reggio Calabria.

== Education ==
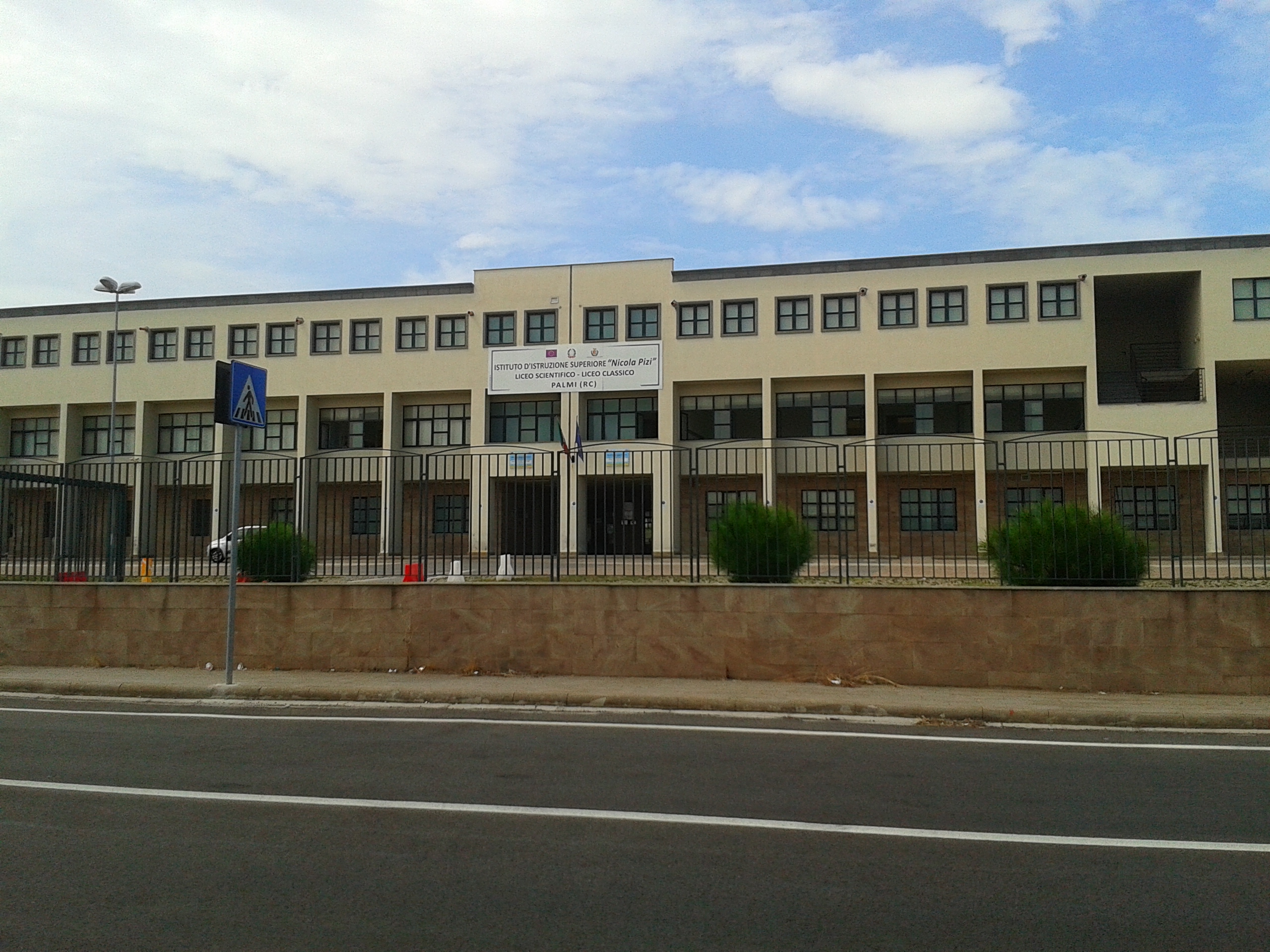
High School of sports, Palmi.

Palmi is, Reggio Calabria after, the main educational center of the province with approximately 6,000 students and 43 schools. Based in a city library, which has more than 120,000 volumes and is specializing in the history and literature of Calabria, a school of applied psychology which is a center for research and education and a private university in which active undergraduate courses in law, economics, political science and education. The public schools consist of two elementary schools, three middle schools and many secondary schools. The school is the oldest high school classic, established in 1889. Was born in 1909 instead of the Agrarian Institute, with the support of the American Red Cross $250,000. In 1961 were founded the Institute of Technical Sales and the Teaching Institute was founded in 1968 as a school of art. In 1971 was created the high school and sports. In addition to these schools, over the years they were born a Professional Institute of Industry and Handicrafts and the private technical institute.

== Culture ==
=== Entertainment ===
There are many events that take place in Palmi, especially in the summer ("Summer of Palmi") and with religious significance. The main one is the Varia di Palmi, inserted in 2013 in the list of UNESCO "Masterpieces of the Oral and Intangible Heritage of Humanity", which is a huge holy wagon that represents the universe and the Assumption of the Virgin Mary. Above the sacred chariot, 200 "mbuttaturi" (carriers) carry 16-metre (52 ft) tall human figures: "Animella" (child representing the Virgin Mary) and human figures representing "Padreterno" God, the apostles, and angels. The 2013 edition saw the participation of about 180,000 spectators.

Important is also the feast of Saint Roch (16 August). There are numerous traditions. During the procession of the statue through the streets, some wearing faithful participate for votive offerings, stripped to the waist, a cloak of thorns of wild broom (called "spalas"). The procession lasts four and a half hours and covers 11 kilometres (7 mi) of road, with a participation of about 30,000 devotees. Another form of votive offering is wax, anatomical human, as a sign of gratitude for a miraculous healing.

The last of July is celebrated "Our Lady of the High Sea", with a procession of the statue in the sea with a boat, followed by a procession of boats and yachts. The procession of Saint Fantino instead is formed by a procession of horses and riders. Other processions are dedicated to the Crucifix, Saint Anthony, Our Lady of Mount Carmel, Our Lady of help (with torches), Saint Elia, Our Lady of the Mountain and the Immaculate and provide all of the small fairs and fireworks.

All religious festivals are accompanied by the city's "Parade of Giants". The Giants are two enormous papier-mâché figures that run through the city streets to the rhythm of drums. A represents a Saracen warrior named Grifone and the other a white woman named Mata.

=== Museums ===
The House of Culture Leonida Repaci, is a modern multi-purpose museum. Its construction began in 1968 by the will of the municipal administration of the time and under the auspices of Giacomo Mancini, then Minister of Public Works. The building was inaugurated on 17 January 1982 and named after the local writer Leonida Repaci in November 1984. The property has an area of over 2,000 square metres (22,000 ft^{2}), and inside there is a modern auditorium in which they are held conferences and meetings. Its construction was funded by the Region of Calabria, designed by technicians of the Superintendency of Public Works of Catanzaro and built by local craftsmen. In the House of Culture are located: the gallery " Leonida and Albertina Repaci", the ethnographic museum "Raffaele Corso", the library "Domenico Topa", the antiquarium "Nicola De Rosa", the museum music "Francesco Cilea and Nicola Antonio Manfroce", the plaster casts "Michele Guerrisi", the State Archives of Reggio Calabria - Section of Palmi.

== Notable people ==
- Leonida Repaci (writer, poet and political activist)
- Francesco Cilea (composer)
- Francesco Rèpaci (lawyer and politic. socialist and antifasicte)

== Sports ==
Football is the most popular sport in Palmi. The football team is the main U.S. Palmese 1912 that in the past he played for five seasons in the league of level III (now Lega Pro) missing, among other things, the playoffs in 1935 for access to the Serie B. In addition, in 1934, Palmese has played in Palmi two friendlies against AS Roma and AC Fiorentina.

Golem Volley is the town's professional women's volleyball club.

In road cycling, 25 May 1982, Palmi was home to start the 11th stage of the Giro d'Italia 1982. The city is crossed by the caravan of the Giro d'Italia in other 11 editions. In addition Palmi has been home to start, or passage, numerous editions of the Giro di Calabria and, above all, the Giro della Provincia di Reggio Calabria. On the ascent of Monte Sant'Elia, in the past the biggest names in Italian cycling gave the show in climbing to the summit. These included: Fausto Coppi, Gino Bartali, Felice Gimondi, Fiorenzo Magni, Francesco Moser, Gastone Nencini and Vittorio Adorni.

== Twin towns ==
- Viareggio, Italy
- Varazze, Italy
- Sassari, Italy
