= Monte Sant'Elia (Palmi) =

Mountain in Italy

Coordinates: 38°20′47″N 15°50′27″E

- Monte Aulinas
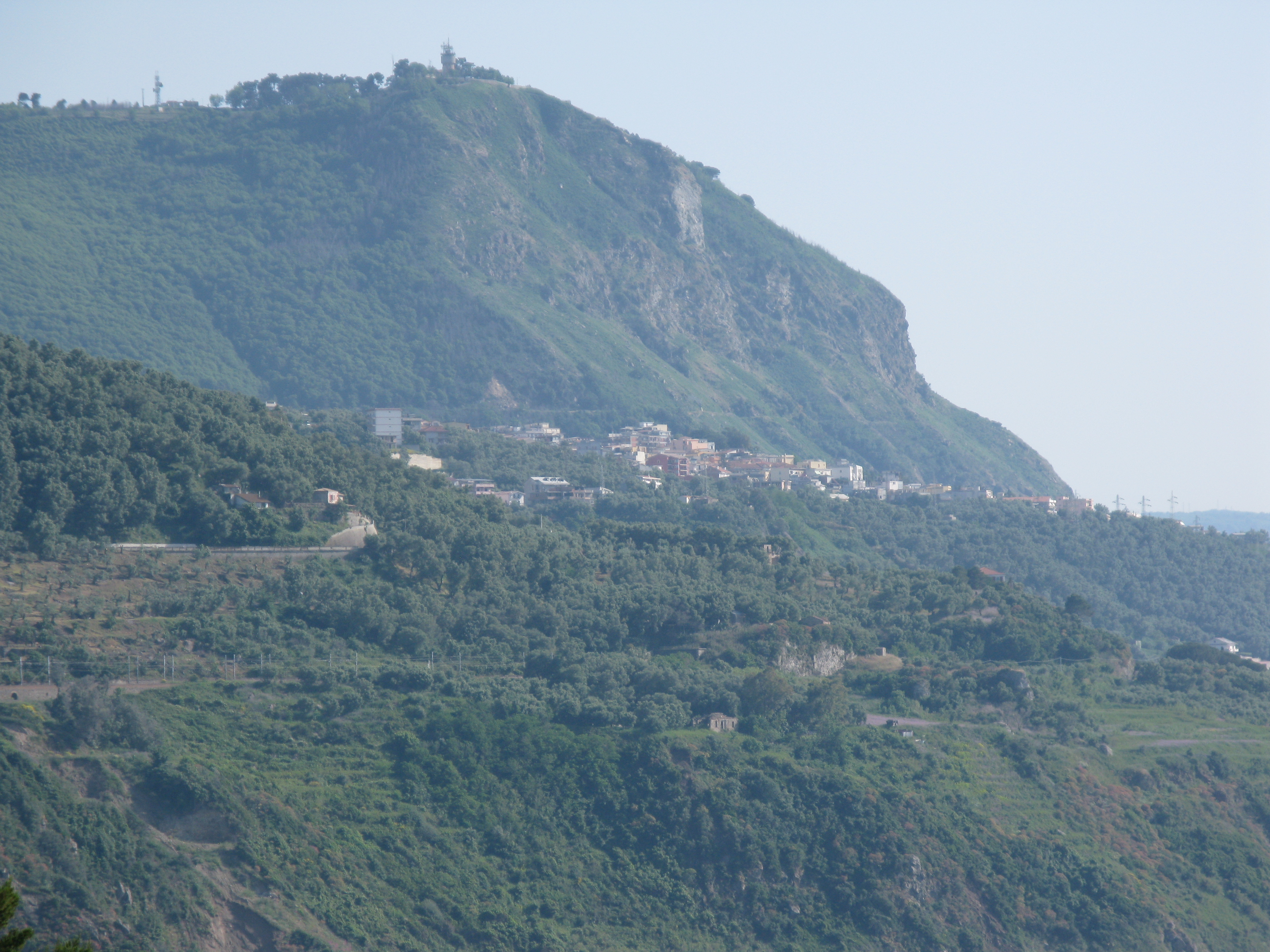
- The mountain, in the background, photographed from Lido di Palmi

Highest point
- Elevation: 582 m (1,909 ft)

Geography
- Location: Palmi, Calabria, Italy
- Parent range: Apennine Mountains

Monte Sant'Elia is an Italian mountain in Palmi, Calabria. It has an elevation of 582 metres (1,909 ft) above sea level.
