= List of people from Central Italy =

This is a list of notable central Italians.

Central Italy comprises four regions: Tuscany, Umbria, Marche, and Lazio, which hosts Rome, the Capital city.

== Architects ==
- Francesco Talenti (c. 1300 – aft. 1369), was an architect. He worked at Orvieto Cathedral in the 1320s, and succeeded Pisano at Florence Cathedral in c. 1343.
- Filippo Brunelleschi (1377–1446), was an architect and polymathic genius, who, among other achievements, was the discoverer of linear perspective.
- Michelozzo (1396–1472), was an architect and sculptor, notable in the development of Florentine Renaissance architecture.
- Bernardo Rossellino (1409–1464), was an architect as well as a sculptor and carried out the building of the Palazzo Rucellai.
- Giuliano da Sangallo (c. 1445 – 1516), an architect, engineer, and sculptor, was active in Florence, Rome, Naples and Milan.
- Baccio Pontelli (c. 1450 – 1492), was an architect and sculptor. Pupil of Francesco di Giorgio.
- Antonio da Sangallo the Elder (c. 1453 – 1534), Renaissance architect among whose works was San Biagio near Montepulciano.
- Baccio D'Agnolo (1462–1543), was a "wood-carver, sculptor, and architect who exerted an important influence on the Renaissance architecture of Florence."
- Antonio da Sangallo the Younger (1484–1546), was "one of the most distinguished architects... in the second quarter of 16th century."
- Jacopo Sansovino (1486–1570), was an architect and sculptor, most famous for his works in Venice's Piazza San Marco, particularly his Biblioteca Marciana.
- Giulio Romano (c. 1499 – 1546), architect, painter and decorator, whose real name was Giulio Pippi. "He was one of the major figures of the late Renaissance."
- Galeazzo Alessi (1512–1572), was an important High Renaissance architect, best known for his work in Genoa and Milan.
- Bernardo Buontalenti (c. 1531 – 1608), architect, engineer, designer, painter, and inventor. He was one of the great Renaissance polymaths.
- Nicola Sabbatini (1574–1654), was an architect and engineer "who pioneered in theatrical perspective techniques."
- Gherardo Silvani (1579–1675), was a Baroque architect of distinction. His main work is the church of San Gaetano in Florence.
- Carlo Rainaldi (1611–1691), was one of the most important architects in Rome during the second half of the 17th century.
- Domenico Martinelli (1650–1718), was an architect and painter. Among his best works is the palace of Prince Lichtenstein at Vienna.
- Alessandro Specchi (1668–1729), "was an able civic designer who, among other works, began the delightful Scala di Spagna, Rome (Spanish Steps)."
- Alessandro Galilei (1691–1737), was one of a number of gifted architects whose work moved away from Baroque towards Neoclassicism.
- Nicola Salvi (1697–1751), was an architect. He is now remembered for his work at the Trevi Fountain, the last great baroque monument in Rome.
- Ferdinando Fuga (1699–1782), was an architect. He is best known for his rebuilding of Santa Maria Maggiore in Rome.
- Giuseppe Piermarini (1734–1808), was "the leading architect in Lombardy during the last quarter of the 18th century."
- Louis Visconti (1791–1853), was an architect active in France. His most significant project was the design for Bonaparte's Tomb.
- Enrico Marconi (January 1792 – 1863), was an architect. From 1822 to his death, he was active in Poland.
- Antonio Corazzi (December 1792 – 1877), was one of the principal authors of the architecture of Warsaw in the first half of the 19th century.
- Marcello Piacentini (1881–1960), was an architect. Son of Pio Piacentini, and principal architect in Rome during the Fascist regime.
- Italo Gismondi (1887–1974), was an architect and archaeologist. He also created the plastic model of ancient Rome displayed in the Museum of Roman Civilization.
- Pietro Belluschi (1899–1994), was an architect, civil engineer, and designer. He won the 1972 AIA Gold Medal.
- Luigi Moretti (1907–1973), was an architect. His most notable work is the Watergate complex in Washington, D.C.
- Pietro Porcinai (1910–1986), was an artist, furniture designer, architect, and landscape architect, who began his career as a garden designer in 1937.
- Massimiliano Fuksas (born 1944), is an architect. Among his works may be cited the Twin Tower, Vienna (1999–01), and the FieraMilano complex, Milan (2002–05).

== Chess players ==
- Serafino Dubois (1817–1899), was the leading Italian chess player for most of the mid 1800s.
- Antonio Sacconi (1895–1968), was a chess player. International Master (1951) and Italian Champion in 1935 and joint Champion in 1937.

== Cinematography ==
- Augusto Genina (1892–1957), was a director and writer, known for Bengasi, The Siege of the Alcazar, and Heaven over the Marshes.
- Mario Camerini (1895–1981), was a director and writer, known for Ulysses, Una romantica avventura, and War and Peace.
- Alessandro Blasetti (1900–1987), was a director and writer, known for The Iron Crown, Prima comunione, and Me, Me, Me... and the Others.
- Aldo Fabrizi (1905–1990), was an actor and director. He is best remembered for his performance in the Rossellini film, Rome, Open City.
- Roberto Rossellini (1906–1977), was the first neorealist film director to rise to international acclaim with the release of Rome, Open City.
- Anna Magnani (1908–1973), was an actress who won an Oscar for her performance in the screen adaptation of Tennessee Williams' The Rose Tattoo.
- Gillo Pontecorvo (1919–2006), was a film director. He is best remembered for The Battle of Algiers, regarded by many critics as a masterpiece.
- Alberto Sordi (1920–2003), was an actor who depicted Italy's virtues and vices in more than 160 movies and contributed to making Italian comedy famous worldwide.
- Carlo Lizzani (April 1922 – 2013), was a director and writer, known for The Hunchback of Rome, Bandits in Milan, and Celluloide.
- Mauro Bolognini (June 1922 – 2001), was a prolific director admired, above all, for his elegant adaptations of literary works, made mostly in the 1960s and 1970s.
- Giuseppe Rotunno (born 1923), cinematographer. He is known for his work on The Adventures of Baron Munchausen, Wolf, and Amarcord.
- Gabriele Ferzetti (born 1925), is an actor, known for Once Upon a Time in the West, L'Avventura, and On Her Majesty's Secret Service.
- Sergio Corbucci (1926–1990), was a director, known for The Great Silence, Navajo Joe, and Gli specialisti.
- Lucio Fulci (1927–1996), also known as The Godfather of Gore, was a film director, screenwriter, and actor.
- Sergio Leone (3 January 1929 – 1989), was one of the most important directors of his generation. He is mostly associated with the Spaghetti Western genre.
- Elio Petri (29 January 1929 – 1982), was a writer and director, known for Investigation of a Citizen Above Suspicion, A Quiet Place in the Country, and The Assassin.
- Silvana Mangano (April 1930 – 1989), was an actress. She is best known for her role in the film Bitter Rice.
- Antonio Margheriti (September 1930 – 2002), was a director and writer, known for Yor, the Hunter from the Future, Cannibal Apocalypse, and Horror Castle.
- Virna Lisi (born 1936), is an actress. In 1994, she won two awards: Cannes Film Festival award and César award.
- Giuliano Gemma (1938–2013), was an actor. A Pistol for Ringo, The Return of Ringo, and Blood for a Silver Dollar are among his greatest successes.
- Osvaldo Desideri (born 1939), is an art director. He won an Oscar for Best Art Direction and Set Decoration (with Cesari and Scarfiotti) for The Last Emperor.
- Vittorio Storaro (born 1940), is a cinematographer who won Oscars for Apocalypse Now, Reds, and The Last Emperor.
- Manlio Rocchetti (born 1943), is a makeup artist. He won an Oscar for Best Makeup (with Lynn Barber and Kevin Haney) for Driving Miss Daisy.
- Isabella Rossellini (June 1952), actress and model. She is probably best known for her role as Dorothy Vallens in the 1986 David Lynch film Blue Velvet.
- Roberto Benigni (October 1952), is an actor, director and producer best known for his 1997 Oscar-winning film Life Is Beautiful.
- Nanni Moretti (Note: Born in Bruneck from Roman parents.) (born 1953), is a director, producer, screenwriter, and actor. Ecce Bombo is generally considered his masterpiece.
- Margherita Buy (born 1962), is an actress, known for The Ignorant Fairies, The Caiman, and Days and Clouds.
- Gabriele Muccino (born 1967), is a director and writer, known for The Pursuit of Happyness, Seven Pounds, and The Last Kiss.
- Matteo Garrone (born 1968), is a writer and director, known for Gomorrah, Reality, and L'imbalsamatore.
- Asia Argento (born 1975), is a director, writer and actress. She is the daughter of the famous horror director Dario Argento.

== Economists ==
- Pellegrino Rossi (1787–1848), was a law expert, economist, diplomat, active in Swiss, French, and Italian politics.
- Franco Modigliani (1918–2003), was an economist. He won the 1985 Nobel Memorial Prize in Economic Sciences for his pioneering work in economic theory.
- Mario Draghi (born 1947), is a banker and economist. In 2013 Forbes nominated Draghi 9th most powerful person in the world.

== Engineers ==
- Felice Matteucci (1808–1887), was a hydraulic engineer, co-inventor with Eugenio Barsanti, of the internal combustion engine.
- Filippo Zappata (1894–1994), was an engineer and one of the most important designers of seaplanes.
- Riccardo Morandi (1902–1989), was a civil engineer. One of his most famous executed projects is the bridge on Lake Maracaibo in Venezuela.

== Engravers ==
- Maso Finiguerra (1426–1464), was a goldsmith, engraver, and draftsman, known for his work in niello, and as "one of the first major Italian printmakers."
- Stefano della Bella (1610–1664), was a printmaker noted for his engravings of military events, in the manner of Jacques Callot.
- Francesco Bartolozzi (1727–1815), was an engraver in the service of George III of the United Kingdom.
- Bartolomeo Pinelli (1771–1835), was a painter and engraver who illustrated the works of Virgil, amongst others and published albums of numerous classical subjects.

== Explorers ==
- Amerigo Vespucci (1454–1512), was an explorer for whom the Americas were named.
- Orazio Antinori (1811–1882), was a zoologist and African explorer, born at Perugia.

== Fashion designers ==
- Guccio Gucci (1881–1953), was a fashion designer and founder of The House of Gucci.
- Roberto Cavalli (born 1940), is a well-known fashion designer of modern luxury clothing.
- Laura Biagiotti (born 1943), is a fashion designer affectionately known as the Queen of Cashmere.

== Fashion models ==
- Monica Bellucci (born 1964), is a model and actress.
- Mariacarla Boscono (born 1980), is a model.
- Ilary Blasi (born 1981), is a showgirl and model.
- Vanessa Hessler (born 1988), is a model and actress.

== Military figures ==
- Castruccio Castracani (1281–1328), was a famous condottiero created duke of Lucca in 1327.
- Niccolò Piccinino (1386–1444), condottiero, was a cavalryman who spent the most important years of his career in the service of Milan.
- Federico da Montefeltro (1422–1482), learned Renaissance prince who was an outstanding military leader and a great patron of the arts.
- Vitellozzo Vitelli (c. 1458 – 1502), was a famous military leader or condottiero from Città di Castello, Umbria.
- Cesare Borgia (1475/76 – 1507), was a Cardinal, military leader, and Machiavellian politician. He was the son of Pope Alexander VI.
- Francesco Ferruccio (1489–1530), was a military commander. He served in the Bande Nere in various parts of Italy, earning a reputation as a daring fighter.
- Alexander Farnese, Duke of Parma (1545–1592), was a famous military commander who served Philip II and became governor-general of the Netherlands.
- Ottavio Piccolomini (1599–1656), was duke of Amalfi and one of the most powerful people in Spain as well as a key player in the Thirty Years' War.
- Pier Ruggero Piccio (1880–1965), a skilled war pilot, distinguished himself in World War I as a daring fighter pilot. He had a total of 24 victories.
- Enrico Toti (1882–1916), was a cyclist, patriot and one of the greatest of Italy's war heroes.
- Franco Lucchini (1917–1943), was a World War II fighter pilot with 26 individual victories and 52 shared.

== Missionaries ==
- Riccoldo da Monte di Croce (c. 1243 – 1320), was a Dominican missionary to the court of the Mongol Il-Khan ruler Arghun.
- Matteo Ricci (1552–1610), was a Jesuit missionary and polymath who opened China to Roman Catholic evangelization.
- Anthony Baldinucci (1665–1717), was a Jesuit missionary, popularized the image as he preached and created missions throughout Italy.
- Teodorico Pedrini (1671–1746), was a priest, missionary, musician and composer in China.
- Ippolito Desideri (1684–1733), was a Jesuit missionary, who visited Tibet in the early 18th century.

== Musicians ==
- Guido of Arezzo (c. 990 – 1050), was a "medieval music theorist whose principles served as a foundation for modern Western musical notation."
- Antonio Squarcialupi (1416–1480), was an organist and composer. He was "the most famous Italian organist of his time."
- Giovanni Animuccia (c. 1520 – 1571), was a composer. "Predecessor of Palestrina as maestro of the Vatican and regarded as extraordinarily fertile innovator."
- Gioseffo Guami (1542–1611), was an organist and composer of motets, madrigals and canzonas representative of the Venetian school.
- Emilio de' Cavalieri (c. 1550 – 1602), was a composer and polymath. He lived mainly at the Florentine court of the Medici, where he was Inspector General of Arts.
- Giulio Caccini (1551–1618), a tenor, composer, and teacher was the most important member of the Camerata.
- Jacopo Peri (1561–1633), was a composer and singer. He is "often known as the 'inventor' of opera."
- Ottavio Rinuccini (1562–1621), was the first opera librettist, having produced the texts for Peri's Dafne and Euridice, as well as Monteverdi's L'Arianna.
- Giovanni Francesco Anerio (c. 1567 – 1630), was an important composer and organist, brother of Felice Anerio.
- Marco da Gagliano (1582–1643), was a celebrated composer. Gagliano's Dafne, to a text by Rinuccini, is a milestone in the early history of opera.
- Gregorio Allegri (c. 1582 – 1652), was maestro di capella for Pope Urban VIII. He was seen as a successor to Palestrina.
- Pietro Della Valle (1586–1652), composer, librettist, and theorist. Della Valle was also "a soldier, world traveler, and a passionate and articulate orientalist."
- Stefano Landi (February 1587 – 1639), was an early Baroque composer whose large output includes operas, madrigals, arias, masses, and other sacred compositions.
- Francesca Caccini (September 1587 – after 1641), known as La Cecchina, was a skilled composer, singer, and instrumentalist who served the Medici court in Florence.
- Antonio Cesti (1623–1669), "composer who, with Francesco Cavalli, was one of the leading Italian composers of the 17th century."
- Jean-Baptiste Lully (1632–1687), was a composer and founder of the French operatic tradition. His name originally was Giovanni Battista Lulli.
- Alessandro Stradella (1639–1682), was one of the major composers of his era, writing some 30 stage works and 200 cantatas.
- Benedetto Pamphili (1653–1730), was a cardinal, a patron of music in Rome and a librettist, especially important during Handel's first year there.
- Giuseppe Ottavio Pitoni (1657–1743), composer and writer on music. He was "one of the best and most prolific composers of sacred music of his time."
- Francesco Manfredini (1684–1762), was an important composer of the Baroque Era. He worked mainly in the cultural orbit of Bologna.
- Francesco Geminiani (1687–1762), was a violinist and composer noted for his concertos and sonatas.
- Domenico Zipoli (1688–1726), was a composer. He is best known for his Sonate d'intavolatura per organo e cimbalo (1716), his only published work.
- Francesco Maria Veracini (1690–1768), was lauded as one of the great violin virtuosi of the late Baroque and is also known as a composer of operas.
- Giovanni Battista Pergolesi (1710–1736), was a famous composer. His intermezzo, La serva padrona, became a model for Italian opera buffa.
- Antonio Sacchini (1730–1786), was a composer active in London from 1772 to 1781. "He was one of the leading 18th-century composers of opera seria."
- Luigi Boccherini (1743–1805), was "one of the great musicians of the classical era – so great that his contemporaries put him on an equal footing with Haydn."
- Giuseppe Cambini (1746–1825), was certainly one of the most prolific composers of the late 18th century, with well over 700 compositions to his name.
- Muzio Clementi (1752–1832), was a musical polymath and child prodigy. In his time, he was known as "the father of the piano."
- Luigi Cherubini (1760–1842), composer and teacher. He was a dominant figure in French musical life for half a century.
- Francesco Morlacchi (1784–1841), was a composer of sacred music and operas, born at Perugia.
- Pietro Raimondi (1786–1853), was a composer and conductor. A pupil of Conservatorio della Pieta, Naples.
- Nicola Vaccai (1790–1848), opera composer. He wrote Giulietta e Romeo in 1825, the libretto of which was adapted by Romani for Bellini's I Capuleti e i Montecchi.
- Gioachino Rossini (1792–1868), was one of the greatest musical geniuses of all time. The Barber of Seville is probably the greatest comic opera ever written.
- Fanny Tacchinardi Persiani (1812–1867), was one of the great sopranos of his age. Studied with her father, the tenor Nicola Tacchinardi.
- Erminia Frezzolini (1818–1884), was a great artist, "considered by many the greatest soprano of the 19th century, Jenny Lind not excepted."
- Marietta Alboni (1823–1894), was a singer, described in Grove's Dictionary as "the most celebrated contralto of the nineteenth century."
- Giovanni Sgambati (1841–1914), was a pianist, composer, and child prodigy. "He was a leading figure in the late 19th-century resurgence of non-operatic music in Italy."
- Alfredo Catalani (1854–1893), composer whose only well known work – La Wally was brought to non-operatic prominence through the hugely successful French thriller Diva.
- Alessandro Moreschi (November 1858 – 1922), was a castrato singer. Known as "the angel of Rome" because of vocal purity.
- Giacomo Puccini (December 1858 – 1924), was an opera composer. He ranks as one of the greatest opera composers of all time.
- Pietro Mascagni (1863–1945), was an operatic composer. He is known for his opera Cavalleria rusticana, based on the tale by Giovanni Verga.
- Ferruccio Busoni (1866–1924), was a pianist, composer, and polymath who attained fame as a pianist of brilliance and intellectual power.
- Luisa Tetrazzini (1871–1940), was "the most famous coloratura soprano of her day." She made many concert tours, appearing in London for the last time in 1934.
- Giuseppe De Luca (1876–1950), was an operatic baritone. His debut was at Piacenza in 1897, singing Valentin in Gounod's Faust.
- Titta Ruffo (1877–1953), was a baritone, most famous for his role of Figaro in Rossini's opera The Barber of Seville.
- Vittorio Gui (1885–1975), was a conductor and composer. He founded the Orchestra Stabile (1928), which led to the creation of the Maggio Musicale Fiorentino.
- Ezio Pinza (1892–1957), was a singer. "In many respects the finest lyric bass of the twentieth century, and one of the most popular singers in history."
- Mario Castelnuovo-Tedesco (1895–1968), "was one of the most prolific Italian composers of the first half of the twentieth century."
- Mario Del Monaco (1915–1982), was a leading dramatic tenor for Italian operas in the 1940s and 1950s, most famous for Otello.
- Franco Corelli (1921–2003), was a celebrated tenor. His strong, dark voice has made him a favourite in such roles as Don José, Radamès and Calaf.
- Renata Tebaldi (1922–2004), was one of the greatest opera singers of all time – Arturo Toscanini, hard to please, said she had the "voice of an angel."
- Riz Ortolani (1926–2014), was a film composer. His best known piece is probably More, the theme tune from Mondo cane, which was Oscar nominated for Best Song.
- Ennio Morricone (1928–2020), was a composer, one of the most prolific film composers of all time. In 2007 Morricone won an Oscar for Lifetime Achievement after five previous nominations.
- Sylvano Bussotti (born 1931), is a polymath of his age: composer, successful painter, set designer, stage, film, and opera director.
- Riccardo Fogli (born 1947), is a singer. He was a winner in 1982 at Festival di Sanremo with Storie di tutti i giorni.
- Francesco De Gregori (born 1951), commonly known in his native country as Il principe poeta (The Poet Prince), is a famous singer-songwriter.
- Ryan Paris (born 1953), original name Fabio Roscioli, is a singer. His biggest success was the world-famous song Dolce Vita.
- Dario Marianelli (June 1963), is a composer of piano, orchestral, and film music. He won both an Oscar and a Golden Globe for Atonement in 2008.
- Eros Ramazzotti (October 1963), is a singer-songwriter. "An international superstar whose appeal spans not only Western Europe but also Latin America."
- Jovanotti (born 1966), original name Lorenzo Cherubini, is a singer-songwriter and rapper.
- Tiziano Ferro (born 1980), is a famous pop singer. He remains best known for his European hit Perdono and his Latin American hit Sere nere.

== Painters ==
- Pietro Cavallini (1259 – c. 1330), painter and mosaicist. He was a member of the ancient Roman family of the Cerroni.
- Francesco Traini (fl. 1321 – 1345), painter and illuminator. "He was the most accomplished Pisan artist in the second quarter of the 14th century."
- Filippo Lippi (c. 1406 – 1469), was a leading painter of the Renaissance. He painted religious subjects on altarpieces and in frescoes in various towns in Italy.
- Antonio del Pollaiuolo (1429/33 – 1498), was a painter, sculptor, goldsmith, and engraver. Representative of the Florentine school of the late quattrocento.
- Niccolò Alunno (1430–1502), was a painter of the Umbrian School, who was also active in The Marches.
- Antoniazzo Romano (c. 1430 – c. 1510), was the most important local painter in Rome during the period when the city reemerged as a major power in Italy.
- Luca Signorelli (c. 1445 – 1523), was one of the great painters during the Renaissance. His masterpiece is the fresco cycle in Orvieto Cathedral.
- Sandro Botticelli (c. 1445 – 1510), creator of The Birth of Venus and Primavera, was one of the greatest painters of the Renaissance.
- Pinturicchio (1454–1513), original name Bernardino di Betto, was a painter of the Umbrian school known for his frescoes in the Collegiate Church at Spello.
- Filippino Lippi (c. 1457 – 1504), Renaissance painter of the Florentine school, who was the son of Filippo Lippi and the pupil of Botticelli.
- Fra Bartolomeo (1472–1517), painter who was "a prominent exponent in early 16th-century Florence of the High Renaissance style."
- Pontormo (1494–1557), "was the leading painter in mid-16th-century Florence and one of the most original and extraordinary of Mannerist artists."
- Giorgio Vasari (1511–1574), was a painter and polymath from Arezzo. Author of The Lives of the Most Excellent Painters, Sculptors, and Architects.
- Giovanni Baglione (1566–1643), was a painter, draughtsman and writer. He executed canvases and frescoes of religious and mythological subjects, and portraits.
- Giuseppe Cesari (1568–1640), was a celebrated historical painter, sometimes called il Cavaliere d'Arpino.
- Domenico Fetti (c. 1589 – 1623), was a painter. "His most characteristic works are of religious themes turned into scenes of everyday contemporary life."
- Artemisia Gentileschi (1593 – c. 1656), was a painter. She specialized in paintings of strong heroines, especially from the Bible.
- Pietro da Cortona (1596/7 – 1669), painter and architect, was one of the leading protagonists of the exuberant, high Baroque style.
- Giovanna Garzoni (1600–1670), was a painter, best known for her studies of flowers, plants, and animals.
- Francesco Furini (1603–1646), "was one of the leading Florentine painters of the first half of the 17th century."
- Filippo Baldinucci (1624–1697), was a painter, art historian, and biographer. He wrote "the first dictionary of art terminology."
- Carlo Maratta (1625–1713), was a leading painter of the Roman school under the influence of the counter-reformation.
- Pompeo Batoni (1708–1787), was "the preeminent painter of 18th century Rome and in the 1780s probably the most famous artist in Europe."
- Marcello Bacciarelli (1731–1818), court painter to King Stanisław August Poniatowski, was one of the most prolific artists in Warsaw during the late 18th century.
- Vincenzo Camuccini (1771–1844), was a painter. Among his best-known works are Death of Caesar and Death of Virginia.
- Francesco Podesti (1800–1895), was a painter and Member of the Accademia di San Luca.
- Constantino Brumidi (1805–1880), painter whose lifework was the painting of portraits and frescoes for the Capitol in Washington, D.C.
- Giovanni Fattori (1825–1908), perhaps the best of the Macchiaioli, was fond of battle scenes and landscapes populated by long-horned white cattle.
- Telemaco Signorini (1835–1901), painter and graphic artist. He was a leader of the Macchiaioli.
- Amedeo Modigliani (1884–1920), was an important painter of the early 1900s. His favorite subject was the single figure.
- Alberto Burri (1915–1995), was a painter, collagist and designer, born at Città di Castello in Umbria.

== Political figures ==
- Marozia (c. 890 – 982), was a noblewoman famous for her family's influence on the papacy. She is presumably the basis for the legend of a female Pope Joan.
- Ugolino della Gherardesca (c. 1220 – 1289), count of Donoratico, was a prominent player in Pisan and Tuscan politics in the 13th century.
- Cola di Rienzo (c. 1313 – 1354), original name Nicola Di Lorenzo, was a famous political leader who tried to restore the greatness of ancient Rome.
- Lorenzo de' Medici (1449–1492), also known as Lorenzo the Magnificent, was a leading statesman of the Renaissance.
- Lucrezia Borgia (1480–1519), was a powerful noblewoman who made three political marriages and is popularly regarded as a femme fatale.
- Filippo Strozzi the Younger (1489–1538), was a member of one of Florence's noblest families and one of the richest men of his time.
- Catherine de' Medici (1519–1589), was a Machiavellian politician, wife of Henry II of France.
- Ercole Consalvi (1757–1824), was appointed cardinal secretary of state by Pope Pius VII a first time in 1800 and a second time in 1814.
- Terenzio, Count Mamiani della Rovere (1799–1885), was a statesman and writer, who worked for Italian unification.
- Sidney Sonnino (1847–1922), was a conservative leader, foreign minister during World War I, and Italian representative at the Paris Peace Conference.
- Giovanni Gronchi (1887–1978), was a Christian Democrat politician who served as president of Italy from 1955 to 1962.
- Carlo Rosselli (1899–1937), was a politician, economist, and strong opponent of fascism.
- Altiero Spinelli (1907–1986), was a politician, journalist, and founder, in 1943, of the European Federalist Movement.
- Giulio Andreotti (1919–2013), also known as Divine Julius, was the ultimate insider of Italian political life. For half a century he was at the heart of power.
- Carlo Azeglio Ciampi (born 1920), is a politician and banker who has been both Prime Minister of Italy and President of the Italian Republic.
- Franco Frattini (born 1957), is a politician. Former Italian Minister of Foreign Affairs and former European Commissioner.

=== Popes ===
- Pope John XIII (c. 930/35 – 972), original name Giovanni dei Crescenzi, was pope from 965 to 972.
- Pope John XIX (... – 1032), original name Romano dei Conti di Tuscolo, was pope from 1024 to 1032.
- Pope Innocent II (... – 1143), original name Gregorio Papareschi, was pope from 1130 to 1143.
- Pope Eugene III (... – 1153), original name Bernardo da Pisa, was pope from 1145 to 1153.
- Pope Anastasius IV (c. 1073 – 1154), original name Corrado Di Suburra, was pope from July 1153 to December 1154.
- Pope Lucius III (c. 1100 – 1185), original name Ubaldo Allucingoli, was pope from 1181 to 1185.
- Pope Celestine II (1100/05 – 1144), original name Guido di Castello, was pope from 1143 to 1144.
- Pope Honorius III (1148–1227), original name Cencio Savelli, was pope from 1216 to 1227.
- Pope Innocent III (1160/61 – 1216), original name Lotario dei Conti di Segni, was pope from 1198 to 1216.
- Pope Gregory IX (before 1170 – 1241), original name Ugolino di Conti, was pope from 1227 to 1241.
- Pope Alexander IV (1199–1261), original name Rinaldo Conti, Count of Segni, was pope from 1254 to 1261.
- Pope Honorius IV (c. 1210 – 1287), original name Giacomo Savelli, was pope from 1285 to 1287.
- Pope Nicholas III (c. 1225 – 1280), original name Giovanni Gaetano Orsini, was pope from 1277 to 1280.
- Pope Nicholas IV (1227–1292), original name Girolamo Masci, was pope from 1288 to 1292.
- Pope Boniface VIII (c. 1235 – 1303), original name Benedetto Caetani, was pope from 1294 to 1303.
- Pope Martin V (1369–1431), original name Otto or Oddone Colonna, was pope from 1417 to 1431.
- Pope Leo X (1475–1521), original name Giovanni de' Medici, was pope from 1513 to 1521.
- Pope Clement VII (1478–1534), original name Giulio di Giuliano de' Medici, was pope from 1523 to 1534.
- Pope Julius III (1487–1555), original name Giovanni Maria Ciocchi del Monte, was pope from 1550 to 1555.
- Pope Leo XI (1535–1605), original name Alessandro Ottaviano de' Medici, was pope from 1–27 April 1605.
- Pope Clement VIII (1536–1605), original name Ippolito Aldobrandini, was pope from 1592 to 1605.
- Pope Paul V (1552–1621), original name Camillo Borghese, was pope from 1605 to 1621.
- Pope Urban VIII (1568–1644), original name Maffeo Barberini, was pope from 1623 to 1644.
- Pope Innocent X (1574–1655), original name Giovanni Battista Pamphilj, was pope from September 1644 to January 1655.
- Pope Clement X (1590–1676), original name Emilio Bonaventura Altieri, was pope from 1670 to 1676.
- Pope Clement IX (1600–1669), original name Giulio Rospigliosi, was pope from 1667 to 1669.
- Pope Clement XII (1652–1740), original name Lorenzo Corsini, was pope from 1730 to 1740.
- Pope Pius XII (1876–1958), original name Eugenio Maria Giuseppe Giovanni Pacelli, was pope from 1939 to 1958.

== Printers ==
- Pietro Perna (1519–1582), was one of the most important printers of Basel.

== Saints ==
- John Gualbert (985 or 995 – 1073), was a Christian monk, reformer, and founder of the Vallumbrosan Order.
- Bona of Pisa (c. 1156 – 1207), was a nun. She is the patroness saint of travellers, flight attendants, and Pisa.
- Francis of Assisi (1181/2 – 1226), original name Giovanni di Pietro di Bernardone, was the founder of the Franciscans.
- Clare of Assisi (1194–1253), original name Chiara Offreduccio, was an abbess and founder of the Poor Clares.
- Agnes of Assisi (1197/8 – 1253), was an abbess and miracle worker, the younger sister of Saint Clare of Assisi.
- Philip Benizi de Damiani (1233–1285), also known as St Philip Benitius, was a general superior of the Order of the Servites.
- Angela of Foligno (1248–1309), was a mystic born in Foligno, Umbria, author of The Book of the Experiences of the Truly Faithful.
- Juliana Falconieri (1270–1341), was the foundress of the Servite Nuns, called the Mantellates.
- Andrew Corsini (1302–1373), was a Carmelite bishop of Fiesole, who had been canonized in 1629.
- Frances of Rome (1384–1440), was a mystic. In 1425 she founded the Oblates of Mary, who were later called the Oblates of Tor de' Specchi.
- Philip Neri (1515–1595), was a priest, founder of the Congregation of the Oratory (Oratorians).
- Catherine of Ricci (1522–1590), original name Alessandra Lucrezia Romola de' Ricci, was a Dominican mystic and stigmatist.
- Magdalena de Pazzi (1566–1607), was a Carmelite nun known for her austerity and her ecstatic visions during which she exhibited the stigmata.
- Vincent Strambi (1745–1824), was a member of the Passionist Order, Bishop of Macerata and Tolentino.
- Teresa Margaret of the Sacred Heart (1747–1770), original name Anna Maria Redi, was a Discalced Carmelite nun and mystic.
- Gaspar del Bufalo (1786–1837), was a priest who founded the Missionaries of the Precious Blood in 1815.
- Vincent Pallotti (1795–1850), was a priest and founder of the Society of the Catholic Apostolate.
- Gabriel of Our Lady of Sorrows (1838–1862), original name Francesco Possenti, was a Passionist clerical student.

== Scientists ==
- Paolo dal Pozzo Toscanelli (1397–1482), was a physician, mapmaker, and astrologer who suggested to Christopher Columbus that he could reach Asia by sailing westward.
- Vidus Vidius (1509–1569), was a surgeon and anatomist. Vidus' name is associated with several anatomical structures: the Vidian nerve and Vidian artery.
- Hippolito Salviani (1514–1572), was a physician, scholar, and naturalist. His magnificent Aquatilium animalium historiae was first printed in 1554.
- Andrea Cesalpino (1519–1603), an anatomist and botanist, was the first to develop a model of blood circulation (of the inner circle) and a classification of plants and minerals.
- Castore Durante (1529–1590), was a physician, botanist, and poet. In his Herbario Nuovo (1585) he combined his talents and wrote the plant descriptions in verse.
- Michele Mercati (1541–1593), physician to Pope Clement VII in Rome and supervisor of the Vatican botanic gardens, was also interested in geography, geology, and chorology.
- Galileo Galilei (1564–1642), a physicist and polymathic genius, has been called the "father of modern science."
- Federico Cesi (1585–1630), was a scientist, naturalist, and founder of the Accademia dei Lincei.
- Francesco Redi (1626–1697), was a biologist and poet who in 1668 succeeded to experimentally refute the hypothesis of spontaneous generation.
- Pietro Rossi (1738–1804), was an academic, naturalist, and author. First Professor of Entomology (University of Pisa, 1801–1804).
- Paolo Mascagni (1755–1815), was a famous anatomist and professor at the universities of Pisa and Florence.
- Vincenzo Chiarugi (1759–1820), was a physician, author of the first Italian treatise on psychiatry, Della pazzia in genere e in specie (1793).
- Giuseppe Raddi (1770–1829), was a cryptogamist, traveler, explorer, plant collector (Brazil, Madeira, and Egypt), mycologist. He wrote Synopsis filicum brasiliensium (1819).
- Paolo Savi (1798–1871), was a geologist, ornithologist, and professor of natural history at the University of Pisa.
- Filippo Civinini (1805–1844), was an anatomist. In 1835 Civinini provided the first description of plantar neuroma, known today as Morton's metatarsalgia.
- Antonio Meucci (1808–1889), was a scientist and inventor. In almost every major reference publication in Italy, Meucci is recognized as the inventor of the telephone.
- Filippo Pacini (1812–1883), a physician who was "particularly skilled in microscopy, observed the comma-shaped bacillus that causes cholera. He called it a vibrio."
- Giovanni Arcangeli (1840–1921), was a botanist. The plant genus Arcangelisia from the family Menispermaceae is named in his honor.
- Antonio Pacinotti (1841–1912), was a physicist and electrical engineer. In 1858 Pacinotti built the first dynamo and in 1860 the first direct current electric engine.
- Odoardo Beccari (1843–1920), was an eminent botanist. Beccari discovered one of the most amazing plants, which the evolution brought out: Amorphophallus titanum.
- Leonardo Gigli (1863–1908), was a surgeon and gynecologist who, in 1894, invented the flexible wire saw named for him for the performance of pubiotomy.
- Ruggero Oddi (1864–1913), was a physiologist and anatomist. The sphincter of Oddi in the major duodenal papilla is named after him.
- Adelchi Negri (1876–1912), professor at Pavia, discovered in 1903 the Negri bodies in the brain of rabid animals, a discovery of great value in the diagnosis of rabies.
- Bruno Pontecorvo (1913–1993), scientist and university professor. He was formed as a physicist in the famous school of Enrico Fermi at the University of Rome.
- Margherita Hack (1922–2013), also known as Lady of the Stars, was an astrophysicist and popular science writer.
- Bruno Zumino (born 1923), is a theoretical physicist noted as the co-inventor of the Wess–Zumino model and Wess–Zumino–Witten model in the field of supersymmetry.
- Paolo Maffei (1926–2009), was a professional astronomer who has discovered two galaxies. These soon became known as Maffei 1 and 2.
- Giovanni Jona-Lasinio (born 1932), is a physicist, famous for having constructed "the first model in elementary particle physics with spontaneous symmetry breaking."
- Nicola Cabibbo (1935–2010), was a physicist. His legacy in particle physics is recorded in the Cabibbo–Kobayashi–Maskawa matrix and the Cabibbo angle.
- Franco Pacini (1939–2012), was an astrophysicist, member of the ESO council and director of the Arcetri Observatory in Florence.
- Giorgio Parisi (born 1948), is a physicist. In theoretical particle physics his name is mostly associated to the famous DGLAP equations.
- Federico Capasso (born 1949), is a physicist. He was one of the inventors of the quantum cascade laser.

=== Mathematicians ===
- Fibonacci (c. 1170 – c. 1250), also known as Leonardo of Pisa, was the most distinguished mathematician of the Middle Ages.
- Ostilio Ricci (1540–1603), was a mathematician and a professor at the Accademia delle Arti del Disegno in Florence.
- Guidobaldo del Monte (1545–1607), was a mathematician, engineer, wealthy aristocrat, and Galileo's patron.
- Vincenzo Viviani (1622–1703), was one of the mathematicians who succeeded in determining the tangent to the cycloid.
- Vittorio Fossombroni (1754–1844), was a celebrated mathematician, statesman, and famous expert in hydraulics.
- Guglielmo Libri Carucci dalla Sommaja (1803–1869), was a mathematician who worked on mathematical physics, particularly the theory of heat.
- Baldassarre Boncompagni (1821–1894), was "a writer and scholar on the history of mathematics who accumulated a vast library of over 40,000 works."
- Enrico Betti (1823–1892), was a mathematician. He developed the Betti numbers, which extend the Euler characteristic to higher-dimensional shapes.
- Francesco Siacci (1839–1907), was a mathematician and ballistician. He is best known for his contributions to the field of exterior ballistics.
- Ulisse Dini (1845–1918), mathematician whose most important work was on the theory of functions of real variables.
- Giovanni Frattini (1852–1925), was a mathematician. He is known for the famous Frattini subgroup.
- Vito Volterra (1860–1940), was a mathematician whose most important work was in the area of integral (whole–number) equations.
- Federigo Enriques (1871–1946), is known among mathematicians for his contributions to the theory of algebraic surfaces and, in particular, to their classification.
- Carlo Severini (1872–1951), was a mathematician. Severini, independently from Dmitri Egorov, proved and published earlier the theorem now known as Egorov's theorem.
- Francesco Severi (1879–1961), one of Italy's most renowned mathematicians, was born in Arezzo.
- Antonio Signorini (1888–1963), was a mathematical physicist and civil engineer. He is known for his work in finite elasticity and for formulating the Signorini problem.
- Enzo Martinelli (1911–1999), was a mathematician who co-discovering the Bochner–Martinelli formula.
- Aldo Andreotti (1924–1980), was a mathematician who proved the Andreotti–Frankel theorem and the Andreotti–Grauert theorem and the Andreotti–Vesentini theorem.

== Sculptors ==
- Guglielmo Agnelli (c. 1238 – 1313), was a sculptor and architect, pupil of Nicola Pisano.
- Giovanni Pisano (c. 1250 – c. 1315), was a sculptor, sometimes called "the only true Gothic sculptor in Italy."
- Lorenzo Ghiberti (1378–1455), was a sculptor and goldsmith; a major transitional figure between the late Gothic and Renaissance worlds.
- Nanni di Banco (c. 1384 – 1421), was an influential sculptor whose masterpiece is the marble Four Crowned Martyrs.
- Donatello (c. 1386 – 1466), was a great sculptor. His bronze David from the 1430s shows the influence of classical Greek sculpture on his own style.
- Luca della Robbia (1399/1400 – 1482), uncle of Andrea della Robbia, was the first major Renaissance artist to use ceramics for sculpture.
- Agostino di Duccio (1418 – c. 1481), was a sculptor, noted for his carved marble panels in the interior of the Tempio Malatestiano at Rimini.
- Antonio Rossellino (1427–1479), was a sculptor, brother of the architect Bernardo.
- Andrea della Robbia (1435–1525), nephew of Luca della Robbia, was a ceramic artist and sculptor.
- Matteo Civitali (1436–1502), sculptor, medalist, and architect, an associate of Antonio Rossellino, at whose studio in Florence he was trained.
- Benedetto da Maiano (1442–1497), was a leading Florentine sculptor and architect of the early Renaissance.
- Andrea Ferrucci (1465–1526), known also as Andrea di Piero Ferruzzi, was a sculptor who was born in Fiesole.
- Pietro Torrigiano (1472–1528), was a sculptor who worked in England, notably on the tomb of Henry VII.
- Benedetto Grazzini (1474 – c. 1552), known also as Benedetto da Rovezzano, was a sculptor and architect from Pistoia.
- Giovanni Francesco Rustici (1475–1554), was a sculptor and painter of the Renaissance.
- Lorenzetto (1490–1541), original name Lorenzo Lotti, was a sculptor and architect from Florence.
- Bartolommeo Bandinelli (1493–1560), was a Renaissance sculptor. Hercules and Cacus is generally considered his masterpiece.
- Benvenuto Cellini (1500–1571), was a famous goldsmith and sculptor. He was also the author of the celebrated Autobiography.
- Giovanni Angelo Montorsoli (c. 1506 – 1563), was a celebrated sculptor and architect from Florence, a pupil of Michelangelo.
- Vincenzo Danti (1530–1576), "sculptor, architect, and writer, active for most of his short career in Florence, where he was based from 1557 to 1573."
- Taddeo Landini (c. 1561 – 1596), was a sculptor and architect, best known as author of the Fontana delle Tartarughe in Rome.
- Pietro Tacca (1577–1640), was a pupil of Giambologna, who later became the official sculptor to the Medici.
- Giuliano Finelli (1601–1653), was a sculptor of the Baroque period, pupil of Bernini.
- Domenico Guidi (1625–1701), was a sculptor, nephew and pupil of Finelli.
- Giovanni Battista Foggini (1652–1725), was among the foremost sculptors of the late Baroque period in Tuscany.
- Giovanni Baratta (1670–1747), was a distinguished sculptor of the Florentine late Baroque.
- Pietro Bracci (1700–1773), was "the most prolific sculptor in eighteenth-century Rome," a pupil of Camillo Rusconi.
- Giuseppe Ceracchi (1751–1801), was an influential sculptor. According to Thomas Jefferson, he was "unquestionably an artist of the first class."
- Clemente Susini (1754–1814), was a sculptor who became famous for his anatomical wax models of the human body.
- Marino Marini (1901–1980), was a sculptor. He is best known for his many vigorous sculptures of horses and horsemen.

== Writers and philosophers ==
- Brunetto Latini (c. 1220 – 1294), was a writer, author of a prose encyclopedia in French, Li Livres dou Trésor and of Tesoretto, a didactic poem in a popular style in Italian.
- Giles of Rome (c. 1243 – 1316), philosopher, theologian, and Augustinian Hermit. He was a member of the influential Colonna family.
- Dino Compagni (c. 1255 – 1324), was a public official and historian, author of a valuable history of Florence Cronica delle cose occorrenti ne' tempi suoi (published 1726).
- Dante Alighieri (c. 1265 – 1321), was an author and polymathic genius. Many scholars consider The Divine Comedy a summary of medieval thought.
- Cino da Pistoia (1270 – 1336/37), a poet and jurist, whose full name was Guittoncino dei Sinibaldi.
- Giovanni Villani (c. 1276 or 1280 – 1348), was a historian, official and diplomat, and author of the Nuova Cronica.
- Petrarch (1304–1374), was a great lyric poet and scholar. He wrote more than 400 poems in Italian. Of these, 366 form his Canzoniere, on which his reputation rests.
- Franco Sacchetti (c. 1335 – c. 1400), was a writer and statesman who is best known for his collection of stories, the Trecentonovelle.
- Leonardo Bruni (c. 1370 – 1444), was a humanist, historian and philosopher, known for his work Historiarum Florentini populi libri XII (1415).
- Giannozzo Manetti (1396–1459), scholar, statesman, writer, and translator. He was "one of the more considerable personalities of the age."
- Matteo Palmieri (1406–1475), was a humanist and historian who is best known for his work Della vita civile ("On Civic Life").
- Luigi Pulci (1432–1484), was a poet, author of the burlesque epic in Tuscan dialect Morgante or Morgante Maggiore.
- Niccolò Machiavelli (1469–1527), was a writer and polymathic genius whom many people consider the father of modern political science.
- Francesco Guicciardini (1483–1540), was a statesman, diplomat and historian, author of History of Italy (completed in 1540, published 1561–1564).
- Pietro Aretino (1492–1556), was a poet, prose writer, and dramatist. His masterpiece Orazia (1546) was perhaps the best Italian tragedy of the 16th century.
- Agnolo Firenzuola (1493–1543), was a writer and poet, known for his work I ragionamenti d'amore (Tales of Firenzuola, 1548).
- Luigi Alamanni (1495–1556), was a poet and statesman. He wrote plays and lively letters to his friends and introduced the epigram into modern Italian poetry.
- Piero Vettori (1499–1585), also known as Pietro Vittorio, was a writer, philologist, and scholar.
- Benedetto Varchi (1502/3 – 1565), was a scholar and critic, best known for his 16-volume history of Florence.
- Giovanni della Casa (1503–1556), was an ecclesiastical careerist, writer and poet, known for his work Il Galateo.
- Girolamo Mei (1519–1594), was a humanist, editor of Greek texts, and historian of Greek music.
- Cesare Ripa (c. 1560 – c. 1645), was a writer and illustrator. Author of Iconologia (1593), an influential and often reprinted handbook of emblems for artists.
- Lorenzo Magalotti (1637–1712), was a "philosopher, scientist, author, diplomat, and poet."
- Giovanni Mario Crescimbeni (1663–1728), priest, poet, and critic, was a founder-member of the Accademia degli Arcadi.
- Metastasio (1698–1782), writer and musical genius. He was probably the single most influential figure in the history of eighteenth-century opera.
- Giuseppe Gioachino Belli (1791–1863), was a great poet and profound thinker. His poetic production "consists of about 2,000 sonnets written in the Roman dialect."
- Giacomo Leopardi (1798–1837), was a poet. This tormented genius is revealed in his work to have been a precursor of modern existentialist thought.
- Francesco Domenico Guerrazzi (1804–1873), was a writer – storyteller, essayist, dramatist, and polemicist – as well as a patriot.
- Carlo Collodi (1826–1890), an author, wrote the famous children's story The Adventures of Pinocchio.
- Giosuè Carducci (1835–1907), a poet, scholar, and literary critic, won the 1906 Nobel Prize for literature.
- Rafael Sabatini (1875–1950), was a writer of novels of romance and adventure. He remains best known for The Sea Hawk, Captain Blood, and Scaramouche.
- Giovanni Papini (1881–1956), was a well-known writer, poet, critic, and a pioneer of the modern literary form of fiction as "fact."
- Aldo Palazzeschi (1885–1974), original name Aldo Giurlani, was a poet and novelist from Florence.
- Sandro Penna (1906–1977), was a poet of great charm, whose main theme is his homosexuality, which he makes no attempt to disguise.
- Alberto Moravia (1907–1990), was one of the greatest novelists and short-story writers of the 1900s. Moravia wrote more than 30 books.
- Eugenio Garin (1909–2004), a leading historian of Italian philosophy, had a powerful imprint on the many scholars who studied with him.
- Fosco Maraini (1912–2004), was a writer and polymath whose book Secret Tibet was the first modern account of the remote Himalayan kingdom on "the roof of the world."
- Vasco Pratolini (1913–1991), was a neorealist writer whose novels had a strong local setting.
- Carlo Cassola (1917–1987), was a novelist and short-story writer. In 1960 Cassola won the Strega Prize for La ragazza di Bube (Bebo's Girl; film, 1964).
- Luciano Bianciardi (1922–1971), was a writer. During his lifetime, he distinguished himself as a novelist, journalist, prolific translator, and pamphleteer.
- Oriana Fallaci (1929–2006), was a journalist, writer, and former war correspondent best known for her abrasive interviews and provocative stances.
- Dacia Maraini (born 1936), is a famous novelist, dramatist, poet, children's writer, and leading feminist commentator.
- Tiziano Terzani (1938–2004), was a journalist and writer who mourned the corruption of Asia by the materialistic west.
- Giorgio Agamben (born 1942), is a philosopher best known for his concept of homo sacer.
- Antonio Tabucchi (1943–2012), was a writer and academic with a deep love of the culture and language of Portugal.
- Andrea Riccardi (born 1950), is a Catholic historian. In 1968 in Rome, he founded the Community of Sant'Egidio.

== Other notables ==
- Beatrice Portinari (1266–1290), of Florence, believed to be Beatrice of the Divine Comedy and Vita nuova, was Dante's lifelong inspiration.
- Baldus de Ubaldis (1327–1400), was a famous medieval jurist who taught law at Pisa, Perugia, and Padua.
- Francesco di Marco Datini (c. 1335 – 1410), was a wool merchant and banker of Prato in Tuscany.
- Lisa del Giocondo (1479–1542), also known as Lisa Gherardini, was the subject of the Mona Lisa, painted by Leonardo da Vinci.
- Peter Martyr Vermigli (1499–1562), was "one of the most influential theologians of the era, held in common regard with such figures as Martin Luther and John Calvin."
- Ignazio Danti (1536–1586), a versatile Dominican friar who was a mathematician, astronomer, mapmaker, artist, and university professor.
- Giacomo Torelli (1608–1678), was a "stage designer and engineer whose innovative theatre machinery provided the basis for many modern stage devices."
- Decio Azzolino (1623–1689), was a Cardinal. Head of the Sacro Collegio faction, known as the Squadrone Volante.
- Antonio Magliabechi (1633–1714), was a librarian for the Medici grand dukes, polymath, and passionate book collector.
- Philippe Buonarroti (1761–1837), was a disciple of Babeuf, prominent figure in French Revolution of 1789.
- Leonetto Cappiello (1875–1942), was one of the most prolific poster artists during both the Art Nouveau and Art Deco periods in Paris.
- Luisa Spagnoli (1877–1935), was a businesswoman. She is especially known for the invention of Bacio Perugina and her fashion house.
- Ferdinando Innocenti (1891–1966), businessman. He was the founder of the Innocenti company and was the creator of the Lambretta motorscooter.
- Luigi Serafini (born 1949), is an artist. He is famous for his works unusual and vague, such as the Codex Seraphinianus.
- Umberto Guidoni (born 1954), is an astronaut and a veteran of two NASA Space Shuttle missions.
- Augusto Odone, (1933-2013) inventor of Lorenzo's oil, a treatment for Adrenoleukodystrophy.

== See also ==
- List of southern Italians
