= List of people from Southern Italy =

This is a list of notable southern Italians.

Southern Italy or Mezzogiorno comprises eight regions: Abruzzo, Molise, Apulia, Campania, Basilicata, Calabria, Sicily, and Sardinia. (Note: Some would also include the most southern parts of Lazio (Sora, Roccasecca, Fondi, Pico, Cassino and Gaeta districts), which historically were part of the Kingdom of Two Sicilies.)

== Architects ==
- Pirro Ligorio (c. 1510 – 1583), was a famous architect of the late Italian Renaissance.
- Giacomo del Duca (c. 1520 – 1604), architect, sculptor, garden designer and assistant to Michelangelo.
- Filippo Juvarra (1678–1736), architect of the late baroque and early rococo periods.
- Filippo Raguzzini (1690–1771), was an architect. A master of Roman Rococo.
- Rosario Gagliardi (1698–1762), was one of the leading architects working in the Sicilian Baroque.
- Luigi Vanvitelli (1700–1773), "architect whose enormous Royal Palace at Caserta was one of the last triumphs of the Italian Baroque."
- Giovanni Battista Vaccarini (1702–1768), "leading architect of the Sicilian Baroque."
- Antonio Rinaldi (с. 1709 – 1794), was an architect who taught and worked in St. Petersburg.
- Vincenzo Sinatra (1720–1765), "worked as a stone cutter, a capomaestro, a tax estimator, and an architect in the city of Noto in southeastern Sicily."
- Carlo Rossi (1775–1849), architect, was one of the last great exponents of Neoclassicism in Saint Petersburg.
- Ernesto Basile (1857–1932), was an architect, teacher and designer, son of Giovan Battista Filippo Basile.
- Simon Rodia (1879–1965), was an architect. His most famous creation are the Watts Towers.
- Clorindo Testa (1923–2013), was a renowned architect and artist, famous for designing The National Library in Buenos Aires.

== Chess players ==
- Paolo Boi (1528–1598), was a chess player. "He is widely considered the 3rd unofficial chess champion of the world from 1587–1598."
- Giovanni Leonardo Di Bona (1542–1587), was a "Neapolitan lawyer and one of the strongest players of his time."
- Giulio Cesare Polerio (c. 1550 – c. 1610), was a master who made significant contributions to chess analysis and theory.
- Alessandro Salvio (c. 1570 – c. 1640), was a "chess player who was considered by many to be the 4th unofficial world champion between the years 1598 and 1620."
- Pietro Carrera (1573–1647), was a priest, chess player and author from Militello, Sicily.
- Gioachino Greco (c. 1600 – c. 1634), also known as Il Calabrese, was "the most famous [chess] player of the seventeenth century."
- Fabiano Caruana (born 1992), is a former chess prodigy. One of the youngest grandmasters of all times.

== Cinematography ==
- Elvira Notari (1875–1946), "was the first Italian female filmmaker."
- Ricciotto Canudo (1877–1923), was a writer, critic and film theoretician, lived in Paris from about 1902.
- Robert G. Vignola (1882–1953), actor, screenwriter and film director, considered "one of the silent screen's most prolific directors".
- Rudolph Valentino (1895–1926), an actor who was idolized as the "Great Lover" of the 1920s.
- Frank Capra (1897–1991), motion-picture director who was the most prominent filmmaker of the 1930s, during which he won three Academy Awards as best director.
- Totò (1898–1967), was a comedian, film and theatre actor, writer, singer and songwriter. He has been compared to such figures as Buster Keaton and Charlie Chaplin.
- Eduardo De Filippo (1900–1984), one of the twentieth century's greatest playwrights, was also an original interpreter of his plays and a cinema actor as well.
- Vittorio De Sica (1901–1974), film director and actor. His Shoeshine, The Bicycle Thief, and Umberto D. are classics of postwar Italian neorealism.
- Peppino De Filippo (1903–1980), was a comic actor of the screen and stage.
- Amedeo Nazzari (1907–1979), real name Salvatore Amedeo Buffa, was a famous actor from Sardinia.
- Ennio Flaiano (1910–1972), "screenwriter, playwright, novelist, journalist, and drama critic."
- Dino De Laurentiis (1919–2010), was "one of the most colorful, prolific, and successful producers in the contemporary motion picture business."
- Vincent Gardenia (January 1920 – 1992), was a performer who had an award-winning career as a character actor on stage, films and television.
- Ugo Pirro (April 1920 – 2008), was a scriptwriter who co-wrote two Oscar-winning films.
- Adolfo Celi (July 1922 – 1986), "gained renown as a 'renaissance' man of theater and films, doing triple duty as an actor, writer and director."
- Francesco Rosi (November 1922), is a film director, best known for his masterpiece Salvatore Giuliano.
- Nanni Loy (1925–1995), film director. He was well known for his film The Four Days of Naples, which was nominated in 1963 for an Oscar for Best Foreign Film.
- Pasqualino De Santis (1927–1996), was a cinematographer. In 1969, he earned an Academy Award for his superb photography of Franco Zeffirelli's Romeo and Juliet.
- Bud Spencer (1929–2016), an actor and filmmaker. He is best known for starring in multiple action and western films together with his longtime film partner Terence Hill.
- Ettore Scola (1931–2016), is among the most daring, creative, innovative, and committed of the great Italian writer-directors.
- Pier Angeli (19 June 1932 – 1971), was a popular actress in the fifties. She received an Oscar nomination and won a Golden Globe.
- Marisa Pavan (19 June 1932 – 2023), actress and twin sister of Pier Angeli. She won a Golden Globe and was nominated for an Oscar for her work in The Rose Tattoo.
- Sophia Loren (born 1934), film actress. She won a best actress Academy Award for Two Women. Other films include Marriage Italian Style.
- Claudia Cardinale (1938–2025), was an actress who appeared in some of the most prominent European films of the 1960s and 1970s.
- Ruggero Deodato (1939–2022), was a film director, actor and screenwriter, famous for his 1980 film Cannibal Holocaust., considered the precursor of the found footage genre.
- Dario Argento (Note: Sicilian from father side.) (born 1940), is a film director known for his mastery of the horror genre. Deep Red along with Suspiria is one of the best Argento films.
- Gianni Amelio (born 1945), one of Italy's most revered modern directors, whose 1992 film The Stolen Children won the Special Jury Prize at the Cannes Film Festival.
- Michele Placido (born 1946), is an internationally known actor and director.
- Gabriele Salvatores (born 1950), is best known as the director of the war drama Mediterraneo, which won the Oscar for Best Foreign language Film in 1992.
- Massimo Troisi (1953–1994), was an actor, film director, and poet. He is internationally known due to the success of the movie Il Postino.
- Ornella Muti (born 1955), is an actress, known for Oscar, Flash Gordon, and Un couple épatant.
- Giuseppe Tornatore (born 1956), film director and screenwriter. He earned international acclaim in 1988 with his second film, Cinema Paradiso.
- Giuliana De Sio (born 1957), is an actress, known for The Pool Hustlers, The Wicked, and Scusate il ritardo.
- Mauro Fiore (born 1964), Academy Award-winning cinematographer for Avatar.
- Valeria Golino (born 1965), is a famous actress, known to a large audience for her interest in different types of genres of movies and roles.
- Paolo Sorrentino (born 1970), film director and screenwriter. Internationally known for his film The Great Beauty.
- Giovanna Mezzogiorno (born 1974), is an actress and producer, known for Facing Windows, Vincere, and The Last Kiss.

== Criminals ==
=== Bandits ===
- Fra Diavolo (1771–1806), bandit and military leader who fought the French occupation of Naples.
- Ciro Annunchiarico (1775–1817), Apulian priest and brigand.
- Carmine Crocco (1830–1905), the most famous brigand of the Italian unification, noted for heading 2.000 men and for his brilliant guerrilla warfare.
- Giuseppe Musolino (1876–1956), brigand from Calabria.
- Salvatore Giuliano (1922–1950), bandit, active in Sicily during the Second World War.

=== Mafia ===
- Vito Cascioferro (1862–1943), was a member of the Inglese Mafia family in Palermo, Sicily, and had fled to New York in 1900 to avoid a murder charge.
- James Colosimo (1877–1920), "crime czar in Chicago from about 1902 until his death, owner of plush brothels, saloons, and a nightclub."
- Johnny Torrio (1882–1957), was a gangster who became a top crime boss in Chicago.
- Joe Masseria (1886–1931), "leading crime boss of New York City from the early 1920s until his murder in 1931."
- Frank Nitti (1886–1943), a gangster who was Al Capone's chief enforcer and inherited Capone's criminal empire when Capone went to prison in 1931.
- Frank Costello (1891–1973), nicknamed "The Prime Minister of the Underworld," he became one of the most powerful and influential mob bosses in American history.
- Joe Profaci (1897–1962), was "one of the most powerful bosses in U.S. organized crime from the 1940s to the early 1960s."
- Lucky Luciano (1897–1962), mobster who is credited as the father of modern organized crime in the United States.
- Vito Genovese (1897–1969), was one of the most powerful figures in the history of organized crime in the United States.
- Carlo Gambino (1902–1976), was the most powerful crime figure in the United States before his death in 1976.
- Albert Anastasia (1902–1957), was one of the most ruthless and feared Cosa Nostra mobsters in U. S. history.
- Antonio Macrì (c. 1902–1975), was a historical and charismatic boss of the 'Ndrangheta.
- Michele Navarra (1905–1958), doctor and Mafia boss in Corleone; murdered in 1958 by his fosterson, Luciano Leggio.
- Joseph Bonanno (1905–2002), was a mafioso who became the boss of the Bonanno crime family.
- Luciano Leggio (1925–1993), was a criminal and leading figure of the Sicilian Mafia.
- Tommaso Buscetta (1928–2000), was an influential Sicilian mafioso from Palermo.
- Salvatore Riina (1930–2017), was a member of the Sicilian Mafia. The most powerful member of the criminal organization in the early 1980s.
- Giuseppe Calò (born 1931), is a Sicilian Mafia boss, also known as the "Mafia's cashier."
- Bernardo Provenzano (1933–2016), was a member of the Sicilian Mafia. The boss of bosses of the entire Sicilian Mafia until his arrest in 2006.
- Giuseppe Morabito (born 1934), is a criminal and a historical boss of the 'Ndrangheta.
- Benedetto Santapaola (1938–2026), better known as Nitto was a prominent mafioso from Catania.
- Stefano Bontade (1939–1981), was an influential member of the Sicilian Mafia.
- Raffaele Cutolo (1941–2021), was a crime boss and the charismatic leader of the Nuova Camorra Organizzata.
- Leoluca Bagarella (born 1942), is a member of the Sicilian Mafia.
- Salvatore Lo Piccolo (born 1942), is a Sicilian mafioso and one of the most powerful bosses of Palermo.
- Luigi Giuliano (born 1949), is a former Camorrista who was the boss of the powerful Giuliano clan, based in the district of Forcella, Naples.
- Francesco Schiavone (January 1953), is an influential member of the Camorra.
- Paolo Di Lauro (August 1953), is a crime boss, leader of the Di Lauro Clan, a Camorra crime organization.
- Edoardo Contini (born 1955), is a Camorra boss. He is the founder and head of the Contini clan.
- Giovanni Brusca (born 1957), is a former member of the Sicilian Mafia.
- Michele Zagaria (born 1958), is a boss of the Camorra clan Casalesi.
- Matteo Messina Denaro (born 1962), is a Sicilian mafioso. According to Forbes magazine he is among the ten most wanted criminals in the world.

=== Antimafia ===
- Joseph Petrosino (1860–1909), a police detective who was killed by the Mafia in Palermo in 1909.
- Cesare Terranova (1921–1979), a magistrate and member of the Italian parliament who was murdered by the Mafia.
- Libero Grassi (1924–1991), a Palermo small businessman who had made public his refusal to pay protection money, was killed outside his home.
- Rocco Chinnici (1925–1983), an investigative magistrate, was killed by the Mafia in the summer of 1983.
- Giuseppe Fava (1925–1984), was a writer, journalist, playwright, and Antimafia activist who was killed by the Mafia.
- Pio La Torre (1927–1982), the Communist member of parliament, and author of the law which bears his name on combating the Mafia, was killed in 1982.
- Pino Puglisi (1937–1993), was a parish priest in Palermo, well known for his Antimafia position.
- Giovanni Falcone (1939–1992), was an Antimafia magistrate. He was killed along with his wife and three bodyguards.
- Paolo Borsellino (1940–1992), was an Antimafia prosecutor who was killed by a Mafia car bomb in Palermo.
- Pietro Grasso (born 1945), former Antimafia magistrate, was born in Licata, on 1 January 1945.
- Giuseppe Impastato (1948–1978), was a political activist who opposed the Mafia that ordered his murder in 1978.
- Rosario Livatino (1952–1990), a brave young Antimafia prosecutor who was killed by Mafia.
- Rita Atria (1974–1992), was a key witness in a major Mafia investigation in Sicily. A powerful symbol of the fight for truth, justice, and the defeat of the Mafia.
- Roberto Saviano (born 1979), is a writer and journalist. Author of Gomorrah, a best-selling exposé of the Camorra Mafia in Naples.

== Economists ==
- Ferdinando Galiani (1728–1787), also called Abbe Galiani, was a man of letters, economist and wit, friend of the Parisian philosophes.
- Enrico Barone (1859–1924), was "a mathematical economist and disciple of Vilfredo Pareto."
- Francesco Saverio Nitti (1868–1953), was an "economist, promoter of southern economic development, and liberal leader."
- Ignazio Visco (born 1949), was Chief Economist and Director of the Economic Department of the Organisation for Economic Co-operation and Development (1997–2002).

== Engineers ==
- Luigi Giura (1795–1865), was an engineer and architect. He built the magnificent bridge in the Garigliano, the first suspended iron bridge built in Italy.
- Nicola Romeo (1876–1938), an engineer and entrepreneur, was the founder of Alfa Romeo.
- Giovanni Agusta (1879–1927), an aviation engineer, was the founder of Agusta, now part of AgustaWestland.
- Corradino D'Ascanio (1891–1981), was an aeronautical engineer who prior to designing the Vespa, designed the first production helicopter for Agusta.
- Giuseppe Gabrielli (1903–1987), was an "aeronautical and mechanical engineer."

== Explorers ==
- Henri de Tonti (1649/50 – 1704), explorer and colonizer, companion of the Sieur de La Salle during his North American explorations.
- Umberto Nobile (1885–1978), aeronautical engineer and Arctic explorer. He was one of the first men to fly over the North Pole.

== Fashion designers ==
- Elsa Schiaparelli (1890–1973), was one of the most highly renowned fashion innovators in the period leading up to World War II.
- Salvatore Ferragamo (1898–1960), was a famous shoe designer, founder of the company that bears his name.
- Rocco Barocco (born 1944), is a fashion designer who has registered his name as a trademark in several countries in the field of fashion, design and accessories.
- Gianni Versace (1946–1997), was a fashion designer known for his daring fashions and glamorous lifestyle.
- Donatella Versace (born 1955), is one of best known names in fashion today. She is the younger sister of the late designer Gianni Versace.
- Domenico Dolce (born 1958), is a famous fashion designer. He is the co-founder of Dolce & Gabbana.
- Carlo Capasa (born 1958), president of Camera Nazionale della Moda Italiana
- Ennio Capasa (born 1960), is a fashion designer and founder of Costume National.

== Fashion models ==
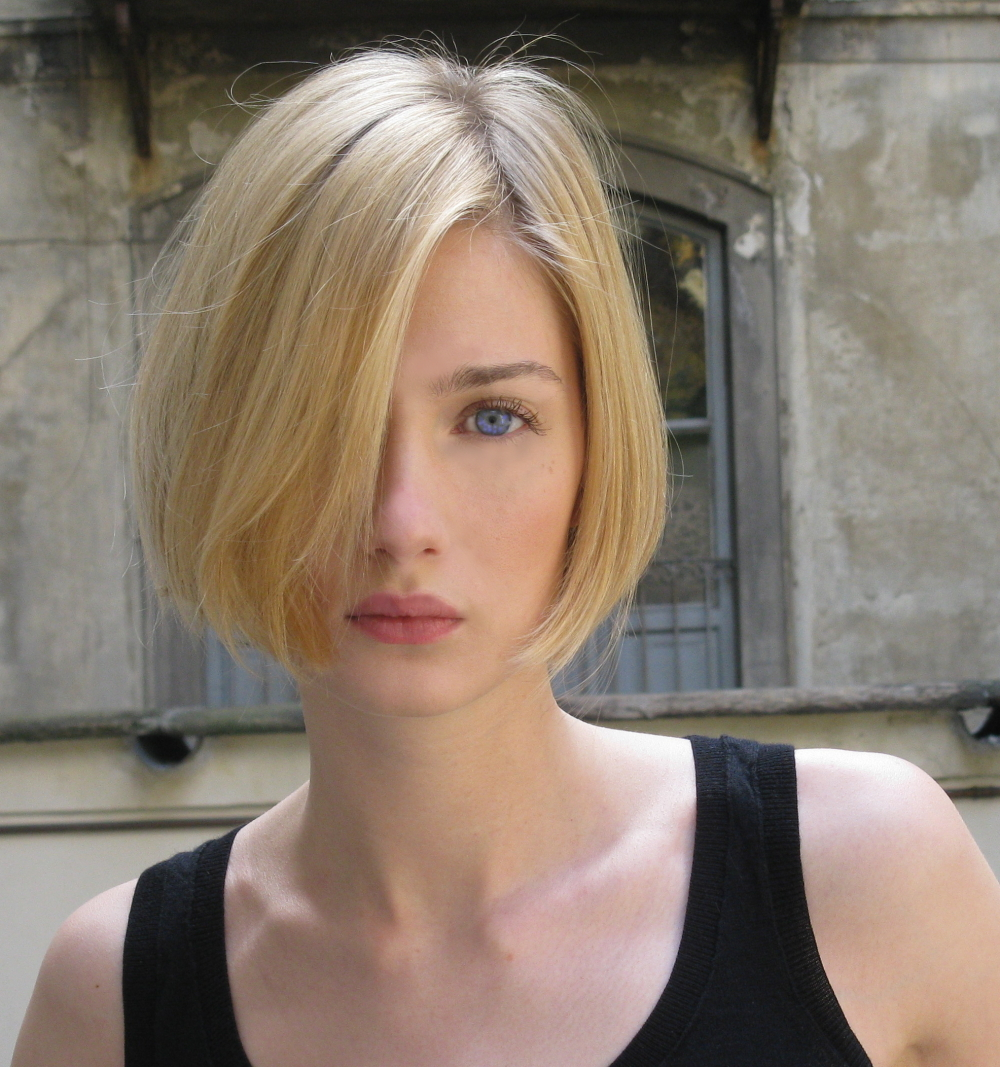
The Sicilian top model Eva Riccobono.

- Valeria Marini (born 1967), is a model, actress, showgirl, and fashion designer.
- Maria Grazia Cucinotta (July 1968), is a model, actress, producer, and screenwriter.
- Roberta Capua (December 1968), is a former model and television personality.
- Mara Carfagna (born 1975), is a former model and showgirl and current Italian politician.
- Alessia Fabiani (born 1976), is a model, showgirl, and TV presenter.
- Manuela Arcuri (born 1977), is a model, actress, and television host.
- Elisabetta Canalis (born 1978), is a model, actress, and showgirl.
- Elisabetta Gregoraci (born 1980), is a model and TV personality.
- Giorgia Palmas (March 1982), is a model and actress.
- Valeria Bilello (May 1982), is a model and actress.
- Eva Riccobono (born 1983), is a model and actress.
- Miriam Leone (born 1985), is a model, TV presenter, and actress.
- Raffaella Fico (born 1988), is a model and showgirl.

== Military figures ==
- Bohemond I of Antioch (c. 1058 – 1111), was prince of Otranto and prince of Antioch, one of the leaders of the First Crusade, who conquered Antioch.
- Maio of Bari (1115–1160), was the Grand Admiral of William I of Sicily between 1154 and 1160.
- Roger of Lauria (c. 1245 – 1305), admiral of Aragon and Sicily, was "the most prominent figure in the naval war which arose directly from the Sicilian Vespers."
- Roger de Flor (1267–1305), was a Knight Templar and military adventurer, Grand Duke and Caesar of the Byzantine Empire.
- Angelo Tartaglia (1350 or 1370 – 1421), was a great soldier of fortune, captain of the Papal Army, lord of Lavello and Toscanella.
- Giovanni Caracciolo (1372–432), Prince of Naples
- Jacopo Caldora (1369 – 1439) was an Italian condottiero.
- Roberto Sanseverino d'Aragona (1418 – 10 August 1487) was a Neapolitan condottiero, Highly esteemed man of arms, veteran of numerous battles, he was one of the greatest leaders of the Italian Renaissance.
- Fabrizio Maramaldo (1494—December 1552) was an Italian Condottiero.
- Lelio Brancaccio (1560–1637), Marquess of Montesilvano, was a Neapolitan commander of Habsburg armies
- Giorgio Basta (1544–1607), was a celebrated general who won fame in campaigns in Eastern Europe, and wrote on military affairs.
- Camillo Caracciolo, 2nd Prince of Avellino (1563- 1630), was a Neapolitan military leader and statesman of the Kingdom of Naples and the Spanish Empire.
- Girolamo Carafa (1564 – 1633) was general in Spanish and Imperial service from Abruzzo. He participated in the Thirty Years War and the Eighty Years War. He is remembered for his major contribution at the Battle of White Mountain.
- Ottavio d'Aragona Taglivia (1565–1623) was a Sicilian commander and nobleman in the service of the Hispanic Monarchy.
- Tommaso Caracciolo (1572–1631), was a Field Marshal who commanded parts of the Spanish forces in the Thirty Years' War.
- Carlo Andrea Caracciolo, 2nd Marquis of Torrecuso, (1583–1646 ), was a Neapolitan nobleman and soldier in the service of the Spanish Empire
- Andrea Cantelmo (1598 – 1645) was a Neapolitan commander of Habsburg armies during the Thirty Years' War, the War of the Mantuan Succession, the second phase of the Eighty Years' War, the Franco-Spanish War (1635–59), and the Reapers War.
- Francesco Eboli (1693–1758) was an Italian nobleman and soldier, Duke of Castropignano. Famous for his victory at the Battle of Velletri (1744)
- Leonardo VII Tocco (1698–1776), Prince of Montemiletto Field Marshal and Cavalry Commander for the Kingdom of Naples
- Giuseppe Parisi (27 March 1745 – 1824) was an Italian military leader, modernized the military academy of the Nunziatella.
- Francesco Caracciolo (1752–1799) Neapolitan admiral, nobleman and revolutionary
- Domenico Millelire (1761–1827), was a Sardegna's fleet captain. He gave the first defeat to Napoleon Bonaparte.
- Lucio Caracciolo (1771 - 1836) was a Neapolitan aristocrat and general who was a distinguished member of the Courts and Cavalry Commander in the Napoleonic Wars
- Pietro Colletta (1775–1831), "Neapolitan general and historian, served in the Neapolitan artillery against the French in 1798."
- Guglielmo Pepe (1783–1855), was a "general and liberal patriot who fought for Italian independence."
- Carlo Filangieri (1784–1867), prince of Satriano, was a Neapolitan soldier and statesman.
- Carlo Pisacane (1818–1857), "military figure, patriot, social commentator, and theorist."
- Enrico Cosenz (1820–1898), was a soldier, born at Gaeta on 12 January 1820, served in the Neapolitan artillery against the Austrians in 1848.
- Armando Diaz (1861–1928), was a general. As a reward for his military successes, he was named Duke of Victory in 1921 and appointed marshal in 1924.
- Giulio Douhet (1869–1930), was an army general and "the father of strategic air power."
- Giovanni Messe (1883–1968), was a soldier, later politician and likely the most distinguished Italian Field marshal.
- Fulco Ruffo di Calabria (1884–1946), was a World War I flying ace (20 victories).
- Luigi Rizzo (1887–1951), was the famous naval officer who sank the Austrian dreadnought Szent István in June 1918.
- Achille Starace (1889–1945), was a "veteran of the First World War and national secretary of Mussolini's Fascist Party between 1931 and 1939."
- Tito Minniti (1909–1935), was an aviator. He is still commemorated in his hometown every year as a military hero.
- Salvo D'Acquisto (1920–1943), was a carabiniere who sacrificed his own life to save the lives of 22 civilian hostages at the time of the Nazi occupation.

== Missionaries ==
- John of Montecorvino (1247–1328), "was the first Catholic missionary to Asia."
- Alessandro Valignano (1539–1606), was a "Jesuit missionary who helped introduce Christianity to the Far East, especially to Japan."
- Giordano Ansaloni (1598–1634), a Sicilian missionary, who in 1632 visited Japan, where he was put to death in 1634.
- Lodovico Buglio (1606–1682), was a "Jesuit missionary in China."
- Francis de Geronimo (1642–1716), was a Jesuit priest and missionary also known as Francis Jerome.
- Matteo Ripa (1682–1746), was a missionary, painter, and founder of the Collegio dei Cinesi in Naples.
- Angelo Zottoli (1826–1902), was born in Acerno. He came to China in 1848 and spent all his missionary life in Zikawei, Shanghai.

== Musicians ==
- Carlo Gesualdo (1560–1613), composer famed for his chromatic madrigals and motets.
- Sigismondo d'India (c. 1582 – 1629), was the most important composer active in Sicily during the early part of the 17th century.
- Luigi Rossi (c. 1597 – 1653), was a Baroque composer of chamber cantatas, operas, and church music.
- Francesco Provenzale (c. 1626 – 1704), "Neapolitan composer – one of the driving forces behind the establishment of Neapolitan opera – and teacher."
- Alessandro Scarlatti (1660–1725), prolific and influential composer of the Baroque era.
- Michele Mascitti (1664–1760), violinist and Baroque composer. He was considered comparable to Corelli and Albinoni.
- Pietro Filippo Scarlatti (1679–1750), was a composer, organist, and choirmaster who was a prominent member of the Italian Baroque School.
- Francesco Durante (1684–1755), was a leading composer of church music in the early 18th century, as well as an internationally renowned teacher in Naples.
- Domenico Scarlatti (1685–1757), harpsichordist and composer. His harpsichord sonatas are highly distinctive and original.
- Nicola Porpora (1686–1768), composer. He was a prominent master of the Neapolitan operatic style.
- Leonardo Vinci (1690–1730), "composer who was one of the originators of the Neapolitan style of opera."
- Francesco Feo (1691–1761), was a composer lauded by Reichardt in 1791 as "one of the greatest of all composers of church music in Italy."
- Leonardo Leo (1694–1744), prolific composer, teacher, and conservatory administrator.
- Farinelli (1705–1782), "legendary soprano castrato, composer of arias and keyboard works, and theatrical producer."
- Egidio Duni (1708–1775), was one of the chief opéra comique composers of his day.
- Caffarelli (1710–1783), was a mezzo-soprano castrato. "As a singer he was ranked second only to Farinelli with an enchanting voice and fine execution."
- Niccolò Jommelli (1714–1774), composer of religious music and operas, notable as an innovator in his use of the orchestra.
- Ignazio Fiorillo (1715–1787), was a "composer of fourteen operas, symphonies, sonatas, an oratorio and church music; pupil of Leo and Durante."
- Tommaso Traetta (1727–1779), was an opera composer who in some senses anticipated Gluck's reforms of the medium.
- Niccolò Piccinni (1728–1800), was better known for his comic operas, though he was equally adept in the realm of opera seria.
- Giovanni Paisiello (1740–1816), composer of operas admired for their robust realism and dramatic power.
- Domenico Cimarosa (1749–1801), operatic composer. He wrote almost 80 operas, which were successfully produced in Rome, Naples, Vienna, and St. Petersburg.
- Niccolò Antonio Zingarelli (1752–1837), was "one of the principal Italian composers of operas and religious music of his time."
- Ferdinando Carulli (1770–1841), was an important guitarist, composer and teacher.
- Mauro Giuliani (1781–1829), was "the most important guitarist and composer of guitar music of his time."
- Michele Carafa (1787–1872), was "one of the most prolific opera composers of his day."
- Luigi Lablache (1794–1858), was a well-known bass of the Classical and early Romantic eras.
- Saverio Mercadante (1795–1870), was an important opera composer who studied at the Naples Conservatory and began composing in 1819.
- Salvadore Cammarano (March 1801 – 1852), was among the most prolific writers for Italian romantic opera.
- Vincenzo Bellini (November 1801 – 1835), composer of operas. His most notable works were Norma and La sonnambula, and I puritani.
- Federico Ricci (1809–1877), was a famous composer, brother of Luigi Ricci.
- Giovanni Matteo Mario (1810–1883), Cavaliere di Candia, better known simply as Mario, was a world-famous opera singer.
- Errico Petrella (1813–1877), was an influential opera composer.
- Gaetano Braga (1829–1907), was an eminent cellist and composer who lived mainly in London and Paris.
- Luigi Denza (February 1846 – 1922), was the composer of the immortal Neapolitan Piedigrotta song Funiculì, Funiculà.
- Paolo Tosti (April 1846 – 1916), eminent composer of songs, was born in Ortona, Abruzzi, on 9 April 1846.
- Giuseppe Martucci (1856–1909), "was a pioneer in restoring instrumental music to a place of prominence in nineteenth-century operatic Italy."
- Ruggero Leoncavallo (1857–1919), composer and librettist who wrote the opera Pagliacci.
- Eduardo di Capua (1865–1917), was the composer of several of the greatest Neapolitan songs, including 'O sole mio, Maria, Marì, and I' te vurria vasà.
- Francesco Cilea (1866–1950), composer whose operas are distinguished by their melodic charm.
- Umberto Giordano (1867–1948), composer. His most famous work is the richly melodic Andrea Chénier. Fedora and Madame Sans-Gêne are also well known.
- Vittorio Monti (1868–1922), was "an eminent composer, mandolinist and conductor."
- Enrico Caruso (1873–1921), was considered one of the greatest singers in the history of opera. He "is for many the Italian tenor par excellence."
- Franco Alfano (March 1875 – 1954), was an "eminent composer and teacher."
- Leonardo De Lorenzo (August 1875 – 1962), was one of the world's foremost flutists.
- Giuseppe Anselmi (1876–1929), was a gifted lyrico-spinto tenor of Sicilian birth.
- E. A. Mario (1884–1961), was a prolific author of songs in dialect and in Italian (La leggenda del Piave, Vipera, and Balocchi e profumi to mention only a few).
- Tito Schipa (1888–1965), tenor. He sang in Italy from 1910, specializing in lyrical roles.
- Maria Caniglia (1905–1979), was "the leading Italian lyric-dramatic soprano of the 1930s."
- Licia Albanese (1909–2014), operatic soprano who was a great favorite of Arturo Toscanini.
- Carlo Maria Giulini (1914–2005), "was the leading Italian conductor of his generation."
- Renato Carosone (1920–2001), was a cabaret singer. A key figure in Italian music, Carosone recorded the 1957 hit Torero.
- Giuseppe Di Stefano (1921–2008), lyric tenor who was hailed as one of the finest operatic tenors of his generation.
- Domenico Modugno (1928–1994), singer, songwriter, and actor. He was best known for singing the international hit Volare, which Modugno co-wrote.
- Dalida (1933–1987), was a singer, achieved immense popularity on the international pop and disco music scene between the 1950s and the 1980s.
- Adriano Celentano (born 1938), is a celebrated singer, actor, comedian, and director. He is the best-selling male Italian singer.
- Peppino di Capri (born 1939), is one of the most famous Italian songs in the world.
- Nicola Di Bari (born 1940), is a celebrated pop singer. He won the Sanremo Music Festival in 1971 and 1972.
- Riccardo Muti (July 1941), is a "conductor in the old style – fiery, demanding, and charismatic."
- Salvatore Accardo (September 1941), is considered one of the greatest violin talents of the Italian school of the 20th century.
- Mario Trevi (November 1941), is a well-known Neapolitan singer.
- Albano Carrisi (born 1943), is one of the most celebrated singers of Italian modern music.
- Franco Battiato (1945–2021), was one of the most important avant-garde composers.
- Salvatore Sciarrino (April 1947), "is one of Europe's most prolific composers."
- Mia Martini (September 1947 – 1995), pseudonym of Domenica Berté, was a popular and critically acclaimed Italian singer.
- Rino Gaetano (1950–1981), was an original and innovative singer and musician, who died prematurely in a car crash.
- Massimo Ranieri (born 1951), pop singer and actor. He is a big name in music in Italy.
- Mango (1954–2014), "Italian rock fusion innovator".
- Pino Daniele (1955–2015), is a famous Neapolitan singer.
- Raf (born 1959), singer and songwriter. He is the author of the original version of "Self Control".
- Fabio Biondi (March 1961), is a violinist and conductor most renowned for his interpretation of the Italian baroque repertoire.
- Anna Oxa (April 1961), is a singer. She won the Sanremo Music Festival twice, in 1989 with "Ti lascerò" and in 1999 with "Senza pietà".
- Gigi D'Alessio (born 1967), is a popular singer and Neapolitan singer-songwriter.
- Salvatore Licitra (1968–2011), was a tenor known in his Italian homeland as the "new Pavarotti" for his potent voice and considerable stamina.
- Ildebrando D'Arcangelo (born 1969), is a bass-baritone. He "has established himself as one of the most exciting singers of his generation."
- Caparezza (born 1973), is the pseudonym of Michele Salvemini. He is a famous Apulian rapper.
- Carmen Consoli (born 1974), is a singer-songwriter. One of Italy's leading popular musicians.

== Painters ==
- Niccolò Antonio Colantonio (c. 1420 – c. 1460), was a painter. "The leading figure at the court of King René of Anjou at Naples."
- Antonello da Messina (c. 1430 – 1479), was one of the most groundbreaking and influential painters of the quattrocento.
- Girolamo Alibrandi (1470–1524), was a distinguished painter, called "the Raphael of Messina."
- Scipione Pulzone (c. 1542 or 1543 – 1598), was a painter. "He painted historical and religious subjects and was a celebrated portraitist."
- Mario Minniti (1577–1640), was a painter. "With Alonzo Rodriguez he represents the most direct Sicilian response to the new art of Caravaggio."
- Battistello Caracciolo (1578–1635), was an important Neapolitan follower of Caravaggio – and only a few years younger.
- Massimo Stanzione (c. 1586 – c. 1656), was a talented painter. This earned him the nickname of "Napolitan Guido Reni."
- Andrea Vaccaro (May 1600 – 1670), was a tenebrist painter.
- Aniello Falcone (November 1600 – 1656), was a painter known principally for his depictions of battlefields.
- Pietro Novelli (1603–1647), was a renowned painter otherwise known as il Monrealese.
- Francesco Cozza (1605–1682), was a painter of the Baroque period. He was born at Stilo, in Calabria.
- Mattia Preti (1613–1699), painter. One of the most talented southern artists, who did much of his best work for the Knights of Malta.
- Salvator Rosa (1615–1673), painter and polymath. His best-known paintings represent scenes of wild, un trammeled nature, populated with small genre figures.
- Bernardo Cavallino (1616–1656), was a famous Neapolitan painter of the first half of the 17th century.
- Antonio de Bellis (c. 1616 – c. 1656), was a painter. "He worked primarily in Naples in a formidable naturalistic style deeply influenced by Jusepe de Ribera."
- Giuseppe Recco (June 1634 – 1695), "was the most celebrated Neapolitan still-life painter of his day."
- Luca Giordano (October 1634 – 1705), painter and draughtsman. He was one of the most celebrated artists of the Neapolitan Baroque.
- Francesco Solimena (1657–1747), was one of the great Italian artists of the Baroque era.
- Sebastiano Conca (1680–1764), was a Neapolitan painter and a pupil of Solimena.
- Corrado Giaquinto (1703–1765), was a famous Rococo painter.
- Giuseppe Bonito (1707–1789), was a painter. "One of the most influential artists of the Neapolitan school in the 18th century."
- Vito D'Anna (1718–1769), was a painter. One of the most important artists of Sicily.
- Gaspare Traversi (c. 1722 – 1770), an important Neapolitan painter, was the creator of elegant and sometimes raucous genre scenes.
- Domenico Morelli (1826–1901), was a leading exponent of the Neapolitan school of painting in the second half of the 19th century.
- Francesco Lojacono (1838–1915), was a Sicilian landscape and seascape painter.
- Giacomo Di Chirico (1844–1883), painter. He was one of the most elite Neapolitan artists of the 19th century.
- Giuseppe De Nittis (1846–1884), was an influential painter. "Early in his career he was associated with the Macchiaioli."
- Francesco Paolo Michetti (1851–1929), was "one of the most important painters of the second half of the 19th century."
- Eliseu Visconti (1866–1944), was one of the most important painters in Brazil in the early 20th century.
- Joseph Stella (1877–1946), was a painter. He is best known for his cubist- and futurist-inspired paintings executed in the years around 1920.
- Mario Sironi (1885–1961), painter, sculptor, architect, stage designer and illustrator.
- Giorgio de Chirico (1888–1978), painter, writer, theatre designer, sculptor and printmaker. De Chirico was one of the originators of pittura metafisica.
- Michele Cascella (1892–1989), was a painter, ceramist, and lithographer. In 1937 he won the gold medal at the Paris Exposition Universelle.
- Antonio Sicurezza (1905–1979), was a famous painter, born at Santa Maria Capua Vetere, in Campania.
- Renato Guttuso (1912–1987), painter. "He was a forceful personality and Italy's leading exponent of Social Realism in the 20th century."
- Antonio Cardile (1914–1986), was an artist of the Roman School of painting.
- Luigi Malice (born 1937), is a famous painter and sculptor.
- Mimmo Paladino (born 1948), is a painter, sculptor and printmaker. He was a key figure in the so-called Transavantgarde movement.
- Silvio Vigliaturo (born 1949), is a master of glass-fusing, famous for his paintings, sculptures, stained-glass windows and floors.
- Francesco Clemente (born 1952), painter and draftsman. He worked collaboratively with other artists such as Jean-Michel Basquiat and Andy Warhol.

== Political figures ==
Main articles: Politicians from Abruzzo, Politicians from Molise, Politicians from Campania, Politicians from Apulia,

Politicians from Basilicata, Politicians from Calabria, Politicians from Sicily, and Politicians from Sardinia

- Roger II of Sicily (1095–1154), was "the most able ruler in 12th-century Europe."
- Frederick II, Holy Roman Emperor (1194–1250), also known as Frederick II of Sicily, was one of the most brilliant rulers of the Middle Ages.
- Manfred, King of Sicily (1232–1266), effective king of Sicily from 1258, during a period of civil wars and succession disputes between imperial claimants and the House of Anjou.
- Marianus IV of Arborea (1329–1376), called the Great, was the Giudice of Arborea from 1347 to his death.
- Eleanor of Arborea (1347–1404), reconquered Sardinia, sustaining a two years' war against the Aragonese, and distinguished herself as a legislator.
- Ladislaus of Naples (1377–1414), was a skilled political and military leader, protector and controller of Pope Innocent VII.
- Cardinal Mazarin (1602–1661), was a political genius and priest, later cardinal, who served as the chief minister of France from 1642 until his death.
- Francesco Crispi (1818–1901), was a statesman. He was among the key figures of Italy's unification in 1860.
- Vittorio Emanuele Orlando (1860–1952), was a statesman and prime minister during the concluding years of World War I.
- Luigi Sturzo (1871–1959), was a Catholic political leader and leading opponent of Fascism.
- Enrico De Nicola (1877–1959), was a "member of parliament and first head of state of the Italian republic."
- Carlo Tresca (1879–1943), was a newspaper editor, anarchist, and early opponent of Italian fascism.
- Antonio Segni (1891–1972), was a statesman, twice premier (1955–1957, 1959–1960), and fourth president (1962–1964) of Italy.
- Giovanni Leone (1908–2001), was a politician and statesman. Professor of the law of criminal procedure. Prominent member of the Christian Democratic Party.
- Aldo Moro (1916–1978), was a prominent leader of Italy's Christian Democratic Party. In 1978 he was kidnapped and then murdered by the Red Brigades.
- Emilio Colombo (1920–2013), was a political leader. He is "credited with having written much of the Treaty of Rome, which established (1958) the European Economic Community."
- Enrico Berlinguer (1922–1984), was secretary of the Italian Communist Party from 1972 to his sudden death in 1984.
- Giorgio Napolitano (1925–2023), also known as King George, is a politician and former lifetime senator, the 11th President of Italy since 2006.
- Francesco Cossiga (1928–2010), was a politician, the 43rd Prime Minister and the eighth President of the Italian Republic.

=== Popes ===
- Pope Zachary (679–752) was the last pope of the Byzantine Papacy. Zachary built the original church of Santa Maria sopra Minerva, forbade the traffic of slaves in Rome, and negotiated peace with the Lombards. Zachary is regarded as a capable administrator and a skillful and subtle diplomat in a dangerous time.
- Pope Victor III (c. 1026 – 1087), original name Daufer, was pope from 1086 to 1087.
- Pope Gregory VIII (c. 1100/1105 – 1187), original name Alberto di Morra, was pope from 25 October to 17 December 1187.
- Pope Celestine V (1215–1296), original name Pietro Angelerio, was pope from 5 July to 13 December 1294, the first pontiff to abdicate.
- Pope Urban VI (c. 1318 – 1389), original name Bartolomeo Prignano, was pope from 1378 to 1389.
- Pope Innocent VII (1336–1406), original name Cosimo de' Migliorati, was pope from 1404 to 1406.
- Pope Boniface IX (c. 1350 – 1404), original name Piero Tomacelli, was pope from 1389 to 1404.
- Pope Paul IV (1476–1559), original name Gian Pietro Carafa, was pope from 1555 to 1559.
- Pope Innocent XII (1615–1700), original name Antonio Pignatelli, was pope from 1691 to 1700.
- Pope Benedict XIII (1650–1730), original name Pietro Francesco Orsini, was pope from 1724 to 1730.

== Saints ==
- Nicodemus of Mammola (c. 900 – 990), was a Calabrian ascetic and monastic founder.
- Nilus the Younger (910–1005), was a monk, abbot, and founder of Italo-Greek monasticism in southern Italy.
- Alferius (930–1050), was an abbot and saint. He was the founder of the monastery of La Trinità della Cava, located at Cava de' Tirreni.
- John Theristus (1049–1129), was a Benedictine monk, called Theristus (or "Harvester").
- Constabilis (c. 1070 – 1124), was an abbot. Constabilis built the town of Castellabate, where he is now venerated as patron.
- Saint Rosalia (1130–1166), is the patron saint of Palermo.
- John of Capistrano (1386–1456), was "one of the greatest Franciscan preachers of the 15th century."
- Francis of Paola (1416–1507), was a mendicant friar and the founder of the Roman Catholic Order of Minims.
- Eustochia Smeralda Calafato (1434–1485), was a Franciscan abbess of Messina.
- Andrew Avellino (1521–1608), was a Theologian, founder of monasteries, and friend of St. Charles Borromeo.
- Benedict the Moor (1526–1589), ex-slave born in Sicily of African parents. A Franciscan friar, he was canonized by Pope Pius VII in 1807.
- Camillus de Lellis (1550–1614), was a Catholic priest, founder of the Ministers of the Sick.
- Francis Caracciolo (1563–1608), was a Catholic priest, founder with Father Augustine Adorno of the Clerics Regular Minor.
- Humilis of Bisignano (1582–1637), was a Franciscan friar born in Bisignano.
- Joseph of Cupertino (1603–1663), was a Franciscan mystic. Also known as Joseph of Copertino.
- Bernard of Corleone (1605–1667), converted swordsman and saint from Sicily.
- Giuseppe Maria Tomasi (1649–1713), was a Cardinal, noted for his learning, humility, and zeal for reform.
- Francis Fasani (1681–1742), was a Franciscan, also called Francis of Lucera.
- Alphonsus Maria de' Liguori (1696–1787), doctor of the church, one of the chief 18th-century moral theologians.
- Ignatius of Laconi (1701–1781), was a "Franciscan mystic and confessor, also called Francis Ignatius Peis."
- Mary Frances of the Five Wounds (March 1715 – 1791), a saint, was born in Naples, Italy.
- Felix of Nicosia (November 1715 – 1787), a Capuchin friar, was known in his time for his gifts of charity and humility.
- Gerard Majella (1726–1755), was a religious. He is the patron of expectant mothers.
- Gaetano Errico (1791–1860), was a priest and founder of the Congregation of the Missionaries of the Sacred Hearts of Jesus and Mary.
- Caterina Volpicelli (1839–1894), was a nun, "foundress of the Servants of the Sacred Heart."
- Filippo Smaldone (1848–1923), was a priest of the archdiocese of Lecce, Italy; and founder of the Congregation of the Salesian Sisters of the Sacred Hearts.
- Annibale Maria di Francia (1851–1927), was a religious and founder of religious congregations.
- Giuseppe Moscati (1860–1927), was an influential physician. He gave his wages and skills to caring for the sick and the poor and was a model of piety and faith.
- Gaetano Catanoso (1879–1963), was a cleric who encouraged Marian and Eucharistic devotion and vocations to the priesthood.
- Pio of Pietrelcina (1887–1968), priest and saint of the Roman Catholic Church.
- Maria Gabriella Sagheddu (1914–1939), "is called the saint of unity because she offered her life in the cause of ecumenism."

== Scientists ==
- Trotula (fl. 11th – 12th centuries), was a physician, obstetrician, gynaecologist, health planner and experimenter, responsible for major advances in female medicine.
- Luca Gaurico (1475–1558), was "perhaps the most renowned astrologer of the first half of the sixteenth century."
- Bartolomeo Maranta (1500–1571), was a physician and botanist. He is remembered in the name of the prayer plant – Maranta leuconeura.
- Giovanni Filippo Ingrassia (1510–1580), was Professor of Anatomy and Medicine in Naples, and later in Palermo. He discovered the stapes in 1546.
- Aloysius Lilius (c. 1510 – 1576), was a medic and astronomer responsible for the Gregorian calendar.
- Giambattista della Porta (1535–1615), Renaissance scientist and polymath. His first and most internationally famous work was Magia Naturalis.
- Fabio Colonna (1567–1640), naturalist, was a member of the Accademia dei Lincei.
- Marco Aurelio Severino (1580–1656), wrote the "First Test of Surgical Pathology." He was also the first to include illustrations of pathological lesions in his books.
- Giovanni Battista Zupi (c. 1590 – 1650), astronomer who discovered that Mercury had orbital phases.
- Giovanni Battista Hodierna (1597–1660), was an astronomer, mathematician, and scientist at the court of the duke of Montechiaro.
- Giovanni Alfonso Borelli (1608–1679), was an extremely influential scientist and polymath.
- Agostino Scilla (1629–1700), was a painter, paleontologist, and geologist. He inaugurated "the modern scientific study of fossils."
- Paolo Boccone (1633–1704), was "one of the leading Sicilian naturalists of the time."
- Tommaso Campailla (April 1668 – 1740), physician. He fought syphilis rheumatism in a "modern" way, using the "guaiacum barrels" or "vapour stovens" that he had invented.
- Gjuro Baglivi (September 1668 – 1707), was a scientist, professor at the Sapienza in Rome.
- Leonardo Ximenes (1716–1786), physicist, astronomer, geographer and hydrographer from Trapani, founded the Ximenes Observatory in Florence in 1756.
- Vincenzo Petagna (1734–1810), was a "physician, entomologist, and professor of botany." The plant Petagnaea gussonei is named in his honour.
- Domenico Cotugno (1736–1822), "was a Neapolitan physician and was the first to provide descriptions of cerebrospinal fluid (CSF) and sciatica."
- Bernardino da Ucria (9 April 1739 – 1796), was a Franciscan friar with an interest in botany and the Linnean system of classification.
- Domenico Cirillo (10 April 1739 – 1799), was an eminent botanist and student of medicine from Naples.
- Alessandro Cagliostro (1743–1795), adventurer, magician, and alchemist. "One of the greatest occult figures of all time."
- Giuseppe Saverio Poli (1746–1825), was "one of the leading scientists of Naples."
- Tiberius Cavallo (1749–1809), was "one of the best known experimental scientists of his time."
- Joseph Forlenze (1757–1833), surgeon under the First French Empire, decreed "chirurgien oculiste of the lycees, the civil hospices and all the charitable institutions of the departments of the Empire".
- Guglielmo Gasparrini (January 1803 – 1866), was a botanist who is noted for his study on the cultivation of the sweet potato.
- Giovanni Spano (March 1803 – 1878), was "the most important Sardinian archaeologist and linguist of the 19th century."
- Luigi Palmieri (1807–1896), physicist and meteorologist, inventor of the mercury seismometer.
- Raffaele Piria (1814–1865), a chemist, was "the first to successfully synthesize salicylic acid." The active ingredient in aspirin.
- Ferdinando Palasciano (1815–1891), was a physician whose work is considered crucial to having helped lay the foundations of the International Red Cross.
- Filippo Parlatore (1816–1877), was born at Palermo; Director of the Royal Museum of Natural History at Florence and Professor of Botany.
- Agostino Todaro (1818–1892), was a lawyer and botanist at Palermo.
- Annibale de Gasparis (1819–1892), was an astronomer. He won the Gold Medal of the Royal Astronomical Society in 1851.
- Stanislao Cannizzaro (1826–1910), was an influential chemist. In 1853 he discovered the reaction known as Cannizzaro's reaction.
- Francesco Todaro (1839–1918), was an anatomist. He described a fibrous extension of the Eustachian valve, now referred to as the Tendon of Todaro.
- Emanuele Paternò (1847–1935), was a chemist, discoverer of the Paternò–Büchi reaction.
- Carlo Emery (1848–1925), was Professor of Zoology at the University of Cagliari in 1878 and later Professor of Zoology at the University of Bologna.
- Vincenzo Cerulli (1859–1927), was an astronomer. "He was especially known for his work on Mars and Venus, and his discovery of the minor planet 704 Interamnia."
- Giuseppe Oddo (1865–1954), was a chemist and co-discoverer of the Oddo–Harkins rule.
- Vincenzo Tiberio (1869–1915), physician and researcher, was a precursor of penicillin studies.
- Orso Mario Corbino (1876–1937), a renowned physicist who was a founder of the Rome School of Nuclear Physics. He discovered the Corbino effect.
- Gaetano Crocco (1877–1968), was a leading aeronautical scientist in the middle of the 20th century.
- Antonino Lo Surdo (1880–1949), was a physicist and co-discoverer of the Stark effect.
- Amedeo Maiuri (1886–1963), was a renowned archaeologist "famous for his excavations at Pompeii."
- Giuseppe Brotzu (1895–1976), was a pharmacologist and politician. He is very well known for his discovery of cephalosporin.
- Enrico Fermi (Note: Apulian from mother side.) (1901–1954), was a genius. Of significant note, since the 1980s, he has been frequently called the "last universal physicist."
- Ettore Majorana (1906–1938), "was a genius, a prodigy in arithmetic, a portent of insight and thinking power, the most profound and critical mind at the physics building."
- Renato Dulbecco (1914–2012), was a virologist who shared a Nobel Prize in 1975 for his role in drawing a link between genetic mutations and cancer.
- Antonino Zichichi (1929–2026), a theoretical physicist and emeritus professor at the University of Bologna.
- Michele Parrinello (born 1945), is a physicist. One of the fathers of the Car–Parrinello method.
- Silvio Micali (born 1954), is a theoretical computer scientist. He has received the Turing Award, the Gödel Prize, and the RSA Award (in encryption).

=== Mathematicians ===
- Barlaam of Seminara (c. 1290 – c. 1348), "bishop of Geraci, studied in Constantinople and wrote on computing, astronomy, the science of numbers, algebra, and Book II of Euclid."
- Giordano Vitale (1633–1711), was a mathematician. He is best known for his theorem on Saccheri quadrilaterals.
- Ernesto Cesàro (1859–1906), was a prolific mathematician and professor at the universities of Palermo and Naples.
- Giuseppe Lauricella (1867–1913), was an analyst and mathematical physicist.
- Francesco Paolo Cantelli (1875–1966), was a mathematician. He is remembered through the Borel–Cantelli lemma, the Glivenko–Cantelli theorem, and Cantelli's inequality.
- Michele Cipolla (1880–1947), was a mathematician, mainly specializing in number theory.
- Leonida Tonelli (April 1885 – 1946), mathematician; worked on the calculus of variations.
- Mauro Picone (May 1885 – 1977), was a mathematician. He is known for the Picone identity and for the Sturm-Picone comparison theorem.
- Giacomo Albanese (1890–1948), was a mathematician. In advanced abstract mathematics, the concept of albanese variety refers to him.
- Francesco Tricomi (1897–1978), was a professor in Torino and a prolific researcher in classical mathematical analysis.
- Renato Caccioppoli (1904–1959), was an outstanding mathematician who carried out seminal work on linear and nonlinear differential equations.
- Gaetano Fichera (1922–1996), was one of the great Italian masters of mathematics.
- Ennio De Giorgi (1928–1996), was a brilliant mathematician. He solved 19th Hilbert problem on the regularity of solutions of elliptic partial differential equations.
- Carlo Cercignani (1939–2010), was a well-known mathematician in the field of kinetic theory. He received the Humboldt Prize in 1994.
- Mariano Giaquinta (born 1947), is a mathematician. In 1990 he was awarded with Humboldt research award and in 2006 with the Amerio prize.

== Sculptors ==
- Nicola Pisano (c. 1220/1225 – c. 1284), also known as Nicholas of Apulia, was the founder of modern sculpture.
- Niccolò dell'Arca (c. 1435/1440 – 1494), was an early Renaissance sculptor, most probably of Apulian origin.
- Giovanni da Nola (1478–1559), was "one of the most important sculptors in the Italian High Renaissance."
- Girolamo Santacroce (c. 1502 – c. 1537), Neapolitan sculptor, architect and medallist, was active in Naples, where he produced statues, altars and funerary monuments.
- Gian Lorenzo Bernini (1598–1680), artistic polymath. He was "perhaps the greatest sculptor of the 17th century and an outstanding architect as well."
- Dionisio Lazzari (1617–1689), was a sculptor and architect from Naples.
- Giacomo Serpotta (1652–1732), was a master stucco sculptor.
- Gaetano Giulio Zumbo (1656–1701), "sculptor of the celebrated Plague waxworks, was the most enigmatic artist in the Florence of the last Medicis."
- Domenico Antonio Vaccaro (1678–1745), "was one of the leading Neapolitan sculptors of the first half of the 18th century."
- Giuseppe Sanmartino (1720–1793), arguably the finest sculptor of his time.
- Alfonso Balzico (1825–1901), was a famous sculptor. In 1900 he won the gold medal at the Exposition Universelle, Paris, with the statue Flavio Gioia.
- Vincenzo Ragusa (1841–1927), taught sculpture from 1876 to 1882, and introduced European fine arts to Japan.
- Vincenzo Gemito (1852–1929), was the greater sculptor of Neapolitan impressionism.
- Ettore Ximenes (1855–1926), was a renowned sculptor whose work was associated with Brazilian nationalism.
- Mario Rutelli (1859–1941), was a well-known sculptor who has made a number of works on display around Italy.
- Umberto Boccioni (1882–1916), was an influential futurist theoretician, painter, and sculptor.
- Francesco Messina (1900–1995), was one of the most important Italian sculptors of the 20th century.
- Costantino Nivola (1911–1988), was "a painter, designer, and sculptor" born in Orani who became famous especially in the United States.
- Emilio Greco (1913–1995), was a sculptor of bronze and marble figurative works, primarily female nudes and portraits.
- Pietro Consagra (1920–2005), was an abstract sculptor known for his works in iron and bronze.
- Arturo Di Modica (born 1941), is a sculptor. He is best known for his iconic sculpture, Charging Bull (also known as the Wall Street Bull).

== Writers and philosophers ==
See also Category:Writers from Sicily and Sardinian Literary Spring

- John Italus (fl. 11th century), was a Neoplatonic philosopher of Calabrian origin.
- Goffredo Malaterra (fl. 11th century), a Benedictin and historian, was the author of De rebus gestis Rogerii et Roberti, which chronicles the history of the Normans in Italy.
- Ibn Hamdis (c. 1056 – c. 1133), was the greatest Arab-Sicilian poet. He "considered himself a Sicilian."
- Joachim of Fiore (c. 1135 – 1202), mystic, theologian, biblical commentator, and philosopher of history. In 1196 he founded the order of San Giovanni in Fiore.
- Pietro della Vigna (c. 1190 – 1249), was a "jurist, poet, and man of letters." An exponent of the formal style of Latin prose called ars dictandi.
- Thomas of Celano (c. 1200 – c. 1265), was a Franciscan friar, poet, and hagiographical writer. He probably composed the sequence Dies Irae and its celebrated plainsong.
- Thomas Aquinas (1225–1274), genius, philosopher, and theologian. The major works of Aquinas include the Summa Theologica and the Summa contra Gentiles.
- Giacomo da Lentini (fl. 13th century), poet. He is traditionally credited with the invention of the sonnet.
- Antonio Beccadelli (1394–1471), was a scholar and poet born in Palermo, who was known for his fine Latin verse.
- Masuccio Salernitano (1410–1475), was a poet who wrote Il Novellino, a collection of fifty short stories.
- Iovianus Pontanus (1426–1503), was "a famous humanist and poet."
- Julius Pomponius Laetus (1428–1497), was a great writer, humanist, and founder of the Accademia Romana.
- Jacopo Sannazzaro (1456–1530), a "poet whose Arcadia was the first pastoral romance."
- Thomas Cajetan (1469–1534), "was the most renowned Dominican theologian and philosopher in the sixteenth century."
- Bernardino Telesio (1509–1588), philosopher. He was a leader in the Renaissance movement against medieval Aristotelianism.
- Isabella di Morra (c. 1520 – 1545/1546), poet, cited as a "precursor of Romantic poets".
- Lorenzo Scupoli (c. 1530 – 1610), was a writer, philosopher, and priest of the Theatine Congregation. He was the author of the great classic, The Spiritual Combat.
- Caesar Baronius (1538–1607), was an ecclesiastical historian, cardinal of the Roman Catholic Church. His best known work are his Annales Ecclesiastici.
- Antonio Veneziano (1543–1593), was the greatest poet of the Sicilian cinquecento.
- Torquato Tasso (1544–1595), a genius, was the "greatest Italian poet of the late Renaissance."
- Giordano Bruno (1548–1600), philosopher and polymath whose theories anticipated modern science.
- Giambattista Basile (1566–1632), soldier, public official, poet, and short-story writer.
- Tommaso Campanella (1568–1639), was a philosopher, polymath, and child prodigy. He is best remembered for his socialistic work The City of the Sun.
- Giambattista Marino (1569–1625), "poet, founder of the school of Marinism (later Secentismo), which dominated 17th-century Italian poetry."
- Lucilio Vanini (1585–1619), a famous philosopher and free-thinker who was burnt at the stake for the atheism of his publications.
- Gemelli Careri (1651–1725), was a famous writer and traveler. Author of Giro Del Mondo (1699).
- Giovanni Vincenzo Gravina (1664–1718), was "an eminent jurist and writer, born at Roggiano [Gravina], in Calabria."
- Giambattista Vico (1668–1744), was a philosopher and polymath who is recognized today as a forerunner of cultural anthropology, or ethnology.
- Raimondo di Sangro (1710–1771), was a writer, polymath, and Grand Master of Naples's first Masonic lodge.
- Antonio Genovesi (1713–1769), was a priest, professor of philosophy, and pioneer in ethical studies and economic theory.
- Giovanni Meli (1740–1815), was a poet and man of letters. He is "commonly considered one of the most important dialect poets of eighteenth-century Italy."
- Francesco Mario Pagano (1748–1799), politician, jurist and writer, was professor of law at the university of Naples.
- Pasquale Galluppi (1770–1846), was an epistemologist and moral philosopher, was born in Tropea.
- Gabriele Rossetti (1783–1854), was a patriotic poet, commentator on Dante. Professor of Italian at King's College London, 1831–47.
- Michele Amari (1806–1889), was a patriot, historian and orientalist, author of Storia dei Musulmani di Sicilia (History of the Muslims of Sicily) 1854.
- Girolamo de Rada (1814–1903), was a poet and writer, founding father of Arbëresh literature and culture.
- Ferdinando Petruccelli della Gattina (1815–1890), was a revolutionary and writer. One of the greatest journalists of the 19th century and a pioneer of modern journalism.
- Francesco de Sanctis (March 1817 – 1883), critic, educator, and legislator. He was the foremost Italian literary historian of the 19th century.
- Bertrando Spaventa (June 1817 – 1883), historian of philosophy, was a major force in the tradition of Italian Hegelianism.
- Goffredo Mameli (1827–1849), was a poet and patriot of the Risorgimento. Author of the Italian national anthem, Inno di Mameli, popularly known as Il Canto degli Italiani.
- Luigi Capuana (1839–1915), novelist, journalist, critic, and the leading theorist of Italian verismo.
- Giovanni Verga (1840–1922), novelist, short-story writer, and playwright, most important of the Italian verismo school of novelists.
- Salvatore Farina (1846–1918), was a novelist. He enjoyed great popularity in his lifetime, to the point that many critics referred to him as the "Italian Charles Dickens."
- Errico Malatesta (1853–1932), was an anarchist writer and revolutionary. His most important works are Anarchy and Fra Contadini (Between peasants).
- Matilde Serao (1856–1927), was a novelist, journalist and newspaper proprietor who published around 40 novels focussing on the lives of women, including in the Verismo style.
- Gaetano Mosca (1858–1941), was a jurist, philosopher, and proponent of the theory of élite domination.
- Nicola Zingarelli (1860–1935), was a philologist and man of letters. The founder of the Zingarelli Italian dictionary.
- Federico De Roberto (1861–1927), was a renowned verismo writer. His best-known work is I Vicerè (The Viceroys) 1894.
- Gabriele D'Annunzio (1863–1938), "poet, novelist, dramatist, short-story writer, journalist, military hero, and political leader."
- Benedetto Croce (1866–1952), "historian, humanist, and foremost Italian philosopher of the first half of the 20th century."
- Luigi Pirandello (1867–1936), playwright, novelist, and short-story writer, winner of the 1934 Nobel Prize for Literature.
- Grazia Deledda (1871–1936), novelist and short-story writer. She was awarded the Nobel Prize for Literature in 1926.
- Gaetano Salvemini (1873–1957), was a writer, historian, and politician who fought for universal suffrage and the uplift of the Italian South.
- Giovanni Gentile (1875–1944), major figure in Italian idealist philosophy, politician, educator, and editor.
- Emilio Lussu (1890–1975), was a writer and politician, minister in the first Republican governments.
- Antonio Gramsci (1891–1937), a writer and polymath. He was one of the most important Marxist thinkers in the 20th century.
- Corrado Alvaro (1895–1956), novelist and journalist whose works investigated the social and political pressures of life in the 20th century.
- Giuseppe Tomasi di Lampedusa (1896–1957), novelist. Internationally renowned for his work, The Leopard, published posthumously in 1958.
- Julius Evola (1898–1974), was a philosopher and polymath. The historian Mircea Eliade described him as "one of the most interesting minds of the war [WW I] generation."
- Leonida Repaci (1898–1985), novelist. He won the Bagutta Prize in 1933 and was one of the originators of the Viareggio Prize.
- Ignazio Silone (1900–1978), novelist, short-story writer, and political leader. Internationally known for his novel Fontamara.
- Nicola Abbagnano (1901–1990), a famous philosopher. He "was the first and most important Italian existentialist."
- Salvatore Quasimodo (1901–1968), poet, critic, and translator. He received the Nobel Prize for Literature in 1959.
- Lanza del Vasto (1901–1981), was a writer, philosopher, and follower of Gandhi's movement for non-violence.
- Vitaliano Brancati (1907–1954), was a writer of ironic and sometimes erotic novels.
- Elio Vittorini (1908–1966), novelist, translator, and critic. Conversations in Sicily, which clearly expresses his antifascist feelings, is his most important novel.
- Tommaso Landolfi (1908–1979), was a writer of fiction and literary critic.
- Alfonso Gatto (1909–1976), renowned poet who was also an editor, journalist, and cultural broadcaster.
- Elsa Morante (1912–1985), was one of the most important novelists of the postwar period, author of the bestseller La storia.
- Gesualdo Bufalino (1920–1996), was a "novelist who, saw his literary career blossom after his retirement from teaching in 1976."
- Leonardo Sciascia (1921–1989), writer noted for his metaphysical examinations of political corruption and arbitrary power.
- Italo Calvino (1923–1985), journalist, short-story writer, and novelist. One of the most important Italian fiction writers in the 20th century.
- Andrea Camilleri (1925–2019), popular novelist who was formerly a theatre director and television producer in Rome.
- Luciano De Crescenzo (1928–2019), was one of the most popular Neapolitan writers.
- Vincenzo Consolo (1933–2012), was one of the most important Italian writers of the 20th century.
- Gavino Ledda (born 1938), is a Sardinian shepherd and self-taught student who became a famous writer.
- Giulio Angioni (born 1939), writer and anthropologist. He is the author of about twenty books of fiction and a dozen volumes of essays in anthropology.
- Erri De Luca (born 1950), is one of the most important contemporary Italian writers.
- Caterina Davinio (born 1957), is a poet, writer, and new media artist. Initiator of Italian Net-poetry in 1998.

== Other notables ==
- Claudio Acquaviva (1543–1615), was a Jesuit priest, fifth general of the Society of Jesus, 1581–1615.
- Carlo Pellegrini (1839–1889), famous Victorian caricaturist, who lived in England from 1864 until his death.
- Diomede Falconio (1842–1917), Cardinal, apostolic delegate to the United States, was born 20 September 1842, in Pescocostanzo, Abruzzi.
- Giovanni Passannante (1849–1910), was an anarchist who attempted to assassinate King Umberto I of Italy.
- Benito Jacovitti (1923–1997), was a comic artist, probably best known for his Wild West humor series Cocco Bill.
- Eugenio Barba (born 1936), is a theatre director, an actor trainer and a writer.
- Achille Bonito Oliva (born 1939), is an art historian, critic, and founder of the Transavantgarde artistic movement.
- Sergio Marchionne (born 1952), is chief executive officer of Fiat S.p.A. and of Fiat Group Automobiles S.p.A.
- Antonio Serra (born 1963), comics writer. He is one of the creators of Nathan Never.
- Floria Sigismondi (born 1965), is a photographer and director.
- Luca Parmitano (born 1976), is a European Space Agency (ESA) astronaut and a Major of the Italian Air Force.

== See also ==
- List of central Italians
- List of people from Sicily
- List of people from Calabria
- List of people from Sardinia
