= Lefschetz hyperplane theorem =

Theorem in algebraic geometry

In mathematics, specifically in algebraic geometry and algebraic topology, the Lefschetz hyperplane theorem is a precise statement of certain relations between the shape of an algebraic variety and the shape of its subvarieties. More precisely, the theorem says that for a variety X embedded in projective space and a hyperplane section Y, the homology, cohomology, and homotopy groups of X determine those of Y. A result of this kind was first stated by Solomon Lefschetz for homology groups of complex algebraic varieties. Similar results have since been found for homotopy groups, in positive characteristic, and in other homology and cohomology theories.

A far-reaching generalization of the hard Lefschetz theorem is given by the decomposition theorem.

== The Lefschetz hyperplane theorem for complex projective varieties ==
Let $X$ be an $n$-dimensional complex projective algebraic variety in $\mathbb{C}\mathbf{P}^N$, and let $Y$ be a hyperplane section of $X$ such that $U=X\setminus Y$ is smooth. The Lefschetz theorem refers to any of the following statements:

1. The natural map $H_k(Y,\mathbb{Z})\rightarrow H_k(X,\mathbb{Z})$ in singular homology is an isomorphism for $k<n-1$ and is surjective for $k=n-1$.
2. The natural map $H^k(X,\mathbb{Z})\rightarrow H^k(Y,\mathbb{Z})$ in singular cohomology is an isomorphism for $k<n-1$ and is injective for $k=n-1$.
3. The natural map $\pi_k(Y)\rightarrow \pi_k(X)$ is an isomorphism for $k<n-1$ and is surjective for $k=n-1$.

Using a long exact sequence, one can show that each of these statements is equivalent to a vanishing theorem for certain relative topological invariants. In order, these are:

1. The relative singular homology groups $H_k(X,Y;\mathbb{Z})$ are zero for $k \leq n-1$.
2. The relative singular cohomology groups $H^k(X,Y;\mathbb{Z})$ are zero for $k \leq n-1$.
3. The relative homotopy groups $\pi_k(X,Y)$ are zero for $k \leq n-1$.

=== Lefschetz's proof ===
Solomon Lefschetz used his idea of a Lefschetz pencil to prove the theorem. Rather than considering the hyperplane section $Y$ alone, he put it into a family of hyperplane sections $Y_t$, where $Y=Y_0$. Because a generic hyperplane section is smooth, all but a finite number of $Y_t$ are smooth varieties. After removing these points from the $t$-plane and making an additional finite number of slits, the resulting family of hyperplane sections is topologically trivial. That is, it is a product of a generic $Y_t$ with an open subset of the $t$-plane. $X$, therefore, can be understood if one understands how hyperplane sections are identified across the slits and at the singular points. Away from the singular points, the identification can be described inductively. At the singular points, the Morse lemma implies that there is a choice of coordinate system for $X$ of a particularly simple form. This coordinate system can be used to prove the theorem directly.

=== Andreotti and Frankel's proof ===
Aldo Andreotti and Theodore Frankel recognized that Lefschetz's theorem could be recast using Morse theory. Here the parameter $t$ plays the role of a Morse function. The basic tool in this approach is the Andreotti–Frankel theorem, which states that a complex affine variety of complex dimension $n$ (and thus real dimension $2n$) has the homotopy type of a CW-complex of (real) dimension $n$. This implies that the relative homology groups of $Y$ in $X$ are trivial in degree less than $n$. The long exact sequence of relative homology then gives the theorem.

=== Thom's and Bott's proofs ===
Neither Lefschetz's proof nor Andreotti and Frankel's proof directly imply the Lefschetz hyperplane theorem for homotopy groups. An approach that does was found by René Thom no later than 1957 and was simplified and published by Raoul Bott in 1959. Thom and Bott interpret $Y$ as the vanishing locus in $X$ of a section of a line bundle. An application of Morse theory to this section implies that $X$ can be constructed from $Y$ by adjoining cells of dimension $n$ or more. From this, it follows that the relative homology and homotopy groups of $Y$ in $X$ are concentrated in degrees $n$ and higher, which yields the theorem.

=== Kodaira and Spencer's proof for Hodge groups ===
Kunihiko Kodaira and Donald C. Spencer found that under certain restrictions, it is possible to prove a Lefschetz-type theorem for the Hodge groups $H^{p,q}$. Specifically, assume that $Y$ is smooth and that the line bundle $\mathcal{O}_X(Y)$ is ample. Then the restriction map $H^{p,q}(X)\to H^{p,q}(Y)$ is an isomorphism if $p+q<n-1$ and is injective if $p+q=n-1$. By Hodge theory, these cohomology groups are equal to the sheaf cohomology groups $H^q(X, \textstyle\bigwedge^p\Omega_X)$ and $H^q(Y, \textstyle\bigwedge^p\Omega_Y)$. Therefore, the theorem follows from applying the Akizuki–Nakano vanishing theorem to $H^q(X, \textstyle\bigwedge^p\Omega_X|_Y)$ and using a long exact sequence.

Combining this proof with the universal coefficient theorem nearly yields the usual Lefschetz theorem for cohomology with coefficients in any field of characteristic zero. It is, however, slightly weaker because of the additional assumptions on $Y$.

=== Artin and Grothendieck's proof for constructible sheaves ===
Michael Artin and Alexander Grothendieck found a generalization of the Lefschetz hyperplane theorem to the case where the coefficients of the cohomology lie not in a field but instead in a constructible sheaf. They prove that for a constructible sheaf $\mathcal{F}$ on an affine variety $U$, the cohomology groups $H^k(U,\mathcal{F})$ vanish whenever $k>n$.

== The Lefschetz theorem in other cohomology theories ==
The motivation behind Artin and Grothendieck's proof for constructible sheaves was to give a proof that could be adapted to the setting of étale and $\ell$-adic cohomology. Up to some restrictions on the constructible sheaf, the Lefschetz theorem remains true for constructible sheaves in positive characteristic.

The theorem can also be generalized to intersection homology. In this setting, the theorem holds for highly singular spaces.

A Lefschetz-type theorem also holds for Picard groups.

== Hard Lefschetz theorem ==
Let $X$ be a $n$-dimensional non-singular complex projective variety in $\mathbb{C}\mathbf{P}^N$. Then in the cohomology ring of $X$, the $k$-fold product with the cohomology class of a hyperplane gives an isomorphism between $H^{n - k}(X)$ and $H^{n + k}(X)$.

This is the hard Lefschetz theorem, christened in French by Grothendieck more colloquially as the Théorème de Lefschetz vache. It immediately implies the injectivity part of the Lefschetz hyperplane theorem.

The hard Lefschetz theorem in fact holds for any compact Kähler manifold, with the isomorphism in de Rham cohomology given by multiplication by a power of the class of the Kähler form. It can fail for non-Kähler manifolds: for example, Hopf surfaces have vanishing second cohomology groups, so there is no analogue of the second cohomology class of a hyperplane section.

The hard Lefschetz theorem was proven for $\ell$-adic cohomology of smooth projective varieties over algebraically closed fields of positive characteristic by Pierre Deligne (1980).

== Bibliography ==
- Andreotti, Aldo; Frankel, Theodore (1959), "The Lefschetz theorem on hyperplane sections", Annals of Mathematics, Second Series, 69 (3): 713–717, doi:10.2307/1970034, ISSN 0003-486X, JSTOR 1970034, MR 0177422
- Beauville, Arnaud, The Hodge Conjecture, CiteSeerX 10.1.1.74.2423
- Bott, Raoul (1959), "On a theorem of Lefschetz", Michigan Mathematical Journal, 6 (3): 211–216, doi:10.1307/mmj/1028998225, MR 0215323
- Deligne, Pierre (1980), "La conjecture de Weil. II", Publications Mathématiques de l'IHÉS, 52 (52): 137–252, doi:10.1007/BF02684780, ISSN 1618-1913, MR 0601520, S2CID 189769469
- Griffiths, Phillip; Spencer, Donald C.; Whitehead, George W. (1992), "Solomon Lefschetz", in National Academy of Sciences, Office of the Home Secretary (ed.), Biographical Memoirs, vol. 61, The National Academies Press, ISBN 978-0-309-04746-3
- Lazarsfeld, Robert (2004), Positivity in algebraic geometry. I, Ergebnisse der Mathematik und ihrer Grenzgebiete. 3. Folge. A Series of Modern Surveys in Mathematics [Results in Mathematics and Related Areas. 3rd Series. A Series of Modern Surveys in Mathematics], vol. 48, Berlin, New York: Springer-Verlag, doi:10.1007/978-3-642-18808-4, ISBN 978-3-540-22533-1, MR 2095471
- Lefschetz, Solomon (1924), L'Analysis situs et la géométrie algébrique, Collection de Monographies publiée sous la Direction de M. Émile Borel (in French), Paris: Gauthier-Villars Reprinted in Lefschetz, Solomon (1971), Selected papers, New York: Chelsea Publishing Co., ISBN 978-0-8284-0234-7, MR 0299447
- Milnor, John Willard (1963), Morse theory, Annals of Mathematics Studies, No. 51, Princeton University Press, MR 0163331
- Sabbah, Claude (2001), Théorie de Hodge et théorème de Lefschetz « difficile » (PDF), archived from the original (PDF) on 2004-07-07
- Voisin, Claire (2003), Hodge theory and complex algebraic geometry. II, Cambridge Studies in Advanced Mathematics, vol. 77, Cambridge University Press, doi:10.1017/CBO9780511615177, ISBN 978-0-521-80283-3, MR 1997577
