= Frankel conjecture =

In the mathematical fields of differential geometry and algebraic geometry, the Frankel conjecture was a problem posed by Theodore Frankel in 1961. It was resolved in 1979 by Shigefumi Mori, and by Yum-Tong Siu and Shing-Tung Yau.

In its differential-geometric formulation, as proved by both Mori and by Siu and Yau, the result states that if a closed Kähler manifold has positive bisectional curvature, then it must be biholomorphic to complex projective space. In this way, it can be viewed as an analogue of the sphere theorem in Riemannian geometry, which (in a weak form) states that if a closed and simply-connected Riemannian manifold has positive curvature operator, then it must be diffeomorphic to a sphere. This formulation was extended by Ngaiming Mok to the following statement:

Let (M, g) be a closed Kähler manifold of nonnegative holomorphic bisectional curvature. Then the universal cover of M, with its natural metric, is biholomorphically isometric to the metric product of complex Euclidean space, with some number of irreducible closed hermitian symmetric spaces with rank larger than one, with the product of some number of complex projective spaces, each of which has a Kähler metric of nonnegative holomorphic bisectional curvature.

In its algebro-geometric formulation, as proved by Mori but not by Siu and Yau, the result states that if M is an irreducible and nonsingular projective variety, defined over an algebraically closed field k, which has ample tangent bundle, then M must be isomorphic to the projective space defined over k. This version is known as the Hartshorne conjecture, after Robin Hartshorne.
