= Lucio Caracciolo, Duke of Roccaromana =

Italian general

Lucio Caracciolo, Duca di Roccoromana
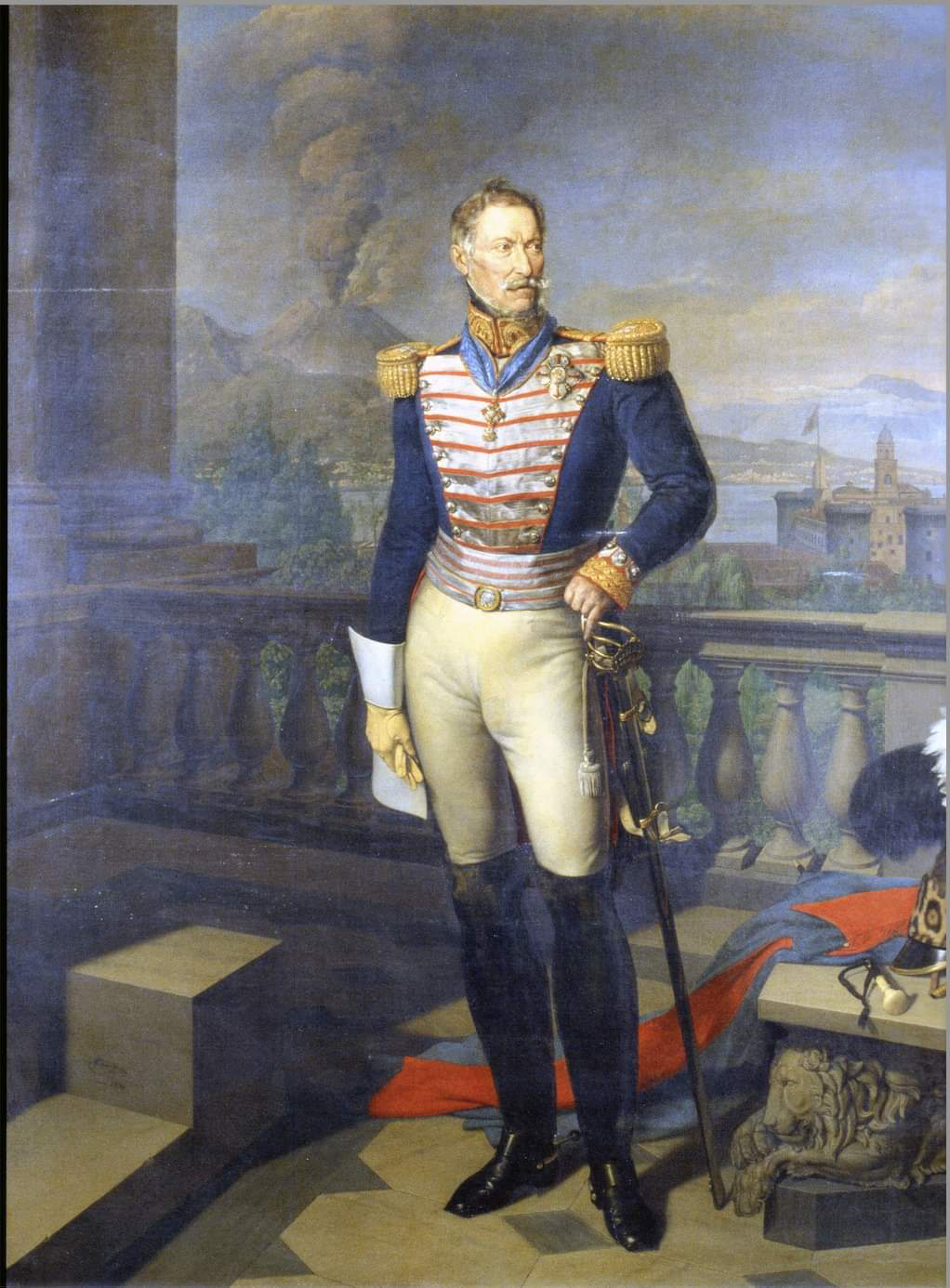
- Portrait by Gaetano Forte, 1834.
- Born: 1771; Naples
- Died: 9 August 1836; Naples

Lucio Caracciolo, Duke of Roccoromana (1771 - 1836) was a Neapolitan aristocrat and general who was a distinguished member of the Courts of both Ferdinand IV and Joachim Murat.

In 1808 he was made colonel of a regiment of Veliti a cavallo in the army of the Napoleonic Kingdom of Naples. In 1810, a French Colonel Durand seeking to reassign several of the best cavalrymen in the Duke's regiment to a new regiment of Cuirassiers Durand had been ordered to form, the Duke felt himself affronted at having his men stolen and challenged Durand to a duel over the transfer. The two men met on horseback in full uniform and charged each other with sabres twice before Roccaromana's blade cut a wound along his opponent's arm and the affair was ended in the Duke's favour. In 1812, he was appointed by Murat to be his Grand Equerry. He accompanied his king on the Russian Campaign where, during the retreat, he lost all fingers on his left hand through frostbite. Having driven off an attack of cossacks, Roccaromana and his cavalry formed for a time part of Napoleon's escort as the Emperor was taken in a sleigh back to Vilna ahead of the main army. He was present at Battle of Tolentino in 1815, where his only son, Ernesto, then aged twenty-two, was killed before him and Murat's army totally defeated.

With the restoration of the Bourbon Ferdinand IV he was not punished for his loyalty to Murat's regime, and retained his favoured position at the royal court. He received the Royal Order of Saint George and upon the succession of Ferdinand II to the throne of the Two Sicilies he became Captain of the Royal Guard.

Having become acquainted with him during her Grand Tour in the late 1820s, the Countess of Blessington wrote of the now near sixty year old Duke that, at dinner, he "is full of anecdotes, and recounts them with a peculiar grace and vivacity: a better specimen of an Italian gentlemen could not be found; well-informed, dignified yet lively, and with a profound deference in his manner towards women, that reminds one of the days of chivalry." Adding that, despite his advancing age, the Duke's lively bearing and military manner nevertheless "give him the appearance of being at least twenty years younger. In his youth he was considered the flower of the Neapolitan nobility."
