= Zingarelli =

Italian dictionary

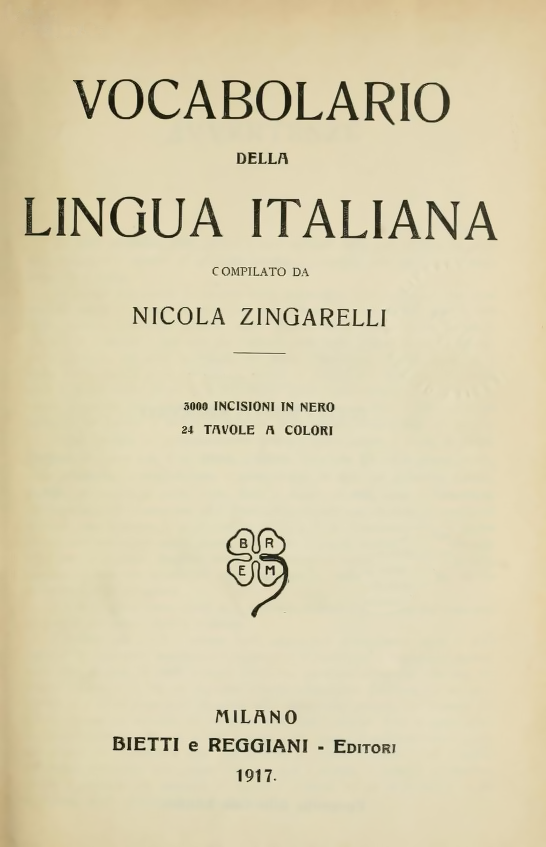
- Language: Italian
- Genre: Dictionary
- Publisher: Zanichelli
- Publication date: 1917

Zingarelli is a modern Italian monolingual dictionary.

Described as a Vocabolario della Lingua Italiana di Nicola Zingarelli, it is published annually by the Zanichelli publishing house.

The first edition is dated 1917.
