= Nicola Zingarelli =

Italian philologist

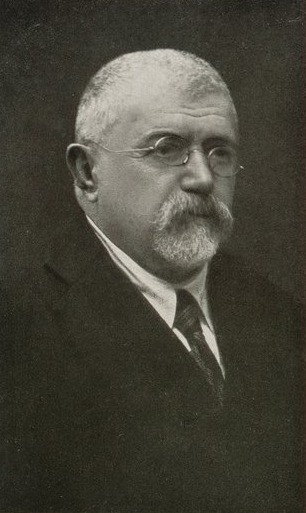
Nicola Zingarelli.

Nicola Zingarelli (Italian pronunciation: [niˈkɔːla ddziŋɡaˈrɛlli]; August 28, 1860 – June 6, 1935) was an Italian philologist, the founder of the Zingarelli Italian dictionary.

He was born in Cerignola (Apulia) and died in Milan.
