= Andreotti–Grauert theorem =

Theorem

In mathematics, the Andreotti–Grauert theorem, introduced by Andreotti and Grauert (1962), gives conditions for cohomology groups of coherent sheaves over complex manifolds to vanish or to be finite-dimensional.

== Statement ==
Let X be a (not necessarily reduced) complex analytic space, and $\mathcal{F}$ a coherent analytic sheaf over X. Then,

- $\rm{dim}_{\mathbb{C}} \; H^i (X, \mathcal{F}) < \infty$ for $i \geq q$ (resp. $i < \rm{codh} \; (\mathcal{F}) - q$), if X is q-pseudoconvex (resp. q-pseudoconcave). (finiteness)
- $H^i (X, \mathcal{F}) = 0$ for $i \geq q$, if X is q-complete. (vanish)
