= Edoardo Vesentini =

Italian mathematician and politician (1928–2020)

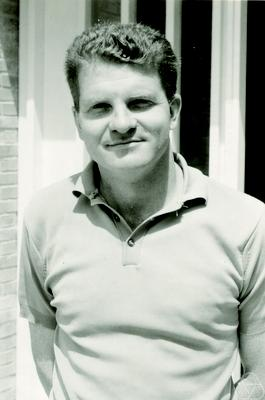
Edoardo Vesentini in 1967

Edoardo Vesentini (31 May 1928 – 28 March 2020) was an Italian mathematician and politician who introduced the Andreotti–Vesentini theorem. He was awarded the Caccioppoli Prize in 1962.

He was elected a member of the Academia Europaea in 1989.

Vasentini was born in Rome, and died on 28 March 2020, aged 91.
