= Andreotti–Vesentini theorem =

Certain cohomology groups of coherent sheaves are separated

In mathematics, the Andreotti–Vesentini separation theorem, introduced by Aldo Andreotti and Edoardo Vesentini (1965, 1965b) states that certain cohomology groups of coherent sheaves are separated.
