= Andreotti–Frankel theorem =

Mathematical theorem of complex manifolds

In mathematics, the Andreotti–Frankel theorem, introduced by Aldo Andreotti and Theodore Frankel (1959), states that if $V$ is a smooth, complex affine variety of complex dimension $n$ or, more generally, if $V$ is any Stein manifold of dimension $n$, then $V$ admits a Morse function with critical points of index at most n, and so $V$ is homotopy equivalent to a CW complex of real dimension at most n.

Consequently, if $V \subseteq \C^r$ is a closed connected complex submanifold of complex dimension $n$, then $V$ has the homotopy type of a CW complex of real dimension $\le n$. Therefore

$$H^i(V; \Z)=0,\text{ for }i>n$$

and

$$H_i(V; \Z)=0,\text{ for }i>n.$$

This theorem applies in particular to any smooth, complex affine variety of dimension $n$.
