= List of people from Sicily =

Sicily is the largest region in Italy in terms of area, with a population of over five million and has contributed many famous names to all walks of life. Geographically, it is the largest and most populated island in the Mediterranean Sea.

This list includes notable natives of Sicily and its predecessor states, as well as those who were born elsewhere but spent a large part of their active life in Sicily. People of Sicilian heritage and descent are in a separate section of this article. The Sicilian-Americans have a specific list.

== Rulers, monarchs and warriors ==
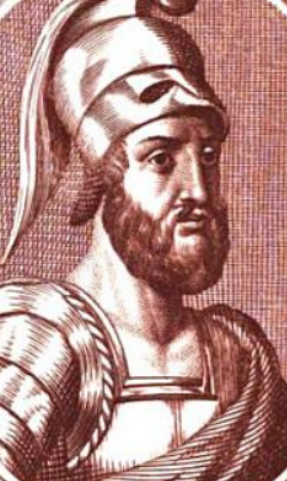
Hermocrates, Syracusan general during the Peloponnesian War.

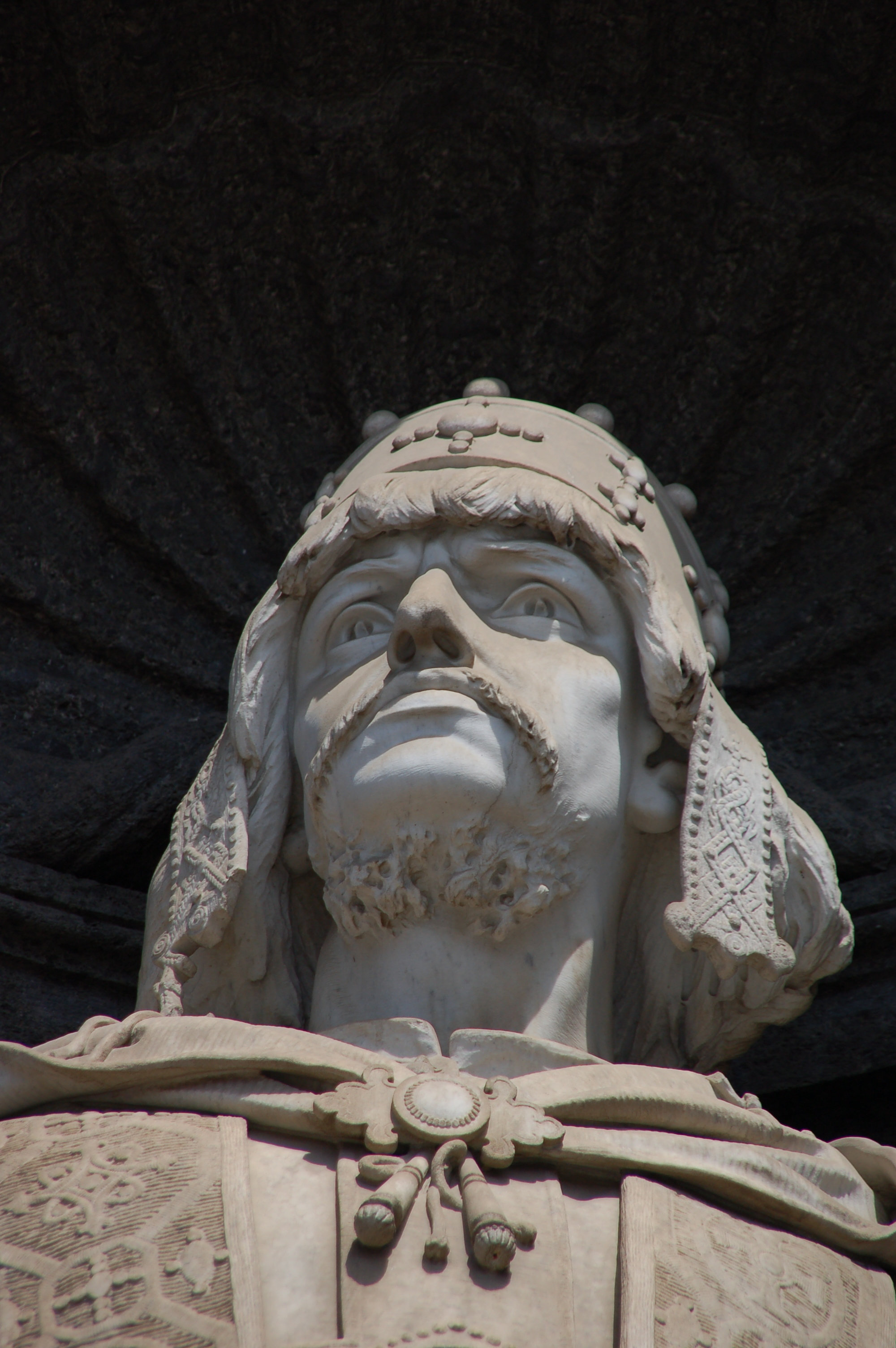
The Siculo-Norman Roger II, first king of Sicily. Crowned in the Palermo Cathedral in 1130, he founded a kingdom lasted 686 years.

- Phalaris (died 555 or 554 BC), tyrant of Akragas
- Theron (c. 535–472 BC), tyrant of Akragas
- Diocles of Syracuse (5th century BC), legislator and military leader
- Gelo (died 478 BC), tyrant of Gela and Syracuse
- Hiero I (died 467 or 466), tyrant of Gela and Syracuse
- Ducetius (died 440 BC), king of the Sicels
- Dionysius I (432 – 367 BC), tyrant of Syracuse
- Dion (408 – 354 BC), tyrant of Syracuse, friend of Plato
- Hermocrates (died 407 BC), Syracusan general
- Charondas (4th century), lawgiver
- Dionysius II (397 – 343 BC), tyrant of Syracuse
- Timoleon (411 – 337 BC), tyrant of Syracuse
- Agathocles (361 – 289 BC), tyrant of Syracuse
- Hicetas of Leontini (died 338 BC), tyrant of Leontini
- Hiero II (c. 308–c. 215 BC), tyrant of Syracuse
- Antander (4th century BC–3rd century BC), strategos
- Epicydes (3rd century BC), tyrant of Syracuse
- Lanassa (3rd century BC), queen consort of Epirus and Macedon
- Hieronymus, (231–214 BC), tyrant of Syracuse
- Euphemius (9th century AD), admiral
- al-Hasan al-Kalbi (r. 948 – 964 AD), founder of the Emirate of Sicily
- Jawhar al-Siqilli (966–992), general of the Fatimid Caliphate
- Roger I (1031–1101), founder of the County of Sicily
- Felicia (1078–1102), queen consort of Hungary
- Roger II (1095–1154), king of Sicily
- William I (1131–1166), king of Sicily
- William II (1155–1189), king of Sicily
- Tancred (1138–1194), king of Sicily
- William III (1186–1198), king of Sicily
- Constance I (1154–1198), queen of Sicily, Holy Roman Empress
- Frederick II (1194–1250), king of Sicily, Holy Roman Emperor
- Henry VII (1211–1242), king of Sicily and Germany
- Manfred (1232–1266), king of Sicily
- Constance II (1249–1302), queen consort of Aragon and Sicily
- Frederick III (1272–1337), king of Sicily
- Peter II (1305–1342), king of Sicily
- Constance (1305–1344), queen consort of Jerusalem and Cyprus and Armenia
- Eleanor (1325–1375), queen consort of Aragon
- Louis (1338–1355), king of Sicily
- Frederick IV (1341–1377), king of Sicily
- Maria (1363–1401), queen of Sicily
- Costanza Chiaramonte (1377–1423), queen consort of Naples
- Maria Christina of the Two Sicilies (1806–1878), queen of Spain
- Ferdinand II (1810–1859), king of the Two Sicilies
- Louise of Orléans (1812–1850), queen consort of Leopold I of Belgium

== Religious figures ==
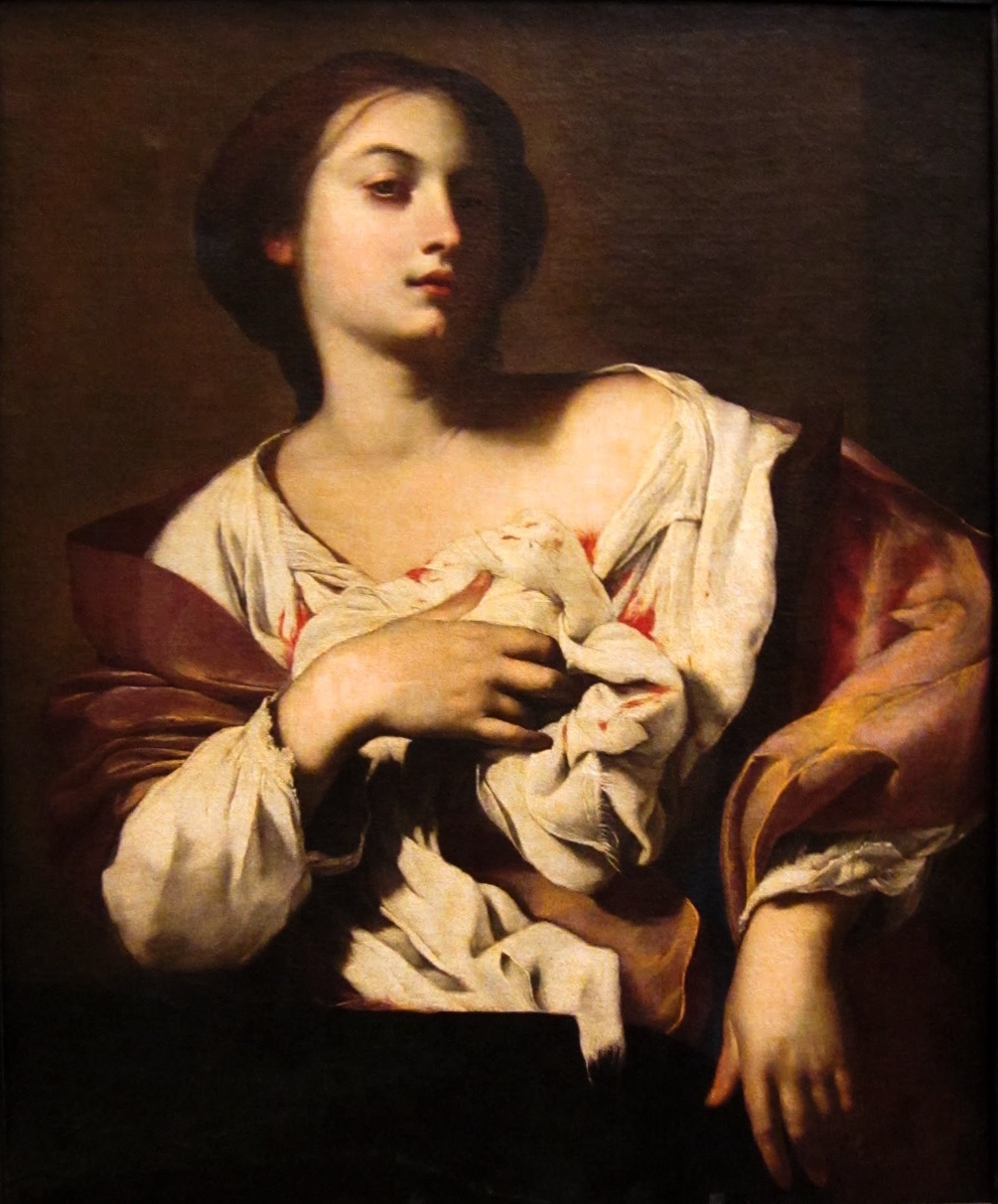
Saint Agatha, painting of Francesco Guarino (1637), Museo di Capodimonte, Naples.

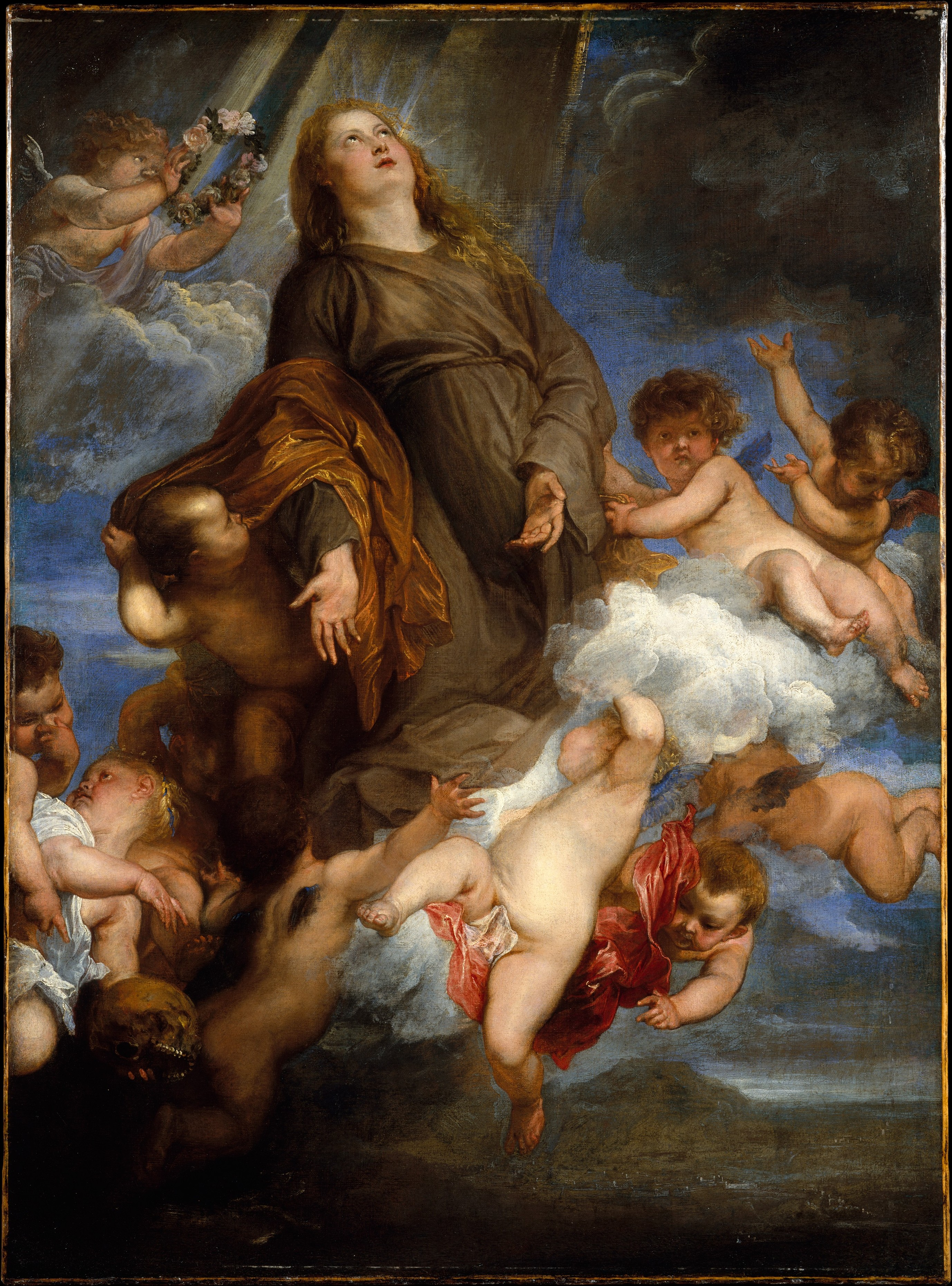
Saint Rosalie Interceding for the Plague–Stricken of Palermo, painting of Anthony van Dyck (1624), Metropolitan Museum of Art, New York City.

- Pantaenus (died 200 AD), theologian, saint
- Agatha of Catania (231–251 AD), martyr and saint
- Lucy of Syracuse (283–304 AD), martyr and saint
- Saint Vitus (c. 290–c. 303 AD), martyr and saint
- Euplius (died 304 AD), martyr and saint
- Bassianus of Lodi (c. 320– c. 409), bishop and saint
- Mamilian of Palermo (died 460), bishop and saint
- Olivia of Palermo (448–463), martyr and saint
- Pope Agatho (575–681), Pope from 678 to his death, saint
- Pope Leo II (611–683), Pope from 682 to his death, saint
- Pope Sergius I (650–701), Pope from 687 to his death, saint
- Pope Stephen III (723–772), Pope from 768 to his death
- Methodios I (788/800–847), Ecumenical Patriarch of Constantinople and saint
- Leo Luke of Corleone (815–915), monk and saint
- Joseph the Hymnographer (816–886), monk and saint
- Elias of Enna (822 or 823–903), monk and saint
- Vitalis of Castronovo (900–994), monk and abbot
- Symeon of Trier (980/990–1035), monk and saint
- Filarete of Calabria (c. 1020–1070), monk and saint
- John Theristus (1049–1129), monk and saint
- Rosalia of Palermo (1130–1166), hermit and saint
- Albert of Trapani (1240–1307), friar and saint
- Agostino Novello (1240–1309), Augustinian friar, scholar and blessed
- Nicolò de' Tudeschi "Panormitanus", (1386–1445), canonist, pseudocardinal
- Pietro Geremia (1399–1452), Dominican preacher and blessed
- Eustochia Smeralda Calafato (1434–1485), Franciscan hermitess and saint
- Luigi Rabatà (1443–1490), Carmelite priest and blessed
- Benedict the Moor (1526–1589), friar and saint
- Giordano Ansaloni (1598–1634), Dominican missionary and saint
- Bernard of Corleone (1605–1667), friar and saint
- Prospero Intorcetta (1626–1696), Jesuit missionary
- Giuseppe Maria Tomasi (1649–1713), Theatine priest, cardinal and saint
- Giovanni Battista Sidotti (1668–1714), priest, missionary
- Felix of Nicosia (1715–1787), Capuchin friar and saint
- Giacomo Cusmano (1834–1888), priest and blessed
- Mariano Rampolla (1843–1913), cardinal secretary of state
- Annibale Maria di Francia (1851–1927), priest and saint
- Carolina Santocanale (1852–1923), nun and blessed
- Maria Crocifissa Curcio (1877–1957), Carmelite nun and blessed
- Gabriele Allegra (1907–1976), Franciscan missionary, translator and blessed
- Giuseppina Suriano (1915–1950), Catholic activist and blessed
- Salvatore Pappalardo (1918–2006), archbishop and cardinal
- Francesco Spoto (1924–1964), priest, missionary and blessed
- Pino Puglisi (1937–1993), priest and blessed

== Philosophers and scientists ==
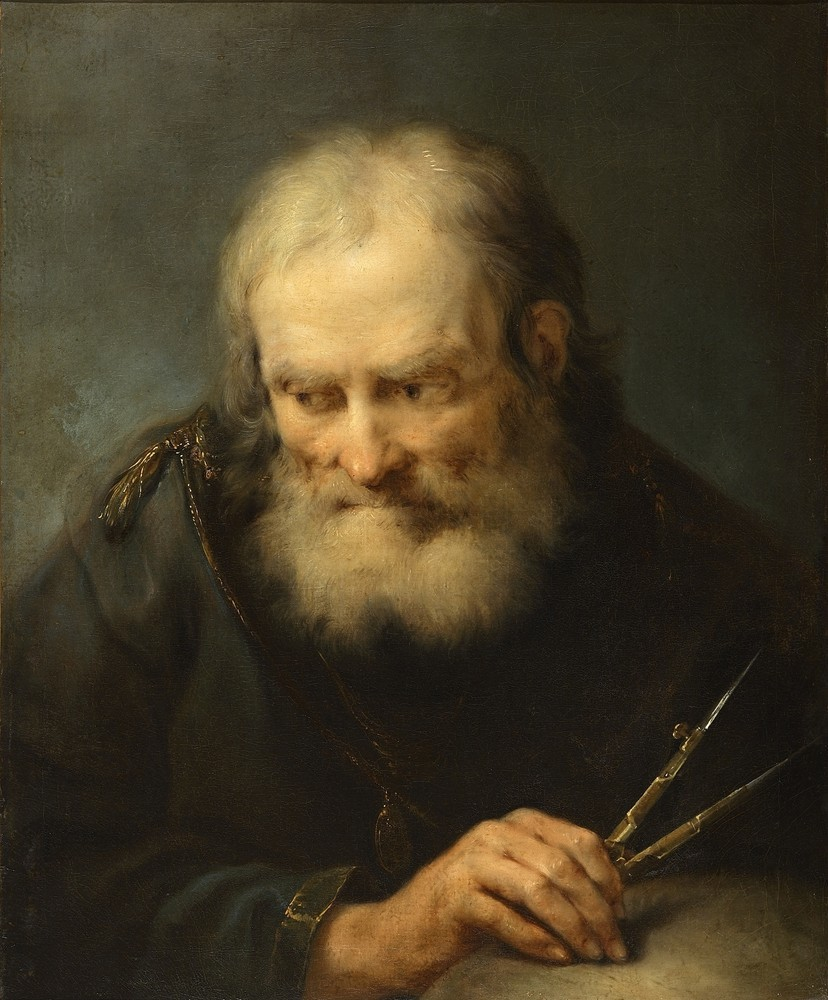
Archimedes of Syracuse, mathematician, physicist, engineer, astronomer, and inventor. Portrait by Giuseppe Nogari (18th century), Pushkin Museum, Moscow.

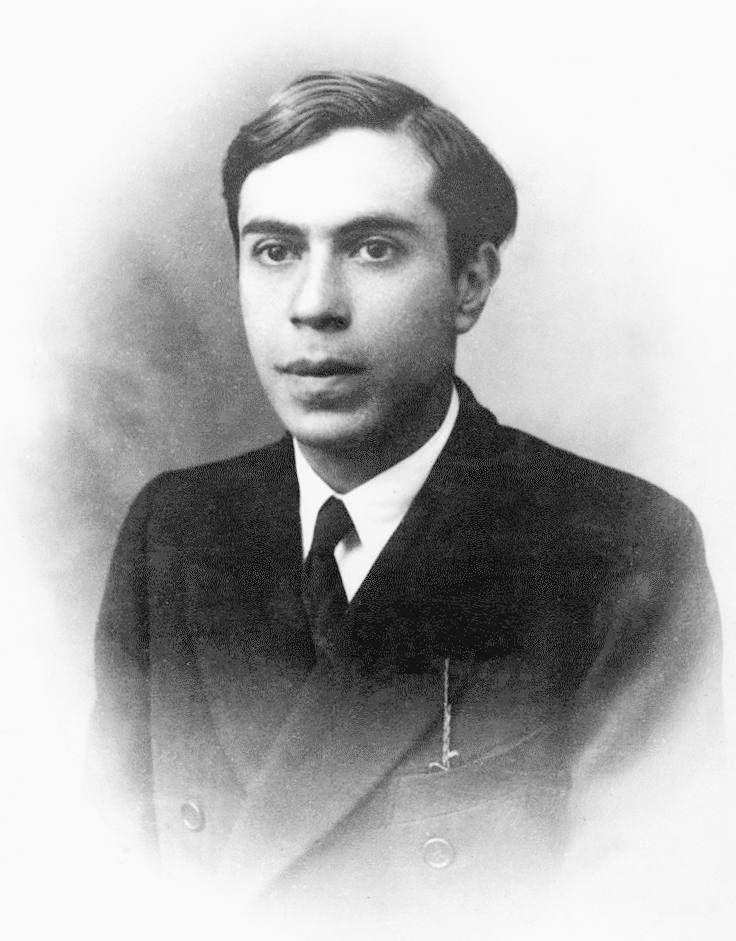
Ettore Majorana, theoretical physicist who worked on neutrino masses; the Majorana equation and Majorana fermions are named after him.

- Empedocles (c. 490–430 BC), scientist and philosopher
- Acron (5th century BC), physician
- Gorgias (c. 483–375 BC), philosopher
- Hicetas (c. 400–c. 335 BC), philosopher
- Monimus (c. 399–300 BC), philosopher
- Menecrates of Syracuse (4th century BC), physician
- Euhemerus (c. 330–250 a.C.), philosopher
- Dicaearchus (c. 350–c. 285 BC), philosopher, cartographer, geographer, mathematician
- Archimedes (c. 287 – 212 BC), engineer and mathematician
- Ibn Zafar (1104–1170), philosopher and polymath
- Giovanni Aurispa (1376–1459), anthropologist
- Francesco Maurolico (1494–1575), mathematician
- Giovanni Filippo Ingrassia (1510–1580), physician, anatomist
- Giovanni Battista Hodierna (1597–1660), astronomer
- Paolo Boccone (1633–1704), botanist
- Tommaso Campailla (1668–1740), philosopher, doctor, poet
- Francesco Paolo Cantelli (1875–1966), mathematician
- Orso Mario Corbino (1876–1937), physicist
- Leonardo Ximenes (1716–1786), mathematician, engineer, astronomer, geographer
- Bernardino da Ucria (1739–1796), botanist
- Giuseppe Piazzi (1746–1826), astronomer, discovered the minor planet Ceres
- Niccolò Cacciatore (1780–1841), astronomer
- Vincenzo Tineo (1791–1856), botanist
- Gioacchino Ventura di Raulica (1792–1861), philosopher
- Filippo Parlatore (1816–1877), botanist
- Stanislao Cannizzaro (1826–1910), chemist
- Giuseppe Seguenza (1833–1889), naturalist, geologist
- Giuseppe Sergi (1841–1936), anthropologist
- Gaetano Mosca (1858–1941), political scientist
- Silvio Micali (born 1954), computer scientists and Turing award recipient
- Gaspare Mignosi (1875–1951), mathematician
- Gaetano Fichera (1922–1996), mathematician
- Giuseppe Lauricella (1867–1913), mathematician
- Giovanni Gentile (1875–1944), philosopher
- José Ingenieros (1877–1925), physician, pharmacist, philosopher
- Michele Cipolla (1880–1947), mathematician
- Mauro Picone (1885–1977), mathematician
- Giuseppe Oddo (1865–1954), chemist
- Emanuele Paternò (1847–1935), chemist
- Giuseppe Mario Bellanca (1886–1960), aviation inventor
- Giovanni Sansone (1888–1979), mathematician
- David J. Impastato (1903–1986), neuropsychiatrist
- Giuseppe Gabrielli (1903–1987), aeronautics engineer
- Michele Parrinello (born 1945), physicist
- Antonino Lo Surdo (1880–1949), physicist
- Ettore Majorana (1906–1997), physicist
- Quirino Majorana (1871–1957), physicist
- Manlio Sgalambro (1924–2014), philosopher, poet
- Antonino Zichichi (born 1929), physicist
- Luca Parmitano (born 1976), engineer and astronaut
- Vito Latora (born 1971), physicist
- Flavia Sparacino (born 1966)
- Napoleone Ferrara (born 1956)

== Poets, writers and journalists ==
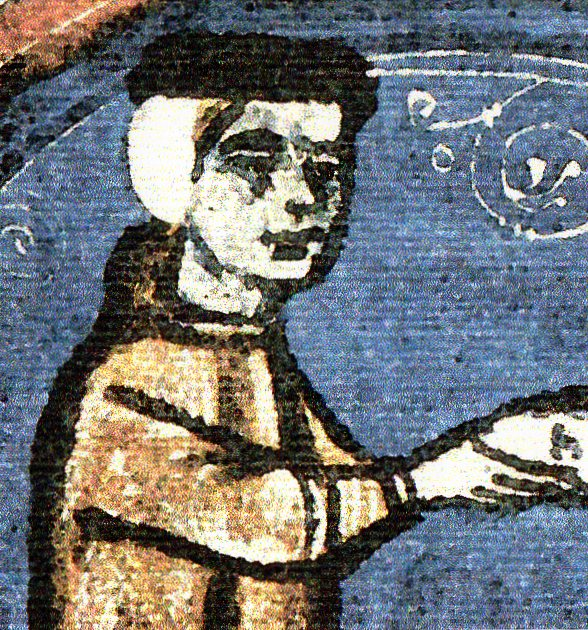
Jacopo da Lentini, senior poet of the Sicilian School, credited with the invention of the sonnet.

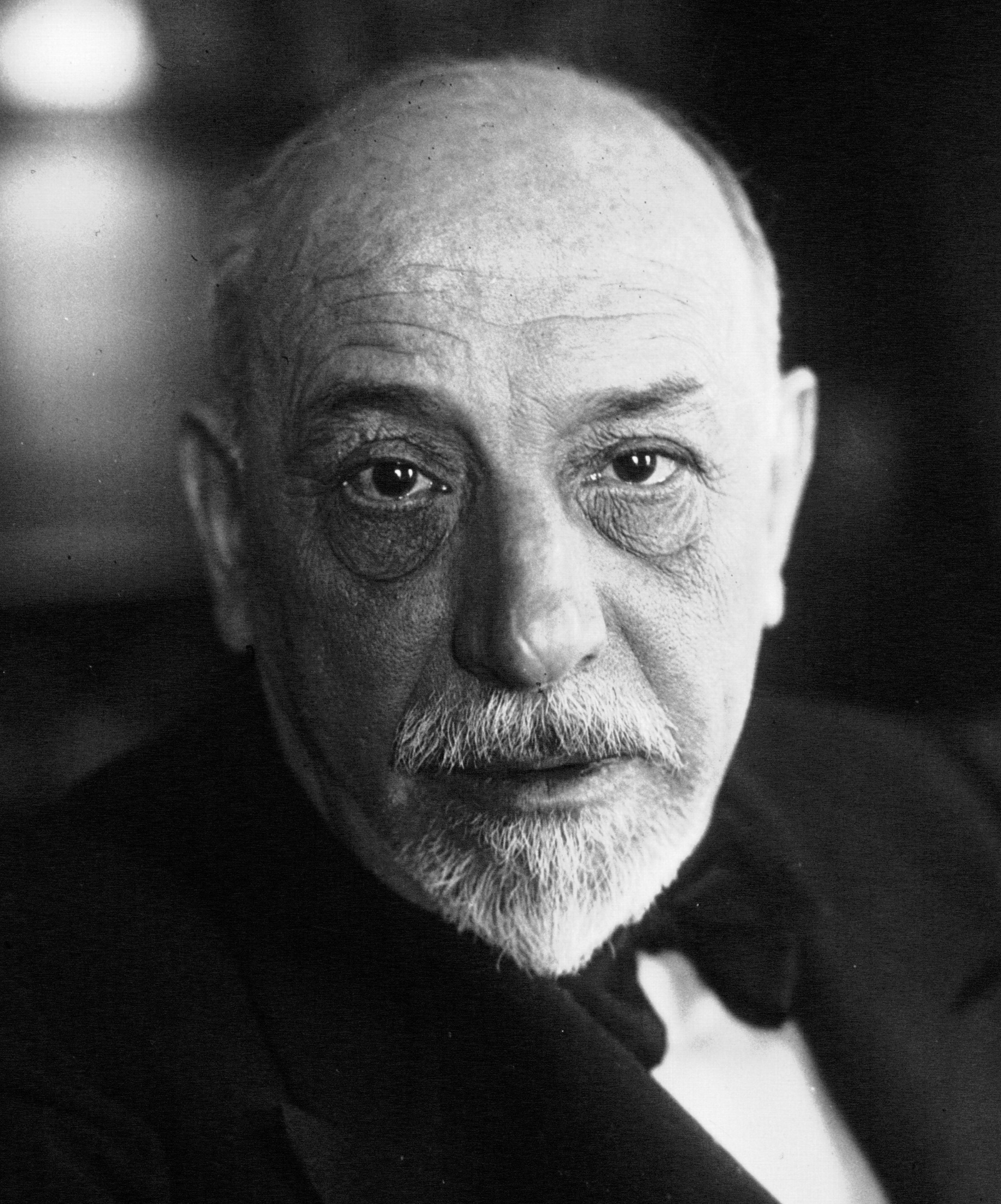
Luigi Pirandello, dramatist, novelist and poet; he was awarded the 1934 Nobel Prize in Literature for "his almost magical power to turn psychological analysis into good theatre."

- Epicharmus of Kos (c. 524–c. 435 BC), comic poet, dramatist, philosopher
- Antiochus of Syracuse (5th century BC), historian
- Corax of Syracuse (5th century BC), rhetorician
- Sophron (5th century BC), writer of mimes
- Lysias (c. 445–c. 380 BC), logographer, jurist
- Philistus (c. 432–356 BC), historian
- Carcinus (c. 420–360 BC), dramatist
- Archestratus (4th century BC), poet
- Timaeus (c. 345–250 BC), historian
- Rhinthon (c. 323–285 BC), dramatist
- Theocritus (c. 310–250 BC), poet
- Diodorus Siculus (c. 90–30 BC), historian
- Julius Firmicus Maternus (4th century AD), writer, astrologer
- Ibn al-Qatta (1041–1121), philologist and lexicographer
- Ibn Hamdis (1056–1133), poet
- Al-Mazari (1061–1141), eminent jurist from Mazara del Vallo
- Eugenius of Palermo (c. 1130–1202), translator
- Cielo d'Alcamo (13th century), poet
- Nina Siciliana (13th century), poet
- Stefano Protonotaro da Messina (13th century), poet
- Giacomo da Lentini (1210–1260), poet
- Guido Delle Colonne (1215–1290), poet
- Antonio Beccadelli (1394–1471), poet, historian
- Pietro Ranzano (1428–1492), historian
- Lucio Marineo (1444–1533), humanist, historian
- Giovanni Luca Barberi (1452–1520), historian
- Cataldo Parisio (1455–1517), humanist
- Tommaso Fazello (1498–1570), historian
- Nicoletta Pasquale (16th century), poet
- Antonio Veneziano (1543–1593), poet
- Sebastiano Bagolino (1562–1604), poet, scholar
- Pietro Fullone (1600–1670), poet
- Filadelfo Mugnos (1607–1675), historian, genealogist, poet
- Giuseppe Artale (1632–1679), poet
- Giovanni Meli (1740–1815), poet
- Domenico Tempio (1750–1821), poet
- Michele Amari (1806–1889), historian, orientalist, politician
- Gabriele Dara (1826–1885), Arbëreshë poet, politician
- Luigi Capuana (1839–1915), writer
- Giovanni Verga (1840–1922), novelist
- Giuseppe Pitrè (1841–1916), historian
- Mario Rapisardi (1844–1912), poet
- Napoleone Colajanni (1847–1921), writer, journalist, politician
- Pietro Gori (1865–1911), journalist, poet
- Luigi Pirandello (1867–1936), dramatist, Nobel laureate
- Nino Martoglio (1870–1921), writer, dramatist
- Maria Messina (1887–1944), writer of short fiction, novelist
- Giuseppe Tomasi di Lampedusa (1896–1957), writer, poet
- Ignazio Buttitta (1899–1997), poet
- Salvatore Quasimodo (1901–1968), poet, Nobel laureate
- Ercole Patti (1903–1976), writer
- Vitaliano Brancati (1907–1954), writer
- Elio Vittorini (1908–1966), writer
- Helle Busacca (1915–1996), poet
- Gesualdo Bufalino (1920–1996), writer
- Leonardo Sciascia (1921–1989), writer, politician
- Angelo Maria Ripellino (1923–1978), translator, poet
- Vince Colletta (1923–1991), comic book artist, art director
- Andrea Camilleri (1925–2019), novelist
- Giuseppe Fava (1925–1984), writer and dramatist
- Mario Francese (1925–1979), journalist
- Maria Costa (1926–2016), poet
- Candido Cannavò (1930–2009) sports journalist
- Santi Visalli (born 1932), photojournalist
- Vincenzo Consolo (1933–2012), novelist
- Dacia Maraini (born 1936), novelist
- Gaetano Cipolla (born 1937), Sicilian-to-English translator, author, publisher of the journal Arba Sicula
- Emma Baeri (born 1942), feminist historian, political scientist
- Peppino Impastato (1948–1978), journalist, political activist
- Marcello Sorgi (born 1955), writer, journalist
- Lara Cardella (born 1969), novelist
- Alessandro D'Avenia (born 1977), writer
- Melissa Panarello (born 1985), novelist

== Painters, sculptors and architects ==
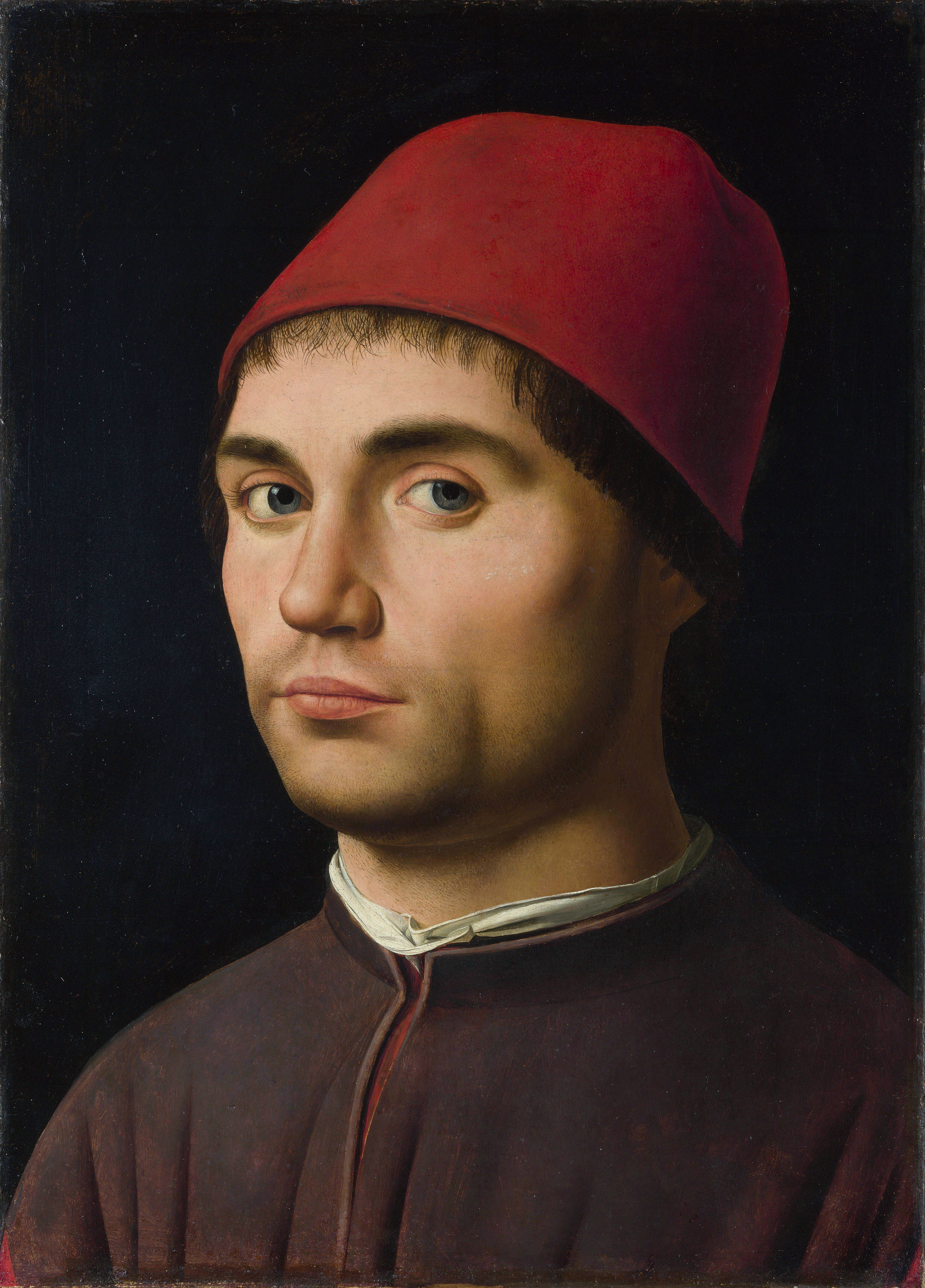
Antonello da Messina, painter, active during the Italian Renaissance; Giorgio Vasari credited him with the introduction of oil painting into Italy.

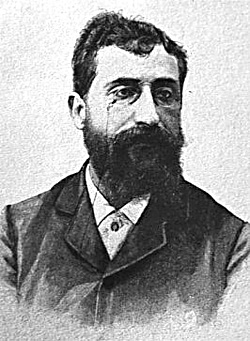
Ernesto Basile, architect, exponent of modernisme and Liberty style, known especially for the projects of the Teatro Massimo of Palermo and the Palazzo Montecitorio in Rome.

- Antonello da Messina (1430–1479), painter
- Riccardo Quartararo (1443–1506), painter
- Girolamo Alibrandi (1470–1524), painter
- Antonello Gagini (1478–1536), sculptor
- Giacomo del Duca (1520–1604), sculptor, architect
- Tommaso Laureti (1530–1602), painter
- Natale Masuccio (1561–1619), Jesuit architect
- Mariano Smiriglio (1561–1636), architect, painter
- Mario Minniti (1577–1640), painter
- Alonzo Rodriguez (1578–1648), painter
- Antonio Barbalonga (1600–1649), painter
- Pietro Novelli (1603–1647), painter
- Giovanni Quagliata (1603–1673), painter
- Onofrio Gabrielli (1619–1706), painter
- Agostino Scilla (1629–1700), painter
- Angelo Italia (1628–1700), Jesuit architect
- Filippo Tancredi (1655–1722), painter
- Gaetano Giulio Zumbo (1656–1701), sculptor
- Filippo Juvarra (1678–1736), architect
- Rosario Gagliardi (1698–1762), architect
- Giovanni Battista Vaccarini (1702–1768), architect
- Pietro Novelli (1603–1647), painter
- Giacomo Serpotta (1656–1732), sculptor
- Olivio Sòzzi (1696–1765), painter
- Giovanni Antonio Medrano (1703–1760), architect
- Giuseppe Vasi (1710–1782), engraver, architect
- Vincenzo Sinatra (1720–1765), architect
- Francesco Sabatini (1721–1797), architect
- Giuseppe Venanzio Marvuglia (1729–1814), architect
- Mariano Rossi (1731–1807), painter
- Giuseppe Velazquez (1750–1827), painter
- Giuseppe Cammarano (1766–1850), painter
- Michele Rapisardi (1822–1886), painter
- Giovan Battista Filippo Basile (1825–1891), architect
- Francesco Lojacono (1838–1915), painter
- Vitaliano Poselli (1838–1918), architect
- Vincenzo Ragusa (1841–1927), sculptor
- Ettore Ximenes (1855–1926), sculptor
- Ernesto Basile (1857–1932), architect
- Mario Rutelli (1859–1941), sculptor
- Giorgio de Chirico (1888–1978), painter
- Francisco Salamone (1897–1959), architect
- Giuseppe Migneco (1908–1997), painter
- Renato Guttuso (1912–1987), painter
- Emilio Greco (1913–1995), sculptor,
- Topazia Alliata (1913–2015), painter, art curator
- Salvatore Fiume (1915–1997), painter, sculptor, architect
- Pietro Consagra (1920–2005), sculptor
- Bruno Caruso (1927–2018), painter, illustrator, graphic designer
- Gaetano Tranchino (born 1938), painter
- Arturo Di Modica (born 1941), sculptor
- Manfredi Beninati (born 1970), visual artist
- Antonino Cardillo (born 1975), architect

== Musicians ==
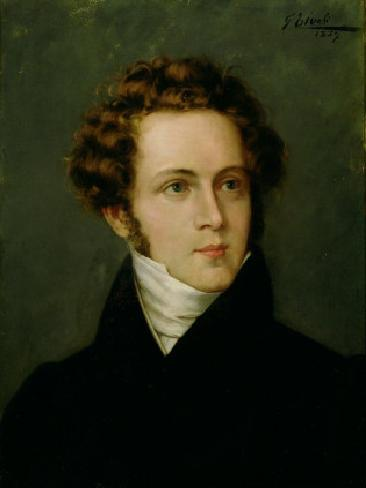
Vincenzo Bellini, opera composer who was known for his long-flowing melodic lines for which he was named "the Swan of Catania"; some of his works such as La sonnambula, made him one of the most famous composers of his time in Italy and Europe.

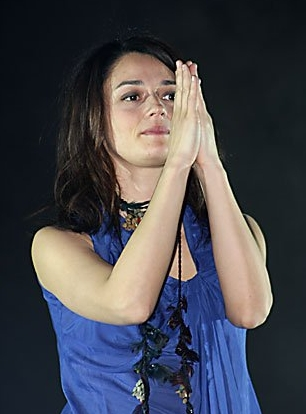
Carmen Consoli, singer-songwriter. Described as "a remarkable combination of rocker and intellectual".

- Sigismondo d'India (1582–1629), composer
- Alessandro Scarlatti (1660–1725), composer
- Emanuele d'Astorga (1680–1757), composer
- Pietro Antonio Coppola (1793–1876), composer, conductor
- Giovanni Pacini (1796–1867), composer
- Mario Aspa (1797–1868), composer
- Vincenzo Bellini (1801–1835), opera composer
- Errico Petrella (1813–1877), opera composer
- Antonino Gandolfo Brancaleone (1820–1888), composer
- Achille Campisiano (1837–1908), pianist, composer
- Roberto Stagno (1840–1897), tenor
- Mario Sammarco (1868–1930), baritone
- Giuseppe Anselmi (1876–1929), tenor
- Vincent Rose (1880–1944), violinist, pianist, composer
- Gino Marinuzzi (1882–1945), composer, conductor
- Ignacio Corsini (1891–1967), folklore and tango musician
- Santa Biondo (1892–1989), soprano
- Salvatore Allegra (1898–1993), composer
- Franco Ferrara (1911–1985), conductor
- Corrado Galzio (1919–2020), musician and piano player
- Giuseppe Di Stefano (1921–2008), operatic tenor
- Rosa Balistreri (1927–1990), singer
- Roberto Pregadio (1928–2010), composer, conductor, TV personality
- Pippo Caruso (1935–2018), composer, conductor
- Tony Cucchiara (1937–2018), singer, composer
- Umberto Balsamo (born 1942), singer-songwriter
- Christian (1943-2025), singer
- Salvatore Adamo (born 1943), singer
- Nico dei Gabbiani (1944–2012), singer
- Aldo Stellita (1944–1998), composer, musician, member of Matia Bazar
- Franco Battiato (1945–2021), musician, filmmaker
- Gianni Bella (born 1945), singer-songwriter, composer
- Cristiano Malgioglio (born 1945), singer-songwriter, composer
- Salvatore Sciarrino (born 1947), composer
- Frédéric François (born 1950), singer
- Giuni Russo (1951–2004), singer-songwriter
- Marcella Bella (born 1952), singer
- Vincenzo Spampinato (born 1953), singer-songwriter
- Luca Madonia (born 1957), singer-songwriter
- Fabio Biondi (born 1961), violinist
- Giovanni Sollima (born 1962), composer, cellist
- Lucia Aliberti (born 1963), operatic soprano
- Rosario Di Bella (born 1963), singer-songwriter
- Mario Venuti (born 1963), singer-songwriter, producer
- Marcello Giordani (1963–2019), tenor
- Gerardina Trovato (born 1967), singer
- Salvatore Di Vittorio (born 1967), composer
- Francesca Alotta (born 1968), singer
- Roy Paci (born 1969), trumpeter, singer-songwriter
- Jeffrey Jey (born 1970), singer-songwriter, member of Eiffel 65
- Paolo Buonvino (born 1970), composer, conductor, music arranger
- Mario Biondi (born 1971), singer
- Jenny B (born 1972), singer
- Santi Pulvirenti (born 1973), composer
- Filippa Giordano (born 1974), singer
- Carmen Consoli (born 1974), singer-songwriter
- Misstress Barbara (born 1975), DJ, singer-songwriter
- Antonino Fogliani (1976–2026), conductor
- Desirée Rancatore (born 1977), soprano
- Vincenzo Luvineri (born 1977) rapper AKA Vinnie Paz
- Silvia Salemi (born 1978), singer-songwriter
- Marracash (born 1979), rapper
- Giusy Ferreri (born 1979), singer
- Romina Arena (born 1980), singer
- Oriana Civile (born 1980), singer and ethnomusicologist
- Dimartino (born 1982), singer-songwriter
- Colapesce (born 1983), singer-songwriter
- Dario Mangiaracina (born 1985), musician, member of La Rappresentante di Lista
- Levante (born 1987), singer-songwriter
- Cristina Scuccia (born 1988), singer
- Francesco Cafiso (born 1989), jazz saxophonist
- Giovanni Caccamo (born 1990), singer-songwriter
- Deborah Iurato (born 1991), singer
- Piero Barone (born 1993), singer, member of Il Volo
- Lorenzo Fragola (born 1995), singer
- La Bionda, composers, record producers

== Actors, directors and producers ==
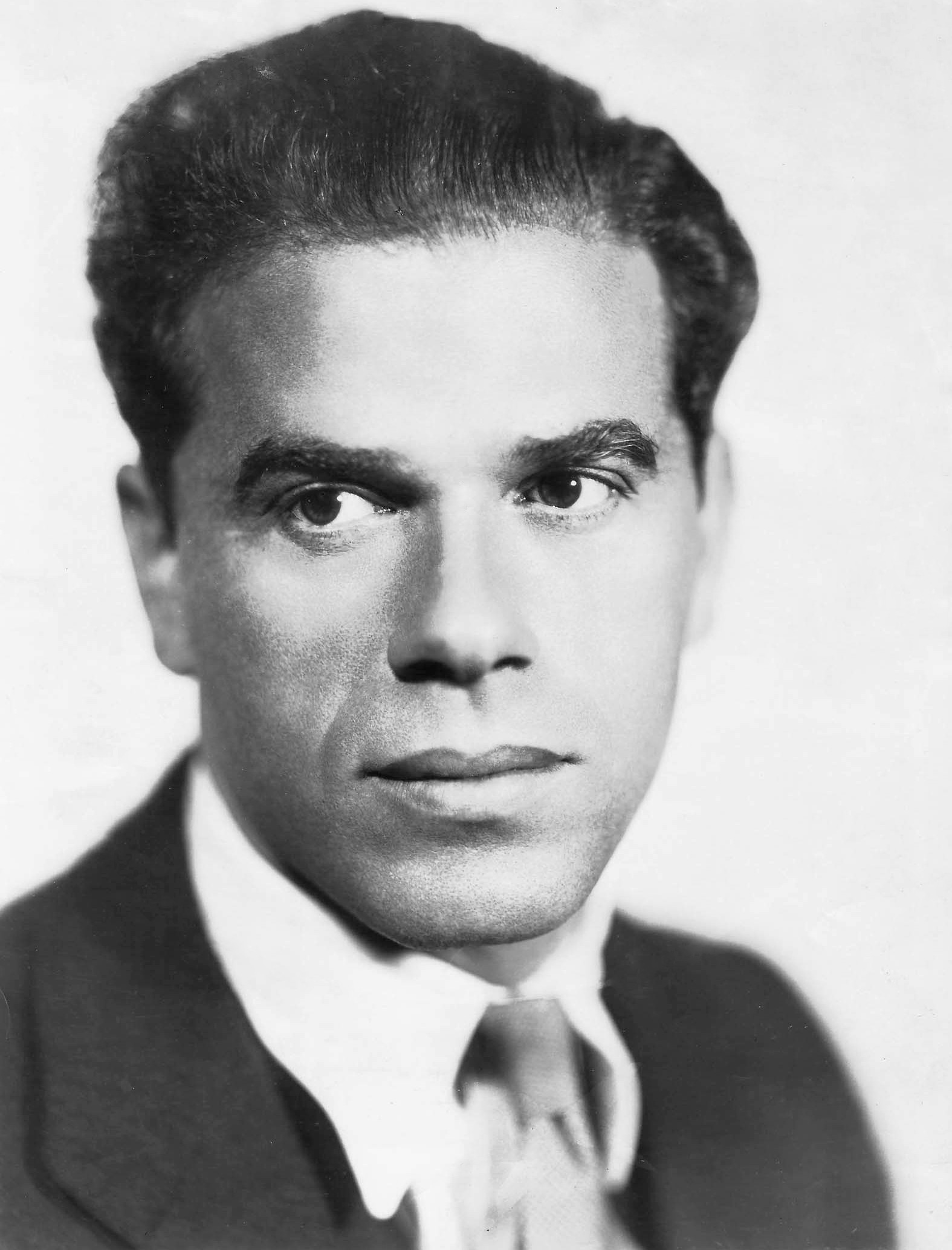
Frank Capra, Sicilian-born American film director, producer and writer who became the creative force behind some of the major award-winning films of the 1930s and 1940s.

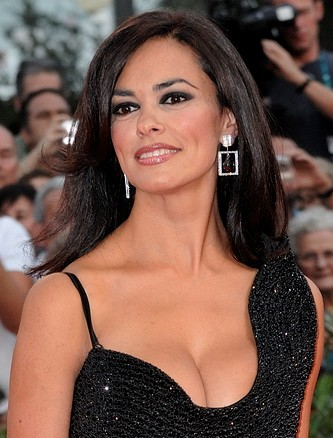
Maria Grazia Cucinotta, actress who has featured in many films and television series since 1990, and internationally known for her role in the Italian film Il Postino.

- Pipina Bonasera (1838–1927), stage actress
- Angelo Musco (1872–1937), actor
- Ernesto Almirante (1877–1964), actor
- Febo Mari (1884–1939), actor, director
- Mimi Aguglia (1884–1970), actress
- Henry Armetta (1888–1945), actor
- Pina Menichelli (1890–1984), actress
- Sol Polito (1892–1960), cinematographer
- Frank Puglia (1892–1975), actor
- Piero Carnabuci (1893–1958), actor
- Frank Capra (1897–1991), actor, director
- Rosina Anselmi (1880–1965), actress
- Turi Pandolfini (1883–1962), actor
- Michele Abruzzo (1904–1996), actor
- Rocco D'Assunta (1904–1970), actor
- Salvo Randone (1906–1991), actor
- Pino Mercanti (1911–1986), director, screenwriter
- Gino Buzzanca (1912–1985), actor
- Ignazio Balsamo (1912–1994), actor
- Saro Urzì (1913–1979), actor
- Clara Auteri (1918–2018), actress
- Mario Landi (1920–1992), director
- Turi Ferro (1921–2001), actor
- Adolfo Celi (1922–1986), actor
- Tano Cimarosa (1922–2008), actor
- Ciccio Ingrassia (1922–2003), actor, director
- Turi Vasile (1922–2009), producer, director
- Vittorio De Seta (1923–2011), director
- Nino Terzo (1923–2005), actor
- Carlo Sposito (1924–1984), actor
- Roberto Mauri (1924–2018), actor, director
- Goliarda Sapienza (1924–1996), actress, writer
- Carla Calò (1926–2019), actress
- Franco Franchi (1928–1992), actor
- Massimo Mollica (1929–2013), actor, theatre director
- Luigi Vannucchi (1930–1978), actor
- Franco Indovina (1932–1972), director, screenwriter
- Michele Lupo (1932–1989), director
- Pino Caruso (1934–2019), actor, author, TV personality
- Tuccio Musumeci (born 1934), actor
- Aldo Puglisi (1935–2024), actor
- Robert Hundar (1935–2008), actor
- Daniela Rocca (1937–1995), actress, model
- Biagio Pelligra (born 1937), actor
- Lando Buzzanca (1935–2022), actor
- Michele Gammino (born 1941), actor
- Elio Zamuto (born 1941), actor
- Aurora Quattrocchi (born 1943), actress
- Leo Gullotta (born 1946), actor
- Beppe Cino (born 1947), director
- Carla Cassola (born 1947), actress
- Franco Diogene (1947–2005), actor
- Luigi Maria Burruano (1948–2017), actor
- Nino Frassica (born 1950), actor
- Jerry Calà (born 1951), actor, comedian
- Andrea Tidona (born 1951), actor
- Antonio Catania (born 1952), actor
- Lucia Sardo (born 1952), actress
- Frank Sivero (born 1952), actor
- Riccardo Schicchi (1953–2012), director, producer
- Tony Sperandeo (born 1953), actor
- Giuseppe Tornatore (born 1956), director
- Aurelio Grimaldi (born 1957), director
- Donatella Maiorca (born 1957), director
- Aldo Baglio (born 1958), actor, comedian
- Franco Maresco (born 1958), director
- Roberto Andò (born 1959), director
- Jo Prestia (born 1960), actor
- Anna Kanakis (born 1962), model, actress
- Daniele Ciprì (born 1962), director
- Ninni Bruschetta (born 1962), actor, director
- Enrico Lo Verso (born 1964), actor
- Vincenzo Amato (born 1966), actor
- Luigi Lo Cascio (born 1967), actor
- Francesco Benigno (born 1967), actor
- Emma Dante (born 1967), director, playwright, actress
- Giuseppe Fiorello (born 1969), actor
- Maria Grazia Cucinotta (born 1969), actress
- Dario Bandiera (born 1970), actor, comedian
- Donatella Finocchiaro (born 1970), actress
- Teresa Mannino (born 1970), actress, comedian, TV personality
- Ficarra e Picone (born 1971), actors, comedians
- Lorenzo Crespi (born 1971), actor
- Luca Guadagnino (born 1971), director
- Pif (born 1972), actor, director
- Gaetano Bruno (born 1973), actor
- Guido Caprino (born 1973), actor
- Costanza Quatriglio (born 1973), director
- Paolo Briguglia (born 1974), actor
- Loredana Cannata (born 1975), actress
- Claudio Gioè (born 1975), actor
- Barbara Tabita (born 1975), actress
- Tiziana Lodato (born 1976), actress
- Corrado Fortuna (born 1978), actor, director
- Laura Torrisi (born 1979), actress
- Nicole Grimaudo (born 1980), actress
- Isabella Ragonese (born 1981), actress
- Stefania Spampinato (born 1982), actress, director, dancer
- Francesco Scianna (born 1982), actor
- Margareth Madè (born 1982), actress
- Valeria Bilello (born 1982), actress, model
- Angelo Duro (born 1982), actor, comedian
- Francesca Chillemi (born 1985), actress, model
- Miriam Leone (born 1985), actress, model, TV personality
- Tea Falco (born 1986), actress
- Dario Aita (born 1987), actor
- Giusy Buscemi (born 1993), actress, model
- Selene Caramazza (born 1993), actress

== Politicians, civil servants and military personnel ==
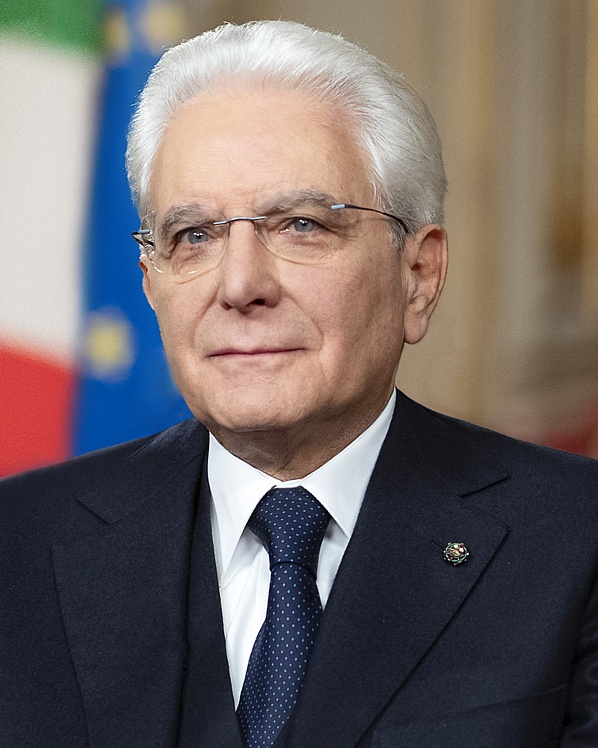
Sergio Mattarella politician, judge and current President of Italy.

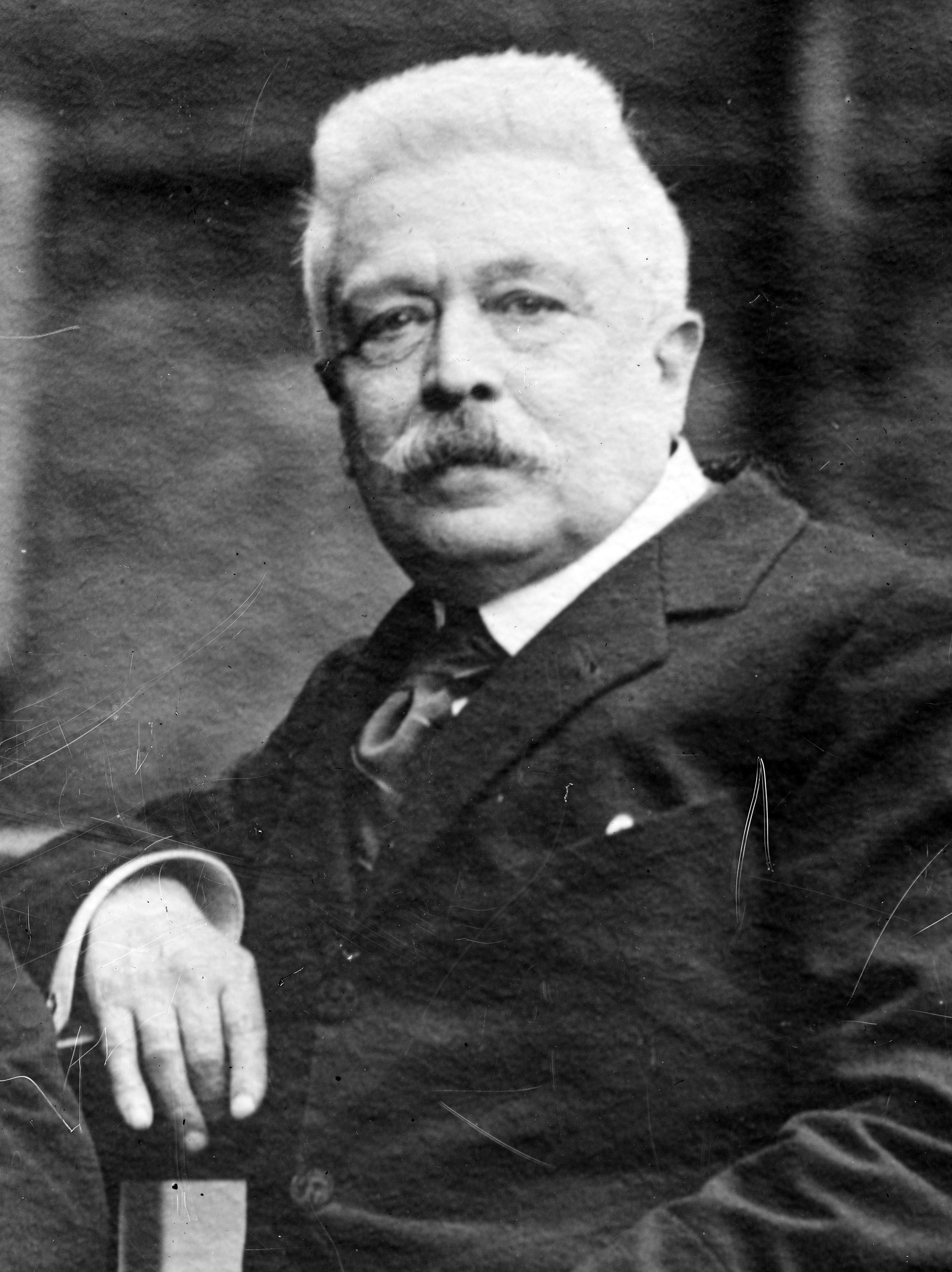
Vittorio Emanuele Orlando, 23rd Prime Minister of Italy who led Italy to victory during World War I and whose political leadership and military reforms and appointments enabled Italy to defeat Austria-Hungary. He was known as "Premier of Victory."

- Abu al-Qasim ibn Hammud (c. 1130), qā’id or senior official
- Leopoldo de Gregorio, Marquess of Squillace (1699–1785), statesman
- Federico Carlo Gravina (1756–1806), admiral of Spain
- Francesco Paolo Di Blasi (1753/1755–1795), jurist, revolutionary
- Carlo Cottone (1756–1829), politician
- Ruggero Settimo (1776–1863), politician
- Giuseppe La Farina (1815–1863), politician
- Giuseppe Natoli (1815–1867), politician
- Francesco Crispi (1818–1901), politician, 11th Prime Minister of Italy
- Emanuele Notarbartolo (1834–1893), politician
- Antonio Starabba, Marquess of Rudinì (1839–1908), politician, 12th Prime Minister of Italy
- Antonino Paternò Castello, Marquess of San Giuliano (1852–1914), diplomat and Minister of Foreign Affairs
- Vittorio Emanuele Orlando (1860–1952), politician, 23rd Prime Minister of Italy
- Pietro Lanza di Scalea (1863–1938), politician
- Luigi Sturzo (1871–1959), politician
- Guido Jung (1876–1949), banker, politician
- Andrea Finocchiaro Aprile (1878–1964), politician
- Gaspare Ambrosini (1886–1986), judge, politician
- Luigi Rizzo (1887–1951), admiral
- Gaetano Martino (1900–1967), politician
- Vincent R. Impellitteri (1900–1987), politician, mayor of New York City
- Mario Scelba (1901–1991), politician
- Filippo Anfuso (1901–1963), diplomat, politician
- Ugo La Malfa (1903–1979), politician
- Giorgio La Pira (1904–1977), politician
- Giuseppe Alessi (1905–2009), politician
- Antonio Canepa (1908–1945), politician, revolutionary
- Franco Restivo (1911–1976), politician
- Placido Rizzotto (1914–1948), trade union leader
- Antonino Caponnetto (1920–2002), judge
- Cesare Terranova (1921–1979), judge, politician
- Rocco Chinnici (1925–1983), judge
- Pio La Torre (1927–1982), politician
- Boris Giuliano (1930–1979), policeman
- Piersanti Mattarella (1935–1980), politician
- Giovanni Falcone (1939–1992), judge
- Paolo Borsellino (1940–1992), judge
- Sergio Mattarella (born 1941), judge, politician, current president of Italy
- Antonio Martino (born 1942), politician
- Pietro Grasso (born 1945), judge, politician
- Ninni Cassarà (1947–1985), policeman
- Ignazio La Russa (born 1947), politician
- Leoluca Orlando (born 1947), politician
- Renato Schifani (born 1950), politician
- Rosario Livatino (1952–1990), judge
- Anna Finocchiaro (born 1955), politician
- Giulia Bongiorno (born 1966), politician, lawyer
- Angelino Alfano (born 1970), politician
- Alfonso Bonafede (born 1976), politician

== Sports figures ==
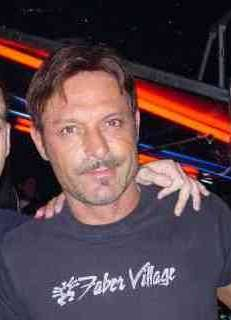
Salvatore Schillaci, 1990 World Cup Golden Boot as the leading goalscorer. He received the Golden Ball as player of the tournament. He also placed second in the 1990 Ballon d'Or.

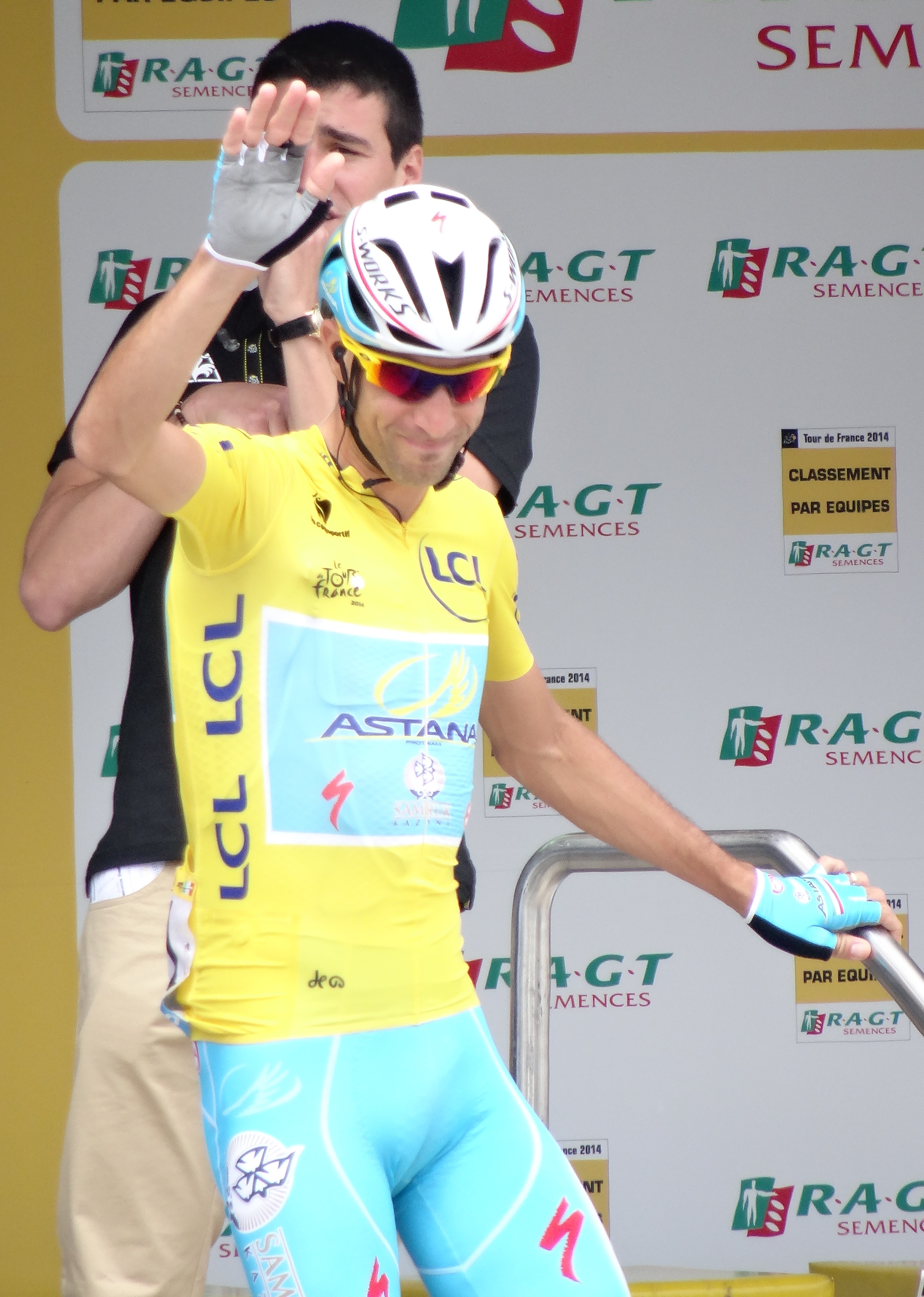
Vincenzo Nibali, road bicycle racer. He is one of seven cyclists who have won all three of cycling's Grand Tours in their career – having won the 2010 Vuelta a España, the 2013 and 2016 Giro d'Italia, and the 2014 Tour de France.

- Paolo Boi (1528–1598), chess player
- Pietro Speciale (1876–1945), fencer, gold medal in the team foil at the 1920 Antwerp Olympics
- Giovanni Canova (1880–1960), fencer (gold medal at the 1920 Summer Olympics)
- Francesco Calì (1882–1949), footballer
- Johnny Dundee (1893–1965), boxer
- Francesco Gargano (1899–1975), fencer and the first Sicilian to win a gold medal at the 1920 Antwerp Olympics
- Giovanni Corrieri (1920–2017), road bicycle racer
- Concetto Lo Bello (1924–1991), football referee
- Enzo Maiorca (1931–2016), free diver
- Guido Messina (1931–2020), road bicycle racer (gold medal with the Italian team at the 1952 Summer Olympics)
- Nino Vaccarella (born 1933), racecar driver
- Franco Scoglio (1941–2005), football manager
- Giuseppe Furino (born 1946), footballer
- Tullio Lanese (born 1947), football referee
- Pietro Anastasi (1948–2020), footballer
- Giovanni Scalzo (born 1959), fencer (gold medal in the team sabre event at the 1984 Summer Olympics)
- Salvatore Antibo (born 1962), runner
- Pasquale Marino (born 1962), footballer, football manager
- Michelangelo Rampulla (born 1962), footballer, football manager
- Alessandro Campagna (water polo) (born 1963), water polo player and coach
- Salvatore Schillaci (1964–2024), footballer
- Maurizio Randazzo (born 1964), fencer (gold medal in the team épée events at the 1996 and 2000 Summer Olympics)
- Alessandro Melli (born 1969), footballer
- Annarita Sidoti (1969–2015), race walker
- Massimo Taibi (born 1970), footballer
- Andrea Lo Cicero (born 1976), rugby union player
- Valerio Vermiglio (born 1976), volleyball player
- Francesco Coco (born 1977), footballer
- Paolo Tiralongo (born 1977), road bicycle racer
- Giuseppe Gibilisco (born 1979), pole vaulter
- Silvia Bosurgi (born 1979), water polo player (gold medal with the Women's National Team at the 2004 Summer Olympics)
- Giuseppe Mascara (born 1979), footballer
- Giovanni Visconti (born 1983), road bicycle racer
- Vincenzo Nibali (born 1984), road bicycle racer
- Tony Cairoli (born 1985), eight-time Grand Prix motocross world champion
- Luca Marin (born 1986), medley swimmer
- Damiano Caruso (born 1987), road bicycle racer
- Giorgio Avola (born 1989), fencer (gold medal at the 2012 Summer Olympics in the men's team foil event)
- Mario Balotelli (born 1990), footballer
- Daniele Garozzo (born 1992), foil fencer (gold medal in the Men's Individual Foil at the 2016 Summer Olympics)
- Marco Cecchinato (born 1992), tennis player
- Miriam Sylla (born 1995), volleyball player

== Others ==
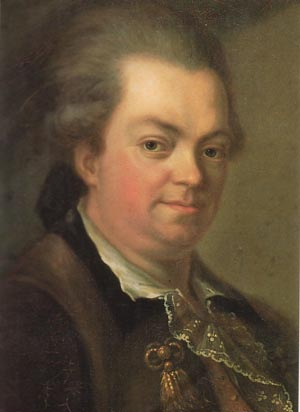
Alessandro Cagliostro, adventurer and self-styled magician. He became a glamorous figure associated with the royal courts of Europe where he pursued various occult arts, including psychic healing, alchemy, and scrying.

- Phrygillus (5th century BC), medallist and engraver of precious stones
- Eunus (died 132 BC), leader of the slave uprising in the First Servile War
- Dina and Clarenza (13th century), heroines during the Sicilian Vespers
- Manfredi Chiaramonte (died 1391), nobleman
- Aaron Abualrabi (1400–1450), Jewish scholar, cabalist, and astrologer
- Laura Lanza, Baroness of Carini (1529–1563), noblewoman
- Juan Dominguez Palermo (c.1560–1635), conquistador
- Procopio Cutò (1651–1727), chef
- Giovanna Bonanno (1713–1789), alleged witch and poisoner
- Count Alessandro di Cagliostro (1743–1795), traveller, occultist
- Lucia Migliaccio (1770–1826), second wife of the king Ferdinand I of the Two Sicilies
- Pietro Bachi (1787–1853), professor
- Giuseppa Bolognara Calcagno (1826–1884), freedom fighter
- Joseph Whitaker (1850–1936), ornithologist, archaeologist and sportsman
- Maria Paternò Arezzo (1869–1908), noblewoman, philanthropist
- Ignazio Florio Jr. (1869–1957), entrepreneur
- Franca Florio (1873–1950), noblewoman, socialite
- Vincenzo Florio (1883–1959), entrepreneur and founder of the Targa Florio race
- Frank Lentini (1884/1889–1966), showman
- Josephine Terranova (1889–1981), accused murderer
- Fulco di Verdura (1898–1978), jeweller
- Nunzio Filogamo (1902–2002), television and radio presenter
- Bernard Castro (1904–1991), inventor
- Nicolò Carosio (1907–1984), sport journalist
- Raimondo Lanza di Trabia (1915–1954), soldier, diplomat, sportsman
- Rosalia Lombardo (1918–1920), known as the Sleeping Beauty
- Renzo Barbera (1920–2002), businessman and sportsman
- Salvatore Giuliano (1922–1950), bandit
- Danilo Dolci (1924–1997), social activist, sociologist
- Enzo Sellerio (1924–2012), photographer, publisher, and collector
- Libero Grassi (1924–1991), manufacturer and antimafia activist
- Paolo Giaccone (1929–1982) professor, forensic pathologist and Mafia's victim
- Nuccio Costa (1925–1991), television presenter
- Pino Zac (1930–1985), illustrator
- Letizia Battaglia (1935–2022), photographer and photojournalist
- Pippo Baudo (1936–2025), television presenter
- Giuseppe Coco (1936–2012), illustrator
- Lino Saputo (born 1937), businessman
- Ferdinando Scianna (born 1943), photographer
- Giucas Casella (born 1949), illusionist, hypnotist
- Michele Cucuzza (born 1955), television presenter
- Domenico Dolce (born 1958), fashion designer
- Rosario Fiorello (born 1960), singer, television personality
- Pietro Scalia (born 1960), film editor
- Angelo d'Arrigo (1961–2006), aviator
- Fabrizio Corona (born 1974), photographer, actor, television personality
- Eleonora Abbagnato (born 1978), ballet dancer, model
- TVBoy (born 1980), neo-pop street artist
- Eva Riccobono (born 1983), model
- La Diamond (born 1987), drag queen, winner of Drag Race Italia (season two)
- Diletta Leotta (born 1991), television personality
- Aura Eternal (born 1998), drag queen, finalist of Drag Race Italia (season two)

== Notable people of Sicilian descent by birthplace ==
=== Europe ===
Italy:

- Giulio Raimondo Mazzarino (1602–1661), cardinal and Chief minister of France
- Domenico Scarlatti (1685–1757), composer
- Luigi Almirante (1884–1963), actor
- Giorgio de Chirico (1888–1978), painter
- Totò (1898–1967), actor
- Julius Evola (1898–1974), political philosopher, esotericist, painter
- Giuseppe Giovanni Lanza del Vasto (1901–1981), philosopher, poet, artist
- Pietro Ingrao (1915–2015), politician
- Enrico Maria Salerno (1926–1994), actor
- Emanuele Severino (1929–2020), philosopher
- Bartolomeo Sorge (1929–2020), Jesuit
- Paolo Villaggio (1932–2017), actor
- Sophia Loren (born 1934), actress
- Nicola Cabibbo (born 1935), physicist
- Bettino Craxi (1934–2000), politician, former Prime Minister of Italy
- Giuliano Amato (born 1938), politician, former Prime Minister of Italy
- Giorgio La Malfa (born 1939), politician
- Dario Argento (born 1940), film director
- Vincenzo Cerami (born 1940), screenwriter, novelist and poet
- Gabriele Lavia (born 1942), actor, director
- Toto Cutugno (1943–2023), singer-songwriter
- Beppe Grillo (born 1948), actor and politician
- Gaetano Scirea (1953–1989), footballer
- Francesco Rutelli (born 1954), Mayor of Rome
- Michele Serra (born 1954), writer and journalist
- Ignazio Marino (born 1955), Mayor of Rome
- Salvatore Bagni (born 1956), footballer
- Adolfo Urso (born 1957), politician
- Sergio Scariolo (born 1961), basketball coach
- Amadeus (born 1962), TV presenter
- Antonio Albanese (born 1964), actor
- Paolo Virzì (born 1964), film director, writer, producer
- Lorenza Indovina (born 1966), actress
- Max Gazzè (born 1967), singer-songwriter
- Gianluigi Lentini (born 1969), footballer
- Stefan Schwoch (born 1969), footballer
- Anna Valle (born 1975), actress, model
- Massimo Oddo (born 1976), footballer
- Giorgia Meloni (born 1977), politician
- Luca Argentero (born 1978), actor
- Sebastian Giovinco (born 1987), footballer
- Vito Mannone (born 1988), footballer
- Roberto Gagliardini (born 1994), footballer

Belgium:

- Enzo Scifo (born 1966), footballer, football manager
- Lara Fabian (born 1970), singer
- Silvio Proto (born 1983), footballer

France:

- Jean-Paul Belmondo (born 1933), actor
- Roberto Alagna (born 1963), tenor
- Carmelo Micciche (born 1963), footballer
- Jean Alesi (born 1964), Formula One driver
- Nathalie Cardone (born 1967), actress, singer
- Alexandre del Valle (born 1968), writer, professor, columnist
- Calogero (born 1971), singer
- Fabio Quartararo (born 1999), motorcycle racer

Germany:

- Ralph Giordano (1923–2014), writer
- Lou Bega (born 1975), singer
- Vincenzo Grifo (born 1993), footballer

Spain:

- Adelina Patti (1843–1919), opera singer

Switzerland:

- Sébastien Buemi (1988), Formula One driver

United Kingdom:

- Gia Scala (1934–1972), actress
- Tony Iommi (born 1948), guitarist
- Vincent Riotta (born 1959), actor
- Ronnie O'Sullivan (born 1975), professional snooker player
- Luke Pasqualino (born 1990), actor
- Nico Mirallegro (born 1991), actor
- Alessia Russo (born 1999), footballer

=== Africa ===
Algeria:

- Edwige Fenech (born 1948), actress

Libya:

- Claudio Gentile (born 1953), footballer, football manager

Tunisia:

- Sandra Milo (born 1933), actress
- Claudia Cardinale (born 1938), actress
- Claude Bartolone (born 1951), politician, former President of the National Assembly of France

=== America ===
Argentina:

- Salvador Mazza (1886–1946), physician, epidemiologist
- Argentina Brunetti (1907–2005), actress
- René Favaloro (1923–2000), cardiac surgeon
- Duilio Marzio (1923–2013), actor
- Alfredo Di Stéfano (1926–2014), footballer, football manager
- Carlos Bilardo (born 1939), footballer, football manager
- Alfio Basile (born 1943), footballer, football manager
- Ricardo Bochini (born 1954), footballer
- Martín Palermo (born 1973), footballer
- Gabriel Heinze (born 1978), footballer
- Martín Castrogiovanni (born 1981), rugby union player
- Florencia Bertotti (born 1983), actress, singer
- Javier Mascherano (born 1984), footballer
- Federico Fazio (born 1987), footballer
- Leonel Vangioni (born 1987), footballer

Brazil:

- Ayrton Senna (1960–1994), Formula One driver
- Gabriel Strefezza (born 1997), footballer

Canada:

- Yvonne De Carlo (1987–2007), actress, dancer, singer
- Joey Saputo (born 1964), businessman, sportsman
- Michael Cammalleri (born 1982), ice hockey player
- Carmelina Moscato (born 1984), soccer player
- Michael Cera (born 1994), actor, musician

United States:

- List of Sicilian-Americans

Venezuela:

- Valeria Solarino (born 1978), actress
- Jefferson Savarino (born 1996), footballer

=== Australia ===
Australia:

- Tina Arena (born 1967), singer-songwriter
- Natalie Imbruglia (born 1975), singer, actress
- The Veronicas (born 1984), singers
- Daniel Ricciardo (born 1989), Formula One driver

== See also ==
- Sicilian-Americans
  - List of Sicilian-Americans
