= 1670 in poetry =

This article covers 1670 in poetry. Nationality words link to articles with information on the nation's poetry or literature (for instance, Irish or France).

== Works published ==
=== Other ===
- Sir Richard Fanshawe, translated, Querer por solo querer: To love ony for love sake, translated from Antonio Hurtado de Mendoza
- Fulke Greville, Lord Brooke, The Remains of Sir Fulk Grevill Lord Brooke
- Michael Wigglesworth, Meat Out of the Eater, English Colonial American

=== Other ===
- Francisco de Quevedo, Las tres Musas últimas castellanas ("The last three Castilian Muses"), posthumous, edited by the author's nephew, Pedro Alderete

== Births ==
Death years link to the corresponding "[year] in poetry" article:

- January 2 – Thomas Yalden (died 1736), English poet, translator and clergyman
- January 24 – William Congreve (died 1729), English playwright and poet
- November 15 – Bernard Mandeville (died 1733), English philosopher, political economist, poet and satirist
- Kavi Samrat Upendra Bhanja born either 1670 or 1688 (died 1740), Indian poet of Oriya Literature awarded the title Kavi-Samrata - "The Emperor of the Poets"
- Approximate date – Aogán Ó Rathaille (died 1726), Irish poet, creator of the Aisling poem

== Deaths ==
Birth years link to the corresponding "[year] in poetry" article:

- January 21 – Honorat de Bueil, seigneur de Racan (born 1589), French aristocrat, soldier, poet, dramatist and original member of the Académie française
- March 22 – Petru Fudduni (born 1600), Italian poet writing predominantly in Sicilian
- March 31 – Jacob Westerbaen (born 1599), Dutch poet
- Cheng Zhengkui (born 1604), Chinese landscape painter and poet

== See also ==
- Poetry
- 17th century in poetry
- 17th century in literature
- Restoration literature
