= Petru Fudduni =

Petru Fudduni (c. 1600 in Palermo, Sicily – March 22, 1670) was a poet who wrote predominantly in Sicilian. He was born Pietro Fullone but was generally known by his Sicilian name. He was Sicily's greatest and most famed writer of the 17th century. He represents a literary link between the Sicilian writers Antonio Veneziano, who wrote in the 16th century, and Giovanni Meli and Domenico Tempio, who wrote in the late 18th and early 19th centuries.

The themes of his poetry, if not outright religious in nature, often deal with the mysteries of life and the universe. Yet, like the works of Meli and Nino Martoglio, he was able to tackle such subjects with a great deal of humour and wit.

== Example of his poetry ==
The following sample of poetry illustrates a favourite technique of Fudduni, where he, as a protagonist in the poem, responds to a philosophical question.

Sicilian	English
Petru Fudduni e lu Dottu di Tripi	Petru Fudduni and the Wise Man of Tripi
Lu Dottu:	The Wise Man:
Mi fu mannatu un marzapani chiusu,	A sealed box was sent to me,
di supra scrittu lu O e lu C;	on it was writ an O and a C;
ddà dintra cc'è un domanti priziusu,	within there's a precious stone,
ca ntra lu munnu lu paru nun cc'è;	with no equal in the world;
e nautra cosa a la parti di jusu,	and on the lower part something else,
chi fa lu fruttu e dici a l'omu: te!	that makes fruit and says to man: take!
Petru Fudduni, pueta famusu,	Petru Fudduni, renowned poet,
va sciogghimi stu dubbiu cos'è.	solve this puzzle for me.
Fudduni:	Fudduni:
Lu celu è chiddu marzapanu chiusu,	The sky is that sealed box,
la luna cu lu suli è O e C;	the sun and the moon is O and C;
Diu è lu domanti priziusu,	God is the precious stone,
ca ntra lu munnu lu paru nun cc'è;	with no equal in the world;
la terra è chidda a la parti di jusu,	the Earth is that lower part,
chi fa lu fruttu e dici a l'omu: te!	that makes fruit and says to man: take!
Dottu di Tripi, nun stari cunfusu,	Dottu di Tripi, don't be confused,
ti l'hè sciotu lu dubbiu qual'è.	have I not solved your puzzle.
