= Follow my dreams =

2022 mural by TVBoy in Barcelona

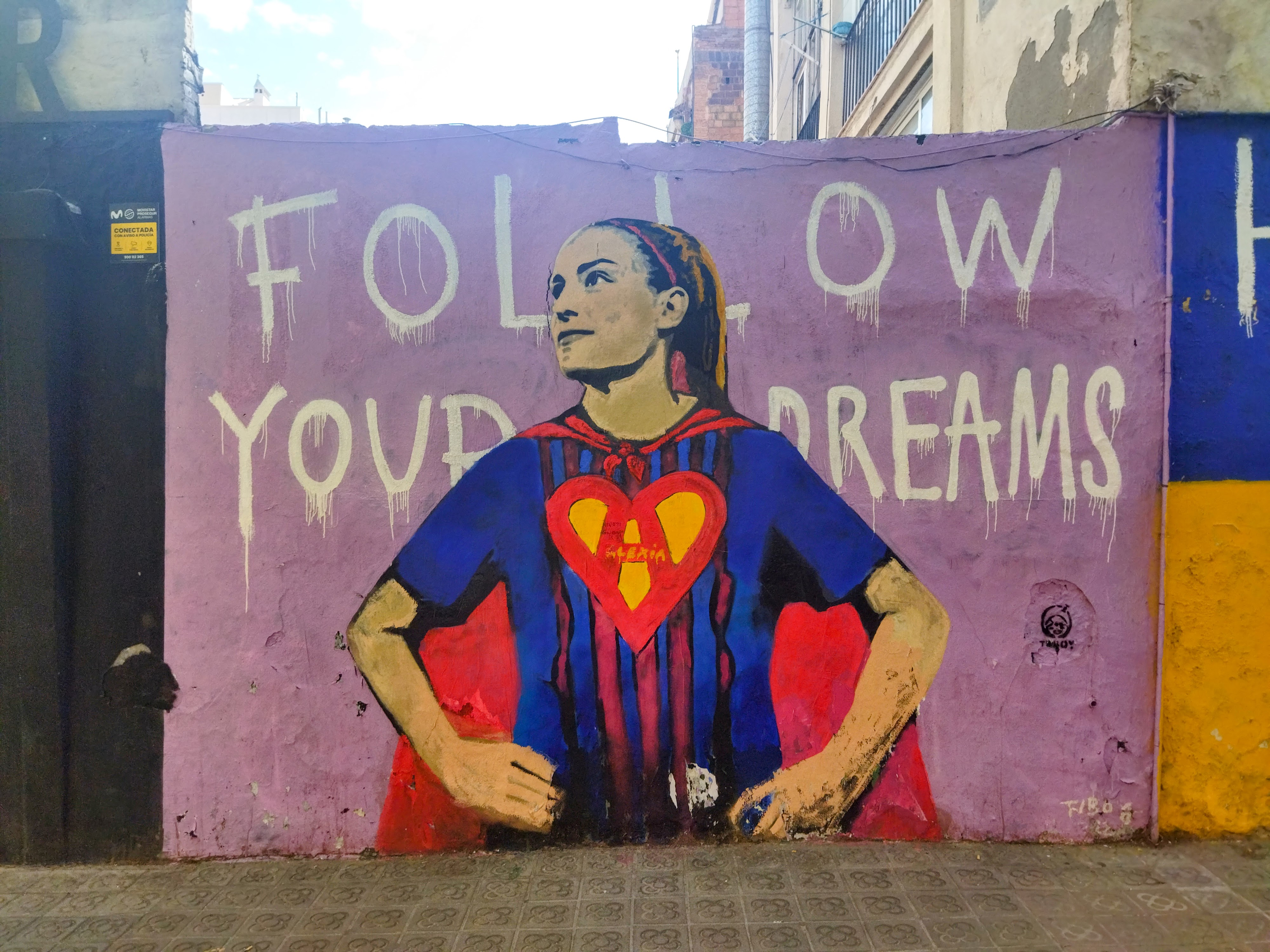
- The mural in May 2023
- Artist: TVBoy
- Year: 2022; re-painted 2023
- Type: Mural
- Location: Gràcia, Barcelona, Spain

Follow my dreams, also known as Super Alexia, was a mural by Italian street artist TVBoy, located in Barcelona. Originally painted in 2022, it depicted footballer Alexia Putellas as Superwoman, celebrating women as well as Putellas' individual and team success. The original was redesigned in 2023, before being replaced in 2024 when TVBoy created a new mural featuring multiple women's footballers (including Putellas as Superwoman) on the wall.

TVBoy was inspired to create the mural by his daughter. It was painted in the Barcelona neighbourhood of Gràcia and was vandalised and repaired several times.

== Background and design ==
Italian street artist TVBoy has been based in Barcelona for many years. In March 2022, TVBoy's young daughter told him that she wanted to be a footballer like Alexia Putellas, the Ballon d'Or winner and captain of FC Barcelona Femení. The team's success in that month and his daughter's words served as inspiration for TVBoy to create a mural of Putellas that would inspire other girls. He unveiled the mural on Father's Day in March 2022. It was located on carrer de l'Escorial (by Joanic) in Gràcia, a neighbourhood in Barcelona that is home to iconic street art and architecture, and that is supportive of feminism and LGBTQ+ rights, reasons TVBoy felt it was ideal for the mural of Putellas.

The location previously featured a different TVBoy mural, of Argentine footballer Diego Maradona painted after his death; the Maradona mural had received some negative responses. TVBoy had painted Maradona as "half saint, half devil" to reflect his issues, but said that when he learned more of Maradona's controversies he wanted to replace it with artwork honouring a woman, that "[he] thought it was a good message that this time a woman was the champion, the star".

Initially, the mural depicted Putellas as Superwoman, wearing a Barcelona shirt with an "A" in a heart on the chest like a superhero crest, and a red cape. The background was lilac to represent feminism and featured the slogan "follow your dreams". In September 2023, following Spain's victory at the 2023 FIFA Women's World Cup and repeated vandalism of the original, TVBoy and his daughter redesigned the mural. In the renovated mural, Putellas was depicted wearing a cape and holding up her hands in the shape of a heart. Her shirt and the background of the mural were painted in blue, red and gold — a mix of the colours of FC Barcelona and the senyera. The slogan was replaced with "Labor omnia vincit improbus", reflecting the title of Putellas' documentary Alexia: Labor Omnia Vincit.

== Vandalism ==
The mural was praised for reflecting in art and society the growing views that "heroes no longer need to be men" and that football is not only for men. Despite Putellas and the mural both being popular in Barcelona, it was vandalised, first in June 2022, with TVBoy fixing it and sharing the message "haters, we never surrender" on social media. In January 2023 it was defaced with graffiti of lesbophobic slurs and misogynistic comments; TVBoy was in Ukraine at the time, but restored it again in February. An image of the vandalised mural was shown at the "Jugo com una nena!" (transl. Play like a girl) exhibition at the Palau Robert in summer 2023, illustrating insults and stereotypes of female athletes. The image is displayed on a wall that is placed as a physical barrier on a running track, which visitors to the exhibition can break down.

The redesigned mural was vandalised in January 2024, with La Vanguardia writing this was because of social tensions over Putellas' increased feminist activism.

== Removal ==
In May 2024, TVBoy created a new mural in honour of the Barcelona Femení team – who that month had won the 2024 UEFA Women's Champions League final to complete a continental quadruple – to replace Follow my dreams. The 2024 mural was described as new; the 2023 redesign had been described by TVBoy as a renovation of the same original mural. The new mural still featured Putellas as Superwoman, also incorporating images of teammates Aitana Bonmatí as Wonder Woman and Salma Paralluelo as Batgirl.
