= Ibn al-Qatta' al-Siqilli =

12th-century Arab philologist and lexicographer

Ibn al-Qatta al-Siqilli
- إبن القطاع الصقلي
- Born: c. 1041; Sicily
- Died: c. 1121

Academic work
- Era: Islamic Golden Age, Emirate of Sicily
- Main interests: philology, linguistics, anthology, lexicography
- Notable works: Al-Durra al-Khatira fi Shu'ara al-Jazira (الدرة الخطيرة في شعراء الجزيرة); ‘The Precious Pearl on the Poets of the Island’

Abū al-Qāsim Alī ibn Jaʿfar ibn Alī ibn Muḥammad al-Saʿdī (Arabic: أبوالقاسم علي بن جعفر بن علي بن محمد السعدي) (c. 433–515 AH; c. AD 1041–1121), also known simply as Ibn al-Qatta' al-Siqilli (إبن القطّاع الصقلي), was a renowned Arab philologist, lexicographer and anthologist of the Arabic language. His work is regarded as one of the major sources which preserve an abundance of knowledge about Arabic Sicilian poetry.

== Biography ==
Ibn al-Qatta' is dated to have been born on the 9th of October in the year 1041 AD (10 Ṣafar c. 433) in the island of Sicily, hence the nisba al-Siqilli. The island at the time was under the rule of the Kalbids' Emirate of Sicily. He was a descendant of the 9th-century rulers of Ifriqiya (Eastern Maghreb) the Aghlabids. The Aghlabids were the first Muslim dynasty to successfully seize control of the island of Sicily from the Byzantine Empire in 827. Ibn al-Qatta' came from a noble and learned family. For instance, his father, grandfather and great-grandfather were all renowned for their interest in literature and knowledge. Ibn al-Qatta studied in Sicily under several scholars of the island and he composed an encyclopedia of the works of 170 Sicilian-Arab poets, by the title of al-Durra al-Khatira fi Shu'ara al-Jazira (الدرة الخطيرة في شعراء الجزيرة; The Precious Pearl on the Poets of the Island)

== See also ==
- List of pre-modern Arab scientists and scholars
- List of people from Sicily
