= Gaspare Mignosi =

Italian mathematician (1875–1951)

Gaspare Mignósi (1875, Palermo – 1951, Palermo) was an Italian mathematician.

Mignosi became in 1930 a professor of mathematical analysis at the University of Cagliari and in 1932 a professor at the University of Palermo. He continued the studies of the school of algebraic geometry and number theory, which flourished in Sicily around 1920 with Gaetano Scorza and Michele Cipolla. Particularly noteworthy is the contribution made by Mignosi to the so-called apiristic solution of binomial congruences.

Mignosi determined the fundamental subgroups of the linear projective group of dimension two over a field.

He was an Invited Speaker of the ICM in 1928 in Bologna.

== Selected publications ==
- "Teorema di Sturm e sue estensioni." Rendiconti del Circolo Matematico di Palermo (1884–1940) 49, no. 1 (1925): 1–159. doi:10.1007/BF03014715
- "La Convergenza in un campo d’integrità finito e la risoluzione apiristica delle congruenze." Rendiconti del Circolo Matematico di Palermo (1884–1940) 50, no. 2 (1926): 245–253. doi:10.1007/BF03014731
- "Risoluzione apiristica della equazione generale cubica in un corpo numerico finito." Rendiconti del Circolo Matematico di Palermo (1884–1940) 53, no. 1 (1929): 411–427. doi:10.1007/BF03024113
- "Sulla equazione dell’Ottica." Rendiconti del Circolo Matematico di Palermo (1884–1940) 55, no. 1 (1931): 456–476. doi:10.1007/BF03016811
- "I campi d’integrità finiti di 1^{a} specie contenenti un corpo." Rendiconti del Circolo Matematico di Palermo (1884–1940) 56, no. 1 (1932): 161–208. doi:10.1007/BF03017716
- "Sui campi d’integrità di specie qualunque e su quelli di 2^{a} specie contenenti un corpo." Rendiconti del Circolo Matematico di Palermo (1884–1940) 57, no. 1 (1933): 357–401. doi:10.1007/BF03017584
- "Sulle caratteristiche delle matrici." Rendiconti del Seminario Matematico della Università di Padova 13 (1942): 26–29.
