= Francesco Strano =

Italian scholar

Francesco Strano (1766– September 1831) was an Italian scholar, priest, and librarian, known for his extensive cataloguing of the large book collection, donated by Bishop Salvatore Ventimiglia to the University of Catania in Sicily.

== Biography ==
He was born in Aci-Catena near Catania in Sicily, he began by studying classics and humanities in Catania, where he was made a professor. He continued on to get a doctorate in Theology, and became a priest. In 1817, was made canon and superintendent of the Biblioteca Ventimigliana. By 1830, he had completed a 530-page index of all the works, a parallel for the works in this collection to the work Mare Magnum by Francesco Marucelli's produced for the Biblioteca Marucelliana of Florence.
