= Antonio Veneziano (poet) =

Italian poet

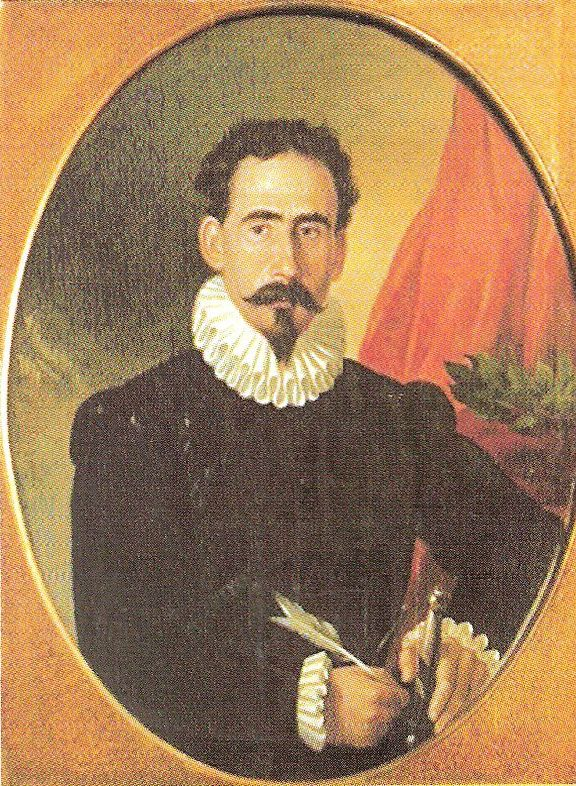
- Portrait of Antonio Veneziano by Salvatore Giaconia (1825-1899), Monreale City Hall
- Born: 7 January 1543; Monreale, Kingdom of Sicily
- Died: 19 August 1593 (aged 50); Palermo, Kingdom of Sicily
- Occupation: poet
- Known for: Sicilian poetry

Antonio Veneziano explained why he wrote in Sicilian:
Omeru nun scrissi pi grecu chi fu grecu, o Orazziu pi latinu chi fu latinu?
E siddu Pitrarca chi fu tuscanu nun si piritau di scrìviri pi tuscanu, pirchì ju avissi a èssiri evitatu, chi sugnu sicilianu, di scrìviri pi sicilianu?
Haiu a fàrimi pappagaddu di la lingua d’àutri?
(Translation:) Did not Homer, who was Greek, write in Greek, or Horace, who was Roman, write in Latin?
And if Petrarch, who is Tuscan, does not resile from writing in Tuscan, why should I be restrained, being a Sicilian, from writing in Sicilian?
Must I parrot the languages of others?

Antonio Veneziano (1543 - 19 August 1593) was an Italian poet who wrote mainly in the Sicilian language. He is considered among the greatest poets who wrote in Sicilian, which include Giovanni Meli, Domenico Tempio and Nino Martoglio. He is perhaps the first major figure in Sicilian literature following the Sicilian School which predates him by three centuries. During his lifetime, he was well known for his poetry both within Sicily and far beyond. He also wrote in Italian and Latin.

Veneziano was born in Monreale, a contemporary of the great Spanish writer Miguel de Cervantes (Sicily was under Spanish rule at this time). As it happens, both shared a cell after being captured by Barbary pirates around 1575. He wrote his greatest work, Celia during his period of imprisonment in Algeria (he was released in 1579). Cervantes is reported as having said that Veneziano had earned a passage to Paradise through this collection of poems (Celia means a jest or joke in both Sicilian and Italian). He wrote other works of poetry, also delving in satire and bawdy rhymes. He died in Palermo.

When once asked why he chose to write in Sicilian rather than a recognised literary language such as Italian or Spanish, he replied to the effect that if a man is to seduce a woman, he must do so in her mother tongue. It is unclear whether a pun was intended.

The whole of his works were assembled in 1967 in a publication entitled: Ottave, edited by A. Rigoli.

== Examples of his poetry ==
Some extracts from his collection, Celia, appear below (circa 1575 - 1580). While the subject matter of the first poem, love, is typical enough of early Sicilian poetry, the second is a bit more atypical, possessing a whimsical quality.

=== No. vii ===
Non è xhiamma ordinaria, no, la mia
è xhiamma chi sul'iu tegnu e rizettu,
xhiamma pura e celesti, ch'ardi 'n mia;
per gran misteriu e cu stupendu effettu.
Amuri, 'ntentu a fari idulatria,
s'ha novamenti sazerdoti elettu;
tu, sculpita 'ntra st'alma, sì la dia;
sacrifiziu lu cori, ara stu pettu.

Translation:

No, mine is no ordinary flame
it's a flame that only I possess and oversight,
a pure celestial flame that in me burns;
by a great mystery and with great effect.
Love, wanting to worship idols,
has once again become a high priest;
you, sculpted in this soul, are the goddess;
my heart is the victim, my breast is the altar.

=== No. viii ===
In parti dubbiu e in parti sicuru,
fra lu zertu e l'inzertu scurru e penzu,
contemplu ora lu chiaru, ora lu scuru,
e dugnu or'unu ed ora un autru senzu;
pisu, assuttighiu, bilanzu, misuru,
criju, non criju, risolvu e ripenzu,
ogn'hura penzu e guastu, muru e smuru,
e sempri ddà finixxu, undi 'ncumenzu.

Translation:

Half of me doubting and half of me sure,
between the certain and uncertain I think and wonder,
I contemplate first the bright and then the dark,
and I mean first one thing and then another;
I weigh, I abstract, I balance, I measure,
I believe, I disbelieve, I resolve and I think anew,
each hour I conceive and destroy, do and undo,
and always end up being where I began.
