= Cataldo Parisio =

Sicilian humanist, writer and diplomat

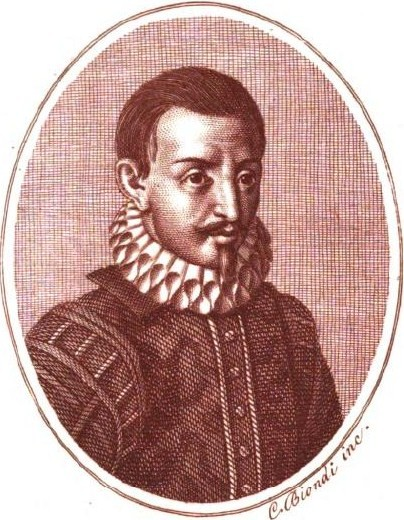
- Born: 1455; Palermo or Sciacca, Kingdom of Sicily
- Died: 1517 (aged 61–62); Lisbon, Kingdom of Portugal
- Other name: Cataldo Siculo
- Occupations: humanist, writer, diplomat
- Known for: Pioneer of the Humanism in Portugal

Giovanni Cataldo Parisio, commonly known as Cataldo Parisio or Cataldo Siculo, (c. 1455 in Palermo or Sciacca – 1517 in Lisbon) was a Sicilian humanist, writer and diplomat. He introduced the humanist culture in Portugal and became the secretary of king John II of Portugal for writing Latin missives to popes, kings, and princes among others.
