= Corrado Galzio =

Italian musician (1919–2020)

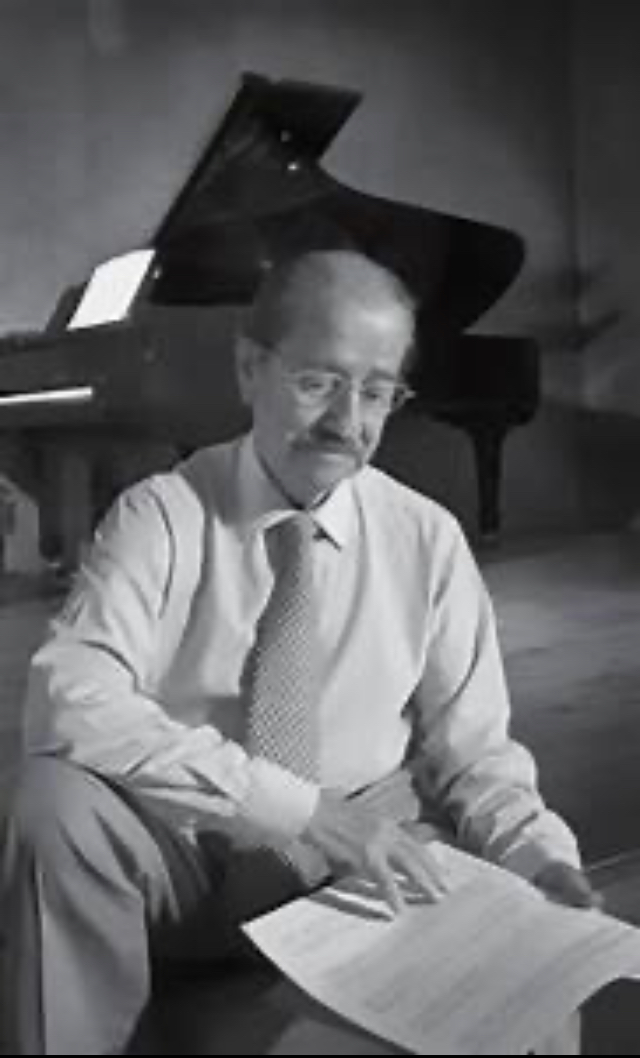
Corrado Galzio

Corrado Galzio, (Italian pronunciation: [korˈraːdo ˈɡaltsjo]; Noto, November 3, 1919 – Noto, April 19, 2020) was a noted musician and piano player who founded the International Music Festival of Noto and the Italian Music Conservatory in Caracas. He promoted the popularization of musical culture as well as initiating the interchanges between Italy and Venezuela. In Venezuela, he carried out an intense career as an artist, teacher, and director of successful radio and television programmes. He is widely recognised as the father of chamber music culture in the Latin American country.

== The first years and the war (1919–1947) ==
Corrado Galzio was born in Noto, a small city located in southern Sicily, a UNESCO World Heritage Site, globally recognized for the value of its baroque architecture. He began studying the piano in Noto when still very young, under the guidance of Maestro Giuseppe Scopa. At the age of eight years old, he moved to Milan in order to pursue his studies. From there, he completed his musical education in Rome, at the Santa Cecilia Conservatory under the guidance of Maestro Renzo Silvestri. His artistic merits, representing life in Italy at the time, stood out from others. For Radio Roma, he implemented a live classical music programme, the first of its kind, and was awarded the Premio Littoriale for piano in 1940. In the same year, he went to war as a volunteer.

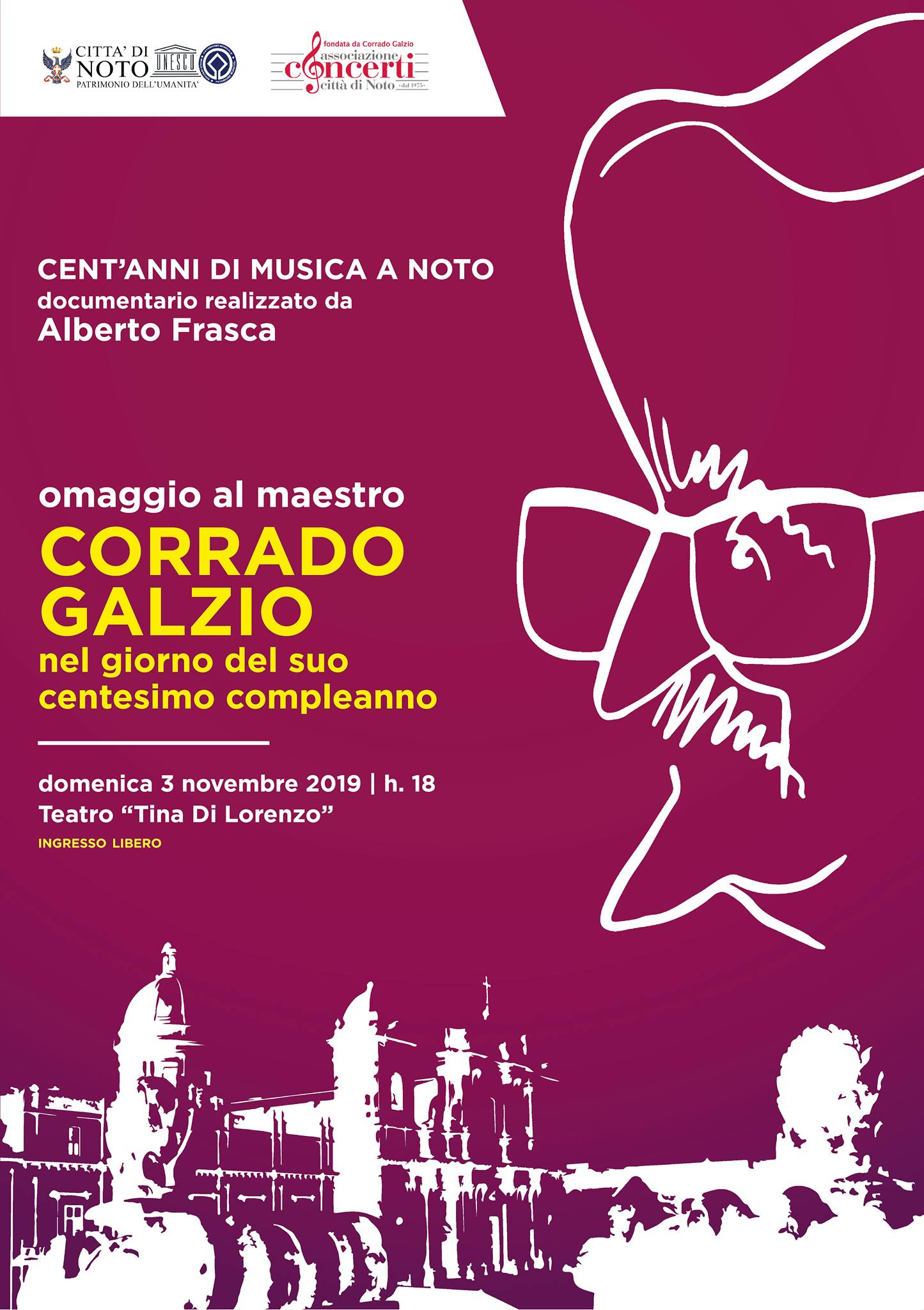
Corrado Galzio 100 birthday poster

== Venezuela (1947–2020) ==
In 1947, Galzio emigrated to Venezuela. His first years of activity in this new country were marked by a pioneering fervor. He taught in Maracaibo at the Music Academy, and in San Cristobal, was the director of the State Conservatory. While in Caracas, Galzio founded the Italian Music Conservatory and the Monte Sacro Cultural Centre, which was a venue for concerts and meetings with personalities of the international music scene. Eminent Italian colleagues from the Santa Cecilia Academy, one of the oldest musical institutions in the world, answered his calls. Their cooperation and performances brought prestige to the Conservatory, and with these musicians, he undertook an intense concert activity that had him performing on the stages of the world. The Monte Sacro Cultural Centre is still hosting the Caracas Symphonic Municipal Orchestra.

In 1952, he founded the radio programme Temas con Variaciones, which, with the advent of television, would be broadcast live on the most important national television channel as well. Temas con Variaciones spread all over the country and aired the live concerts of various chamber ensembles created and led by Maestro Galzio. The programme also presented interviews with the most well-known and popular celebrities from Europe and America on cultural and current events topics. Radio Capital Caracas continues broadcasting Temas con Variaciones even today, now edited by Professor Einar Goyo Ponte from the University Andrés Bello. Due to its long and unbroken activity, this broadcast constitutes one of the country's oldest and most prominent cultural institutions.

== Concert activity ==
His radio commitment and the management of various musical institutions in Italy and in Venezuela have always been associated with Maestro Corrado Galzio. In addition, he had a strong commitment to an intense concert activity that brought him to perform with many international exponents of chamber music, among them Gaspar Cassadó, Antonio Yanigro, Ricardo Odnoposoff, Dino Asciolla, Berle Senofsky, Suna Kan, Uto Ughi, Corrado Romano, Michel Rabin, lona Brown, Thèrèse Green-Coleman, Lisa Della Casa, Salvatore Accardo, Ruggero Ricci, Christian Ferras, and Pierre Fournier.

With the Santa Cecilia Academy musicians, Maestro Galzio gave birth to many chamber ensembles, including the Galzio Quartet, the Ensemble, The Santa Cecilia Soloists. These were groups featuring a free structure, open to various chamber music combinations, like trios, quartets, quintets, and sextets. With these groups, he toured Europe, Latin America, South Asia, the Middle East, the Soviet Union, the United States, and China, always achieving great success with audiences and critics alike.

Corrado Galzio's commitment to spreading the compositions of Venezuelan authors has been consistent. In his concerts, besides the great classic repertoire (Bartok, Beethoven, Brahms, Chopin, Debussy, De Falla, Donizetti, Dvorák, Fauré, Franck, Grieg, Glinka, Gluck, Mozart, Mendelssohn, Prokofiev, Ravel, Schubert, Schumann, Stravinsky, and Tartini), he always included works by Venezuelan composers like Blanca Estrella, Reynaldo Hahn, Rhazés Hernández López, and Juan Bautista Plaza.

Renowned composers such as Primo Casale, Raffaele Gervasio, Nino Rota, Ennio Morricone, Stefano Sollima, Giovanni Ferrauto and Blanca Estrella have written and dedicated original pieces to Corrado Galzio.

== The Concerts Association, the International Music Festival, the School of Strings ==
Galzio firmly believed that "there is no culture without musical culture," and in 1975 founded the City of Noto Concerts Association. His intent behind this association was to stimulate artistic life, revitalizing his musical tradition in his original hometown. There are multiple examples of his commitment, including the International Notomusica Festival in summer, the Concert Season year-round, various concerts in the schools and nearby small villages, and the Music Didactics courses. Year after year, from 1975 up until today, the Festival, which guarantees attendance at the city for quality cultural tourism, is an unmissable event for people that love great classical music. Having reached its 45th edition, this Festival has had internationally renowned artists and orchestral ensembles. Many soloists from the Santa Cecilia Academy, among whom are Vincenzo Mariozzi, Ugo Gennarini, Nicolae Sarpe, Antonio Salvatore, and Fausto Anzelmo, have also performed in Noto, as well as Salvatore Accardo, Bruno Canino, Alirio Díaz, Suna Kan, Katia and Marielle Labèque, Franco Maggio Ormezowski, Antonio Pappano, Katia Ricciarelli, Ruggero Ricci, and Uto Ughi.

The Festival has also hosted famous jazz performers and soundtrack authors like Ennio Morricone, Luis E. Bacalov, Stefano Bollani, Dee Dee Bridgewater, Paolo Fresu, Richard Galliano, Rosario Giuliani, Enrico Rava, Danilo Rea, and Peppe Servillo. In addition to the Italian and European orchestras, among which are the Vincenzo Bellini Orchestra from Teatro Massimo, the Turin Chamber Orchestra, and the European Community Chamber Orchestra, many Venezuelan artists and orchestral ensembles also have taken part in the Festival. Orquesta Sinfónica Simón Bolívar, Teresa Carreño Youth Orchestra, Orquesta Sinfónica Municipal de Caracas, the Orquesta Sinfónica Venezuela, and the Orquesta Sinfónica de Maracaibo, are just a few of these, confirming the deep bond the maestro has with his adopted country.

In 1997, Corrado Galzio founded the Noto School of Strings, providing new life to the school of strings that was established in the 1930s by his maestro, Giuseppe Scopa, to whom he wanted to pay homage. The school consists of two violin classes, one class of complementary piano, and a boy's soprano class of around fifty students aged from seven to twelve years. It is totally free of charge and corresponds to the "Musical Literacy" mission pursued by Maestro Galzio.

== The final years ==
In 2006, at eighty six years of age, the Maestro performed in Turkey, Pakistan, and Germany with an Ensemble consisting of Ugo Gennarini on clarinet, Francesco Sorrentino on cello, and Mariam Dal Don on violin. His last public performance happened in 2015, on the occasion of the 40th anniversary of the Festival, where the maestro performed a composition that Raffaele Gervasio, in the early stages of his concert career, had dedicated to him.

On November 3, 2019, the city of Noto celebrated the one-hundredth birthday of the maestro with a great ceremony organized by the Municipal Administration and the City of Noto Concerts Association, held at the Tina Di Lorenzo theatre. During the event, the Mayor of Noto, paid tribute to the Maestro piano player, founder of the Noto Musica Festival, in the name of the city. The president of the Concerts Association, Alberto Frasca, retraced the musical history of these one hundred years at Noto that intertwines with the biography of the maestro. The evening ended with the video message wishes by Salvatore Accardo, Uto Ughi , Ennio Morricone, and with the reading of a tribute by the Santa Cecilia Academy masters, touring companions, and the Venezuelan Embassy in Italy.

Corrado Galzio died in his Sicilian hometown of Noto on April 19, 2020.

To Corrado Galzio was dedicated the City of Noto Musical School at the initiative of Mayor Corrado Bonfanti, who wanted to acknowledge the huge musical heritage that the Maestro conveyed in his one hundred years of life.

As an affectionate remembrance, these articles have been published in Italy and in Venezuela.

The Tema con variaciones radio programme dedicated a special broadcast to him that featured a selection of his musical performances.

== Awards ==
Knight of the Italian Republic, 1956 Award

Oleandro D'Oro from Noto Municipality, 1997

Italia nel Mondo, 1998 Award

Noto Excellence Award, 2015

Andrés Bello Award (1978 and 1995) for his contribution to Venezuela cultural development

Orden Francisco de Miranda acknowledging his contribution to the country advancement

L'Ordre du Merite Culturel from Polish People's Republic for his contribution and dissemination of Polish culture and art

== Bibliography ==
The life and activity of Maestro Galzio have been documented in two books and in an academic article:

Michele Castelli, La vida fantástica de Corrado Galzio, Caracas, Editorial Melvin, 2008, with foreword by the historian and former president of Venezuela, Ramón José Velásquez.

Guadalupe Burelli, Italia y Venezuela: 20 Testimonios, Caracas, Fundación para la Cultura Urbana, 2008.

Michele Castelli, Gli Italiani in Venezuela: un Patrimonio da Difendere, Limes – Rivista di Geopolitica, n. 3, 2019, pp 135–141 .

Some live recordings of the most significant concerts by Maestro Galzio have been published.

== Discography ==
A wide selection of Galzio's releases can be listened to for free from his label's website: https://www.italiamondocultura.com/discografia-collezione/

=== Selected releases ===
Year of Release	Title	Label	Format	Notes
2005	Quartetto Galzio di Caracas - Brahms, Fauré	Italia Mondo Cultura	CD	Copenhagen, 20 May 1976 - Corrado Galzio (piano) - Olaf Ilznis (violin) - Mario Mescoli (viola) - Antonietta Franzosa (cello) - Bespoke Caricatures by caricaturist RAS (Eduardo Robles Piquer)
2006	Suna Kan & Corrado Galzio Brahams, Grieg, Bartok, Dvorak	Italia Mondo Cultura	CD	Live 1983, Messina
2006	Salvatore Accardo & Corrado Galzio: Schuman, Schubert, Mozart	Fonè	CD	Live recording Caracas 17 November 1973
2014	Accardo - Galzio in Concerto Tartini Schumann Brahms Ravel Wieniawski Dinicu	Italia Mondo Cultura	CD	Live Recording Pieve a Elici (Lucca), 7 September 1972 & Florence 10th September 1972

== Legacy ==
From his first years in Venezuela onwards, Corrado Galzio was part of the group of avant-garde artists who emigrated to the Latin American country after the tragic events of the Second World War. Among them was painter and sculptor Giorgio Gori, Czech painter Guillermo Heiter, Italian composer Primo Casale, Czech violinist Emil Friedman, Italian architect Graziano Gasparini, Spanish architect and caricaturist Eduardo Robles Piquer (known in art as RAS) and many others. The immigration of European artistic talents was part of the cultural development policy of the Venezuelan Republic under President Marcos Pérez Jiménez.

Today Venezuela boasts some of the most important classical music institutions in the world. These include the numerous orchestras that, since the 1960s, have sprung up in the country at municipal, state and international level. During the years of his activity, Galzio, in collaboration with several prominent Venezuelan and European colleagues, worked tirelessly to select musical talents from the orchestras of El Sistema and other programmes to introduce them to prestigious cameristic formations in Europe and Latin America.
