= TVBoy =

Italian street artist (born 1980)

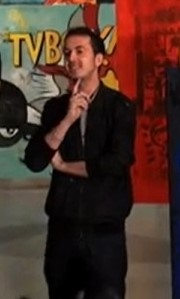
- TVBoy in front of some of his images in 2010
- Born: Salvatore Benintende; 16 July 1980 (age 46); Palermo, Italy
- Known for: Street art
- Movement: Neo-pop

Salvatore Benintende (born 16 July 1980), known by the pseudonym TVBoy (rendered with various capitalisations), is an Italian neo-pop street artist. He is known for his murals depicting footballers and current affairs, particularly George Floyd following his murder, Vladimir Putin following Russia's invasion of Ukraine in 2022, and Alexia Putellas following her first Ballon d'Or Féminin win. Having begun his work in street art in 1996, he has been described as "the Banksy of Barcelona", one of the cities, along with Palermo and Milan, he is known for decorating.

== Career ==
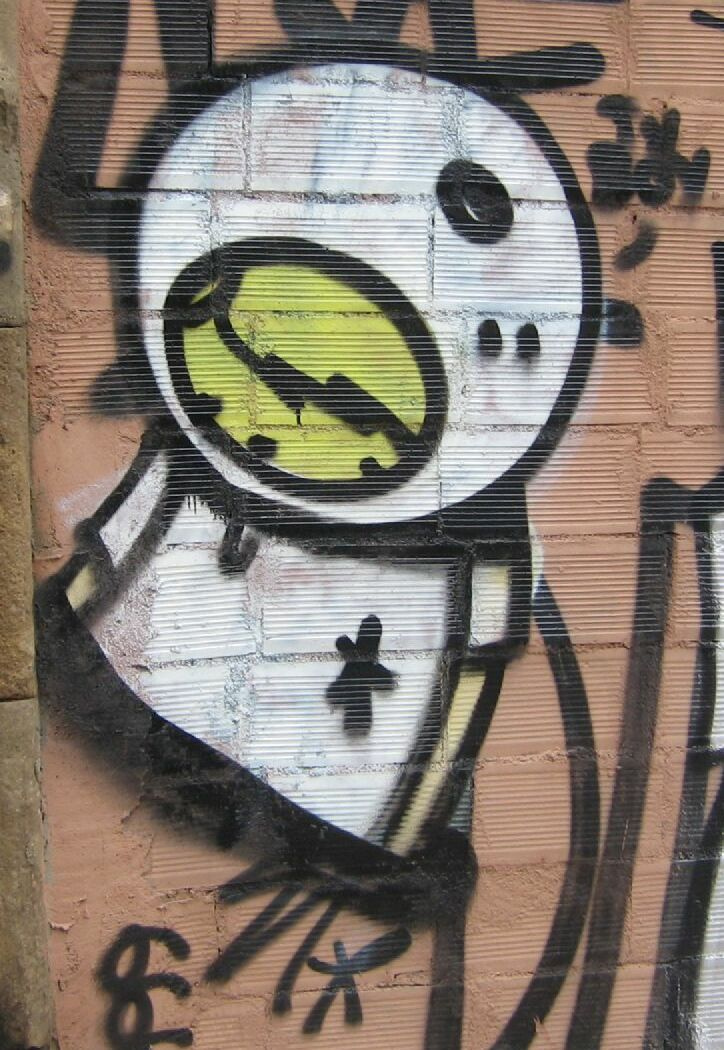
TVBoy character in Barcelona in 2005

TVBoy's works often depict current affairs. Many of his large murals are done in Gràcia, a location of much artistic culture in the city. Some of his art is dedicated to local icons, including painting Montserrat Caballé and Pau Donés after their deaths.

In his pieces relating to football, he has painted Lionel Messi, described as a muse, many times. He also created a mural of Diego Maradona after his death, though, proving controversial, TVBoy replaced it with Super Alexia, depicting women's footballer Alexia Putellas. He added another mural of Messi after he won the 2022 FIFA World Cup.

His first official gallery show in Barcelona was Home Street Home, held in 2021 at the Casa Seat.

He has created many murals to reflect support of Ukraine following the 2022 Russian invasion of Ukraine, including in the Kyiv region and around Barcelona. In Barcelona, next to his mural of Putellas is one of a Ukrainian flag bearing the word "hope" with an image of a girl making its letter "O" into a peace symbol, and on one panel in Plaça Sant Jaume, the centre of Catalonia, he has created and updated various murals, depicting images including Ukrainian president Volodymyr Zelenskyy calling for an end to war; children planting a peace flag on a Russian tank; and Russian president Vladimir Putin incarcerated. The panel was later removed during façade renovations. In January 2023, he was invited by humanitarian organisation Cesvi to travel to Bucha and Irpin in Ukraine's Kyiv oblast, sites of the Bucha massacre and Battle of Irpin, to create art to bring positivity as the nation approached a year of war. Combining football and the war in Ukraine, one of his murals depicts children playing football wearing jerseys with the numbers 20 and 23, and the names "peace" and "hope". His other murals in Ukraine depict children, too, as well as flowers and the colours of the Ukrainian flag.

In 2025, TVBoy created a mural in Rome depicting Pope Leo XIV wearing a Chicago Bulls jersey to honor Leo as the first American Pope and to represent his origins in Chicago.

== Exhibitions ==
- Please Don't Die, 2007, Iguapop Gallery Barcelona
- 2007, Padiglione d'Arte Contemporanea
- 2008, Parco della Musica
- 2008, Asbæk Gallery
- 2008, Aïshti Foundation
- Street Art Painting, 2009, Internationales Schulungszentrum (collection of many artists)
- Reality Pop, 2010, Gestalt Gallery (collection of many artists)
- Superheroes 2.0, 2014, Gestalt Gallery (collection of many artists)
- Home Street Home, 2021, Casa Seat de Barcelona
- Jago, Banksy, TvBoy e altre storie controcorrente, November 2022–May 2023, Palazzo Albergati (collection of works by Jago, Banksy, and TVBoy)

== Gallery ==
Select TVBoy works in Spain
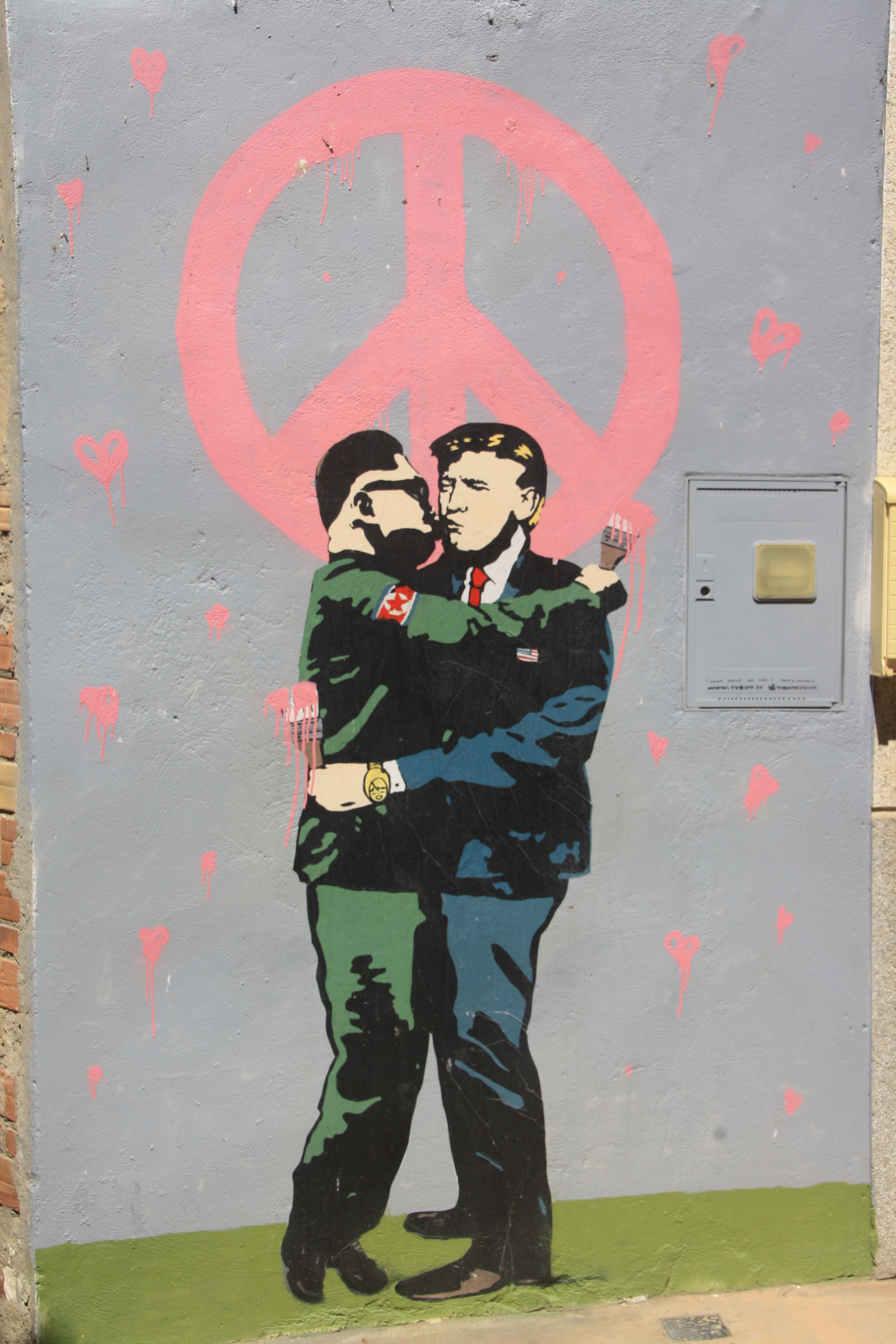
Mural in Penelles (Lleida) depicting Kim Jong Un and Donald Trump kissing

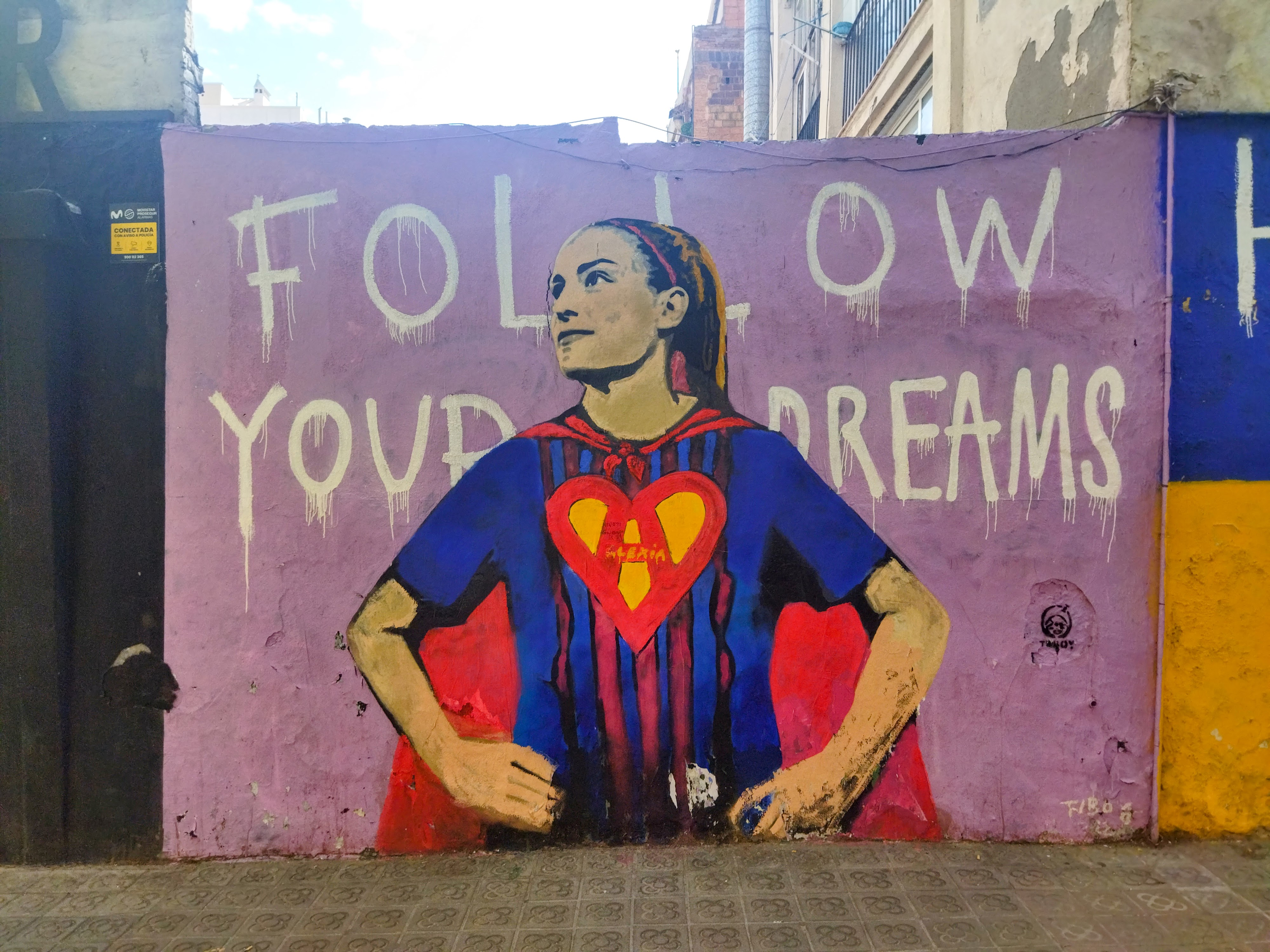
Super Alexia, mural in Gràcia (Barcelona) depicting Alexia Putellas as Superwoman

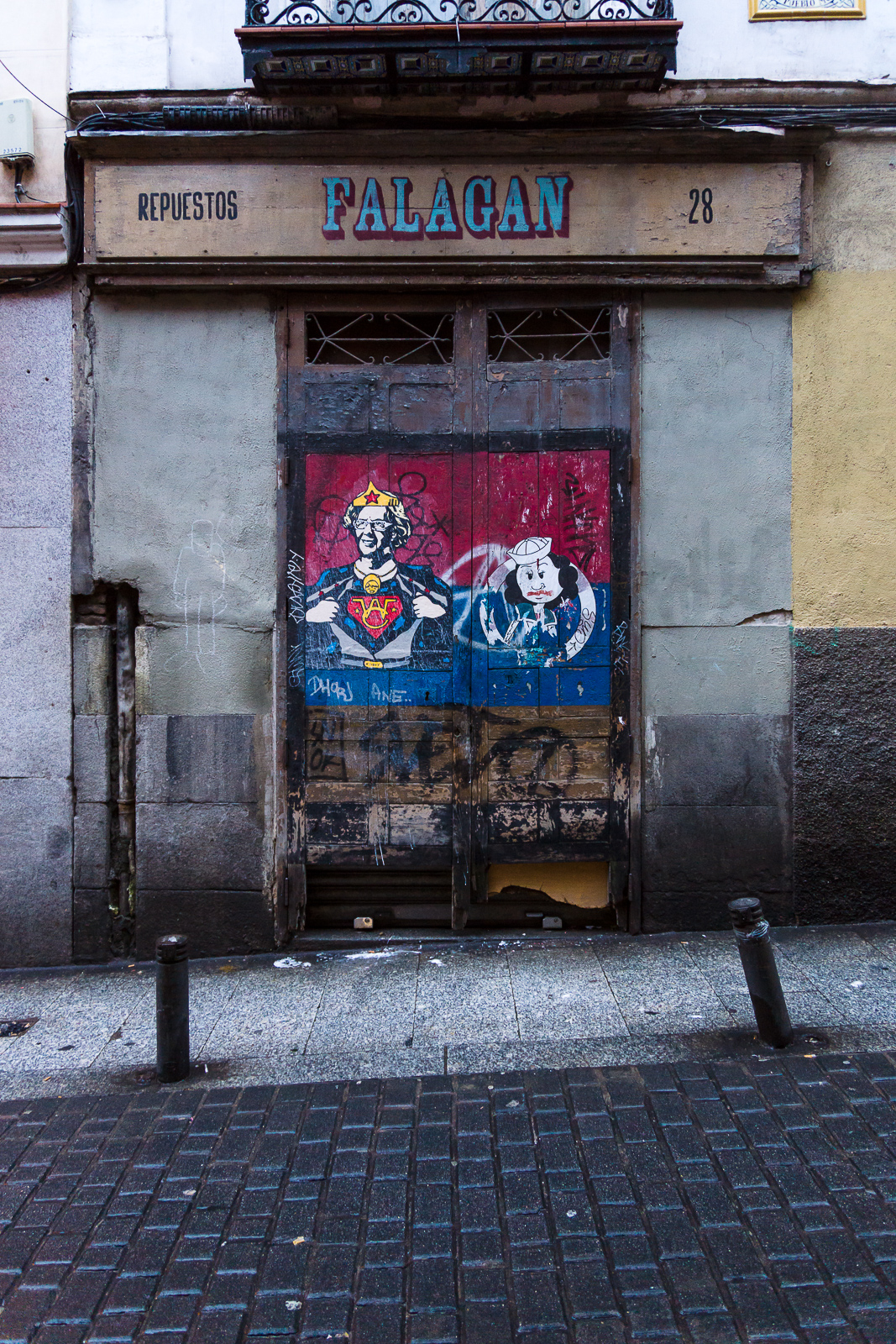
A mural in Madrid depicting Manuela Carmena as Wonder Woman

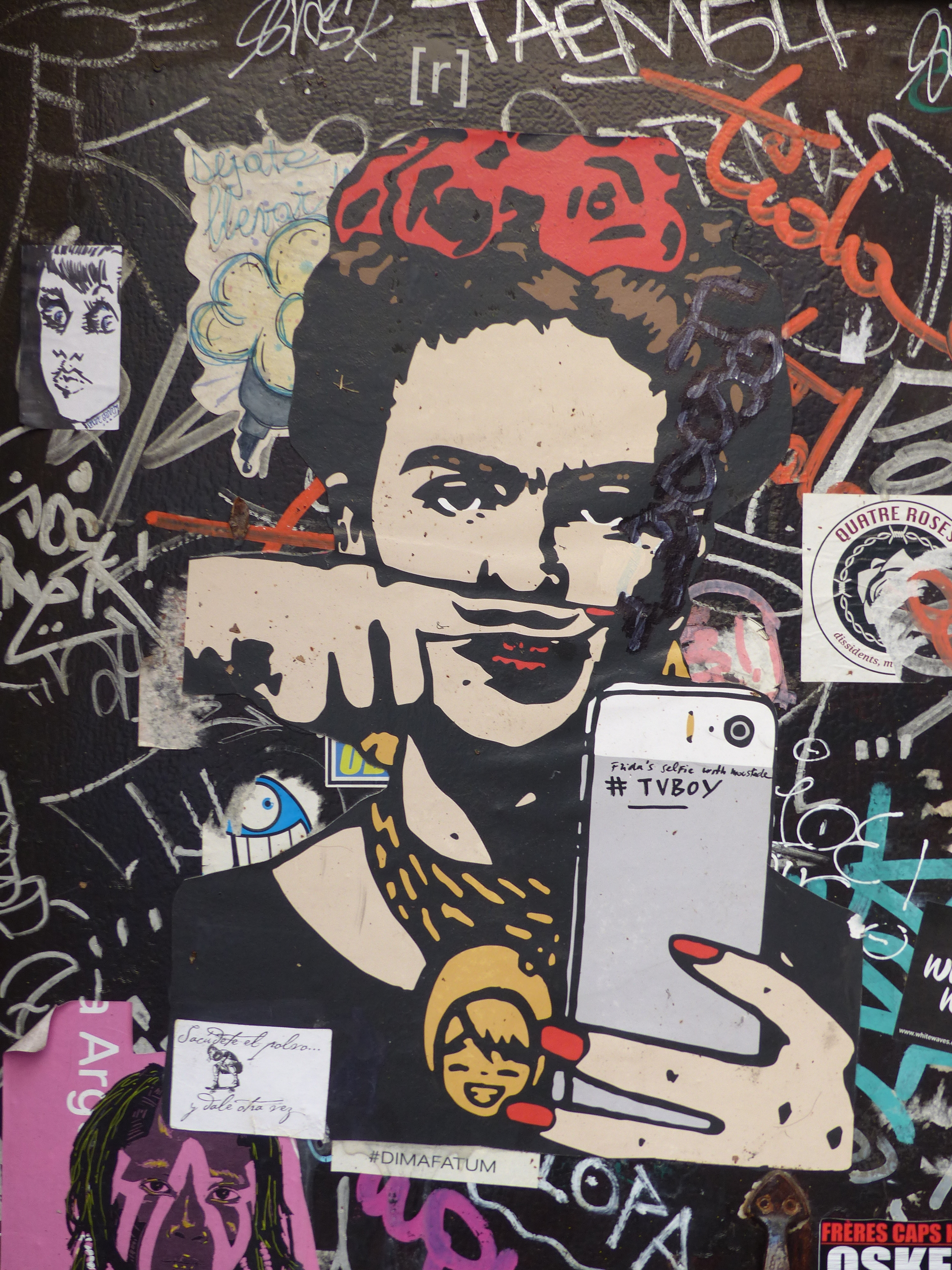
Artwork in Barcelona of Frida Kahlo with a finger moustache tattoo taking a selfie

== Personal life ==
He has a daughter.
