= Phrygillus =

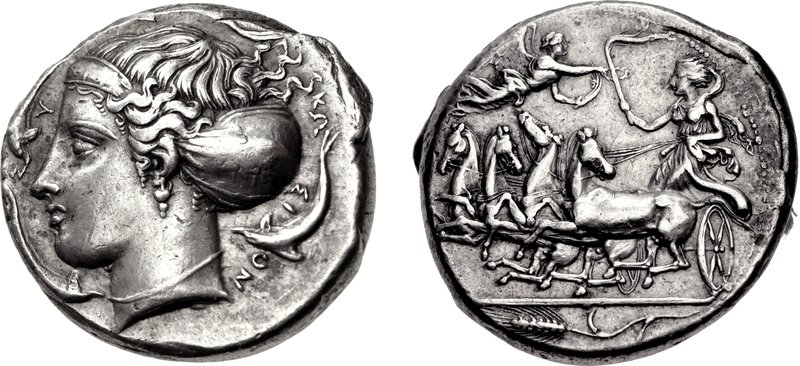
Syracusae: Tetradrachm
Head of Arethusa, hair in ampyx with ΦΡΥ on the front; Σ-Y-[P]-A-ΚΩ-ΣΙ-ΩΝ and four dolphins around	Charioteer, driving fast quadriga left; above, Nike flying right; in exergue, grain ear left
AR Tetradrachm (25mm, 17.31 g, 12h)

Phrygillus, was an ancient Greek artist of Magna Graecia, who appears to have been one of the most ancient, as well as one of the most celebrated medallists and engravers of precious stones.

There is a very beautiful intaglio by him, representing Love seated and supporting himself on the ground, in the attitude of those figures of boys playing the game of astragals, which so often occurs in the works of ancient art. The form of the letters of the name ΦΡVΓΙΛΛ, the large size of the wings of the figure of Love, and the whole style of the gem, concur to show that the artist belonged to the earlier Greek school. There is also engraved upon this gem a bivalve shell, which also occurs on the coins of Syracuse; whence it may be inferred that the artist was a Syracusan. This conjecture becomes a certainty through the fact, recently published by Raoul-Rochette, that there exist medals of Syracuse, on which the name of Phrygillus is inscribed. One medal of this type is in the possession of R. Rochette himself, who has given an engraving of it on the title-page of his Lettre a M. Schorn, by the side of an engraving of the gem already mentioned. Another medal of this type is in the collection of the Duc de Luynes. The same collection contains another very beautiful Syracusan medal, in bronze, bearing the inscription ΦΡΥ, which no one can now hesitate to recognise as the initial letters of the name Phrygillus. Raoul-Rochette accounts these three medals to be among the most precious remains of ancient numismatic art.

The identification, in this instance, of a distinguished medallist and gem-engraver, goes far to settle the question, which has been long discussed, whether those professions were pursued by the same or by different classes of artists among the Greeks
