= Domenico Tempio =

Italian writer

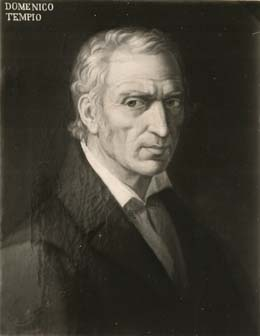
- Portrait of Domenico Tempio by Giuseppe Gandolfo
- Born: August 22, 1750; Catania
- Died: February 4, 1821 (aged 70); Catania
- Language: Italian/Sicilian
- Spouse: Francesca Longo
- Children: one daughter

Domenico Tempio (1750–1821) was an Italian writer who mainly wrote in the Sicilian language or dialect. During his lifetime, he was considered a major poet, and was much praised, but after his death his work was largely forgotten, until a reawakening of interest following the second world war. His poem La Caristia ("The famine"), describing a famine and rioting in Catania in 1797–98, is regarded as his major work.

== Works ==
- Operi di Duminicu Tempiu catanisi (1814-1815) is a collection of his poetry, edited by Francesco Strano. The best-known poems are L'Odi l'Ignuranza Supra, The Maldicenza sconfitta, Veru Piaciri Lu, The Mbrugghereidi, The Numi Scerra di li, Lu cuntrastu allayed, Paci di Marcuni, Li and Li Pauni Nuzzi.
- La Caristia (1848), is his most important work, published posthumously by Vincenzo Percolla. It is a poem in twenty cantos.
- Tempio di Domenico Poesie (1874) is the second edition of his works, with many additions.
- Erotic poetry was collected in 1926 by Raffaele Corso Di Vincenzo and by Maria and Santo Cali in 1970.
