= Sicilian orthography =

Alphabet variant

Sicilian orthography uses a variant of the Latin alphabet consisting of 23 or more letters to write the Sicilian language.

== History ==
Since the emergence of the modern Romance-based Sicilian language in the early 1st millennium, several orthographic systems for writing the language have existed. With the gradual increase in the power of Italian, the Sicilian language had become increasingly decentralised and informal in its orthography. Furthermore, its orthography has taken more elements from Italian orthography, even in places where it is not well suited.

During the period of the Norman Kingdom of Sicily, the Sicilian Latin of the time developed specific elements which reflected local innovations in speech and orthography. Frederick II and his Sicilian School used written Sicilian extensively, which is some of the earliest literature and poetry to be produced in an Italo-Romance language. These forms created the basis of the orthographies which evolved substantially over the following thousand years.

After the 15th century, Sicilian lost its status as an administrative language. This decline saw written Sicilian beginning to become limited to the genres of folklore, theatre, and poetry. Most examples of orthography we have from these times are in the personal style of various authors, such as Giovanni Meli, who created substantial works in Sicilian. His Poesi siciliani in five volumes was published in 1787, and an edition in six volumes was published in 1814.

In the late 18th century, publishers began compiling Sicilian language vocabularies. Among others, the Vocabolario siciliano etimologico, italiano e latino (1785, 1795) by Francesco Pasqualino and Michele Pasqualino was particularly influential, especially the 1839 edition with Rosario Rocca's edits and additions.

Inspired by this work, Vincenzo Mortillaro wrote a whole new dictionary intended to capture the language universally spoken across Sicily in a common orthography. He published three editions (1847, 1853 and 1876). And in his dictionary, he also included vocabulary of the sciences, arts and trades.

Later in the century, Antonino Traina (1868) and Vincenzo Nicotra (1883) continued Mortillaro's efforts to develop a common vocabulary and orthography. And in 1875, Giuseppe Pitrè published Grammatica Siciliana, which presents a common grammar, while also providing detailed notes on how the sounds of the Sicilian differ across dialects.

In the 20th century, researchers at the Centro di studi filologici e linguistici siciliani (CSFLS) developed an extensive descriptivist orthography which aims to represent every sound in the natural range of Sicilian accurately. This system has been published in several papers and is also used extensively in the Vocabolario siciliano, by Gaetano Cipolla in his Learn Sicilian series of textbooks and by Arba Sicula in its journal. And because Project Napizia assembled parallel text from Arba Sicula, this is also the system that its machine translator employs.

In 2016 the non-profit Cademia Siciliana began to build on the work of the CSFLS and other researchers to develop a unified orthography which considers etymological, contemporary usage and usability factors. A subsequent edition of the orthography was published under a new name Documento per l’Ortografia del Siciliano or "DOS" in 2024.

== Alphabet ==
There exist several traditional as well as contemporary alphabet proposals. The Sicilian alphabet approximately consists of the following:

Base and extended alphabet
Letter	Name	IPA	Diacritics	Notes
A, a	a [ˈa]	/a/	à, â (Note: Sicilian has three native diacritics. The grave accent is commonly used to express stress (à, è, ì, ò, ù), especially on oxytone and proparoxitone words, with the acute as a possible alternative on the two close vowels (í and ú). Furthermore the circumflex (â, ê, î, ô, û) is used to mark long vowels resulted from the reduction doubled vowels into a single character, or from a contraction (e.g. a lu → a ’u → ô). A diaeresis on the ë may indicate the local pronunciation [ə].)	
B, b	bi [ˈbi]	/b/		Always geminated after a vowel and usually spelled so within a word.
C, c	ci [ˈtʃi]	/k/ (as -ch- before e and i, -chi- before other vowels) [c], (as -c- before e and i) [ʃ], (after a nasal or r before e and i) [t͡ʃ], (geminated before e and i) [tːʃ], (as -ci-) [ʃʲ]/[ɕ], (as -ci- after a nasal) [tʃʲ] [t͡ɕ], (dialectal) [ç]	ç (Note: The CSFLS has created a detailed descriptivist alphabet for their Vocabolario siciliano which allows for all of the variation within Sicilian to be carefully represented and documented. It includes the following: -ə- for [ə]; -ç(i)- for /ç/; -(c)chj- for [c(ː)]; -ḍḍ- for /ɖː/; -(ḍ)ḍṛ- for [ɖ(ː)ɽ]; -(g)ghj- for [ɟ(ː)]; -ġ- for /ɡ/; -h- for [ħ]; -(h)hi- for [x̟(ː)]; -ḥ- for [x]; -ï- for vowel-preceding [ɪ]; -ṅ- for [ŋ]; -š- for /ʃ/; -ṣṭṛ- for [ʂː(ɽ)]; -(ṭ)ṭṛ- for [ʈ(ː)ɽ]; -ż- for [dz])	/ç/ has also been variously transcribed as -hi-, -x(i)-, -xh(j)-, -χ- and erroneously -sci-. In older texts, /k/ was spelled as -k(i)-, /tʃ/ as -ch-. See also under Q and S.
D, d	di [ˈdːi]	/d/, (single after vowel) [ɾ] (before r) [ɖ]	ḍ	See also under R.
Ḍḍ, ḍḍ (common usage) Dd, dd (traditional notation) Đđ, đđ	ḍḍi [ˈɖːi]	/ɖː/		While the traditional notation has fallen into disuse, it has been replaced by -dd- in most standards; however, since the latter may also represent gemination the dental variant /dː/, -ḍḍ- and -ddh- have been proposed by some to avoid confusion.
E, e	e [ˈɛ]	/ɛ/, (dialectal) [jɛ], [jæ]	è, ê, (dialectal) ë	
F, f	effe [ˈɛffɛ]	/f/		
G, g	gi [ˈdʒi]	/ɡ/, (single after vowel, dialectal) [ɣ] (as -gh- before e and i, -ghi- before other vowels) [ɟ], (single after vowel, dialectal) [j] (as -g- before e and i, -gi- before other vowels) /dʒ/ (as gn) /ɲ/	ġ	Always geminated after a vowel when representing /dʒ/ and usually spelled so within a word.
H, h	acca [ˈakka]	∅ /ç/	ḥ	Currently chiefly a silent etymological or orthographical letter. See under C, Ḍḍ and G.
I, i	i [ˈi]	/i/, (unstressed) [ɪ] (unstressed before a vowel) /j/	ì, í, î, ï	/j/ is usually represented by -i- after a consonant and -j- after a vowels or at the beginning of a word, but the two are generally interchangeable. See also under C and G.
J, j	i longa [ˌi lˈlɔŋga]	/j/, (geminated or after nasal) [ɟ]		/j/ is usually represented by -i- after a consonant and -j- after a vowels or at the beginning of a word, but the two are generally interchangeable. See also under C and G.
K, k	kappa [ˈkappa]	/k/ (as -k- before e and i, -ki- before other vowels)		See under C.
L, l	elle [ˈɛllɛ]	/l/		
M, m	emme [ˈɛmmɛ]	/m/		
N, n	enne [ˈɛnnɛ]	/n/	ṅ	Always assimilates to the point of articulation of the following consonant. See also under G.
O, o	o [ˈɔ]	/ɔ/, (dialectal) [wɔ], [wɐ]	ò, ô	
P, p	pi [ˈpi]	/p/		
Q, q	cu [ˈku]	/k/		Always followed by /w/. Spelled -cq- if geminated.
R, r	erre [ˈɛrrɛ]	/ɾ/, (after d and t) [ɽ], (geminated) /r/, [ɹ̝ː] or [ʐː]	ṛ	At the beginning of a word it is always geminated, unless it erroneously transcribes the soft pronunciation of d. See also under S.
S, s	esse [ˈɛssɛ]	/s/, (before a voiced or nasal consonant) /z/ (as -sc- before e and i, -sci- before other vowels) [ʃː], [ʃʲː]/[ɕː] (as -str-) [ʂː(ɽ)]	š, ṣ	/ʃ/ as also been variously transcribed as -x(i)-. See also under C and X.
T, t	ti [ˈti]	/t/ (before r) [ʈ]	ṭ	See also under S.
U, u	u [ˈu]	/u/, (unstressed) [ʊ] (unstressed before a vowel) /w/	ù, ú, û	
V, v	vi [ˈvi], vu [ˈvu]	/v/		
W, w	doppia vi [ˈdɔpːja ˈvi], doppia vu [ˈdɔpːja ˈvu]	/w/		Only used in loanwords.
X, x	ics [ˈiccɪs(ɪ)]	(older texts) /ʃ/ (loanwords) [cːɪs]		Now mainly used in loanwords. See under C and S.
X, χ		/ç/		See under C.
Y, y	ipsilon [ˈippɪsɪlɔn]	/i/ or /j/		Only used in loanwords.
Z, z	zeta [ˈtsɛːta]	/ts/	ż	Always geminated after a vowel and therefore usually spelled so within a word.

== See also ==
- Vocabolario siciliano
- Sicilian vowel system
- Arba Sicula
- Cadèmia Siciliana
