= Giardini panteschi =

Enclosed gardens on Sicilian island

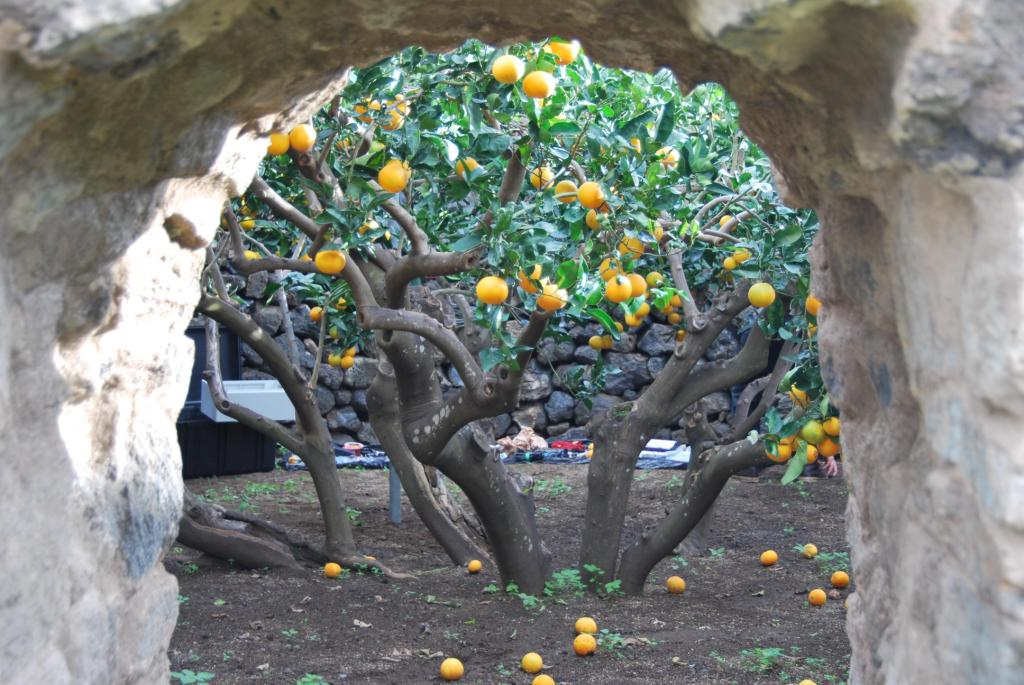
View through the entrance to a giardino pantescho

Giardini panteschi (Italian: "Pantelleria gardens"; also known locally as jardínu in Sicilian) are traditional dry-stone enclosures on the island of Pantelleria (Sicily), typically built around a single citrus tree to protect it from persistent winds and to create a favorable microclimate in otherwise arid, exposed conditions. They have also been popularly described as "Arab gardens", although detailed surveys note that the origin attribution is not securely documented.

== History ==
Surviving giardini panteschi are described as post-15th-century constructions, with major diffusion and rebuilding occurring in the 19th century as agricultural land use intensified and rural infrastructure expanded on Pantelleria. A Legambiente survey report cites historical counts of hundreds of gardens on the island (e.g., 322 in the early 1800s and 421 after Italian unification), while a horticultural study notes that hundreds remain in use in the modern period.

== Structure ==
Structurally, they consist of dry-stone lava stone enclosures, almost always circular in shape. Their height can vary from one to over three meters, depending on the size of the plants grown within them (almost always citrus fruits). The structure, without a roof, has a single narrow opening for access and small secondary openings at the base to allow rainwater to pass through. The top surface of the wall is also sloped inward to capture as much water as possible. While the walls prevent wind damage to the fruit, they also retain nighttime humidity, creating a microclimate within the garden that is much cooler and more humid than the surrounding environment.

Construction may use a double-facing wall with smaller stones packed as infill (kasciáta).

== The Donnafugata Garden ==
On 12 September 2008, the Fondo Ambiente Italiano (Italian Environment Fund) received a donation of a Pantellerian garden from the Sicilian winery Donnafugata. Circular in plan, with an external diameter of 11 meters and wall height at 4 meters, the garden is located in a natural amphitheater made up of terraced vineyards, with centuries-old Zibibbo trees, in the Khamma district. Inside is a centuries-old "Portogallo" sweet orange tree, an ancient variety rich in seeds but also in sugary juice, which, growing on multiple trunks, occupies the entire available area.

== See also ==
- Dammuso
- Vite ad alberello di Pantelleria
- Dry stone
- Terrace (earthworks)
