= Sicilian vowel system =

Characteristic of the dialects of Sicily

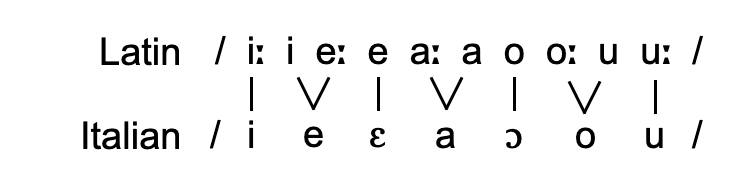
Italo-Western vowel changes from Latin.

The Sicilian vowel system is characteristic of the dialects of Sicily, Southern Calabria, Cilento and Salento. It may alternatively be referred to as the Sicilian vocalic scheme or the Calabro-Sicilian vowel system.

The Sicilian vowel system differs greatly from the evolution of the Classical Latin vowel system into the Vulgar Latin vowel system found in the greater part of the Romance area. In this system, there was a lowering (laxing) of short /i/, /e/, /o/, and /u/ into a seven-vowel system, while in the development of the Sicilian vowel system from that of Classical Latin, long /eː/ was raised to [i] and fused with both quantities of /i/; short /e/ was lowered to [ɛ] with an analogous development with the round vowels; i.e. long /oː/ was raised to [u] and fused with both quantities of [u]; short /o/ was lowered to [ɔ]. This resulted in a five-vowel system.

== Historical phonology ==
The exact historical development of the Sicilian vowel system is unknown. In southern dialects with the Sicilian vowel system, the general raising of /eː/ and /oː/ to [i] and [u] means that it is impossible to tell whether metaphony originally affected the high-mid vowels. Gerhard Rohlfs holds the view that this system is not the result of internal change, but of a later romanization (neoromanizzazione) of Sicily after the breakdown of Byzantine domination. Fanciullo (1984), however, claims that there was an uninterrupted continuation of Romance dialects during Byzantine domination. He explains the Sicilian vowel system through bilingualism, where Romance /eː/, /oː/ was identified with Byzantine /i/, /u/; variation between the two vowel systems seems to have persisted until the post-Norman era.

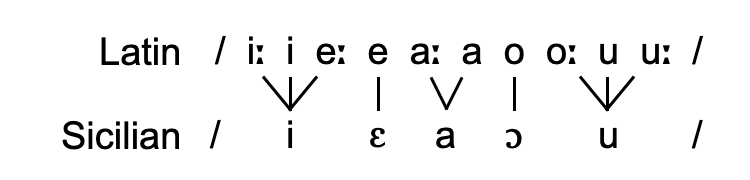
Sicilian vowel changes from Latin.

The ambivalent nature of Sicilian vowel development has resulted in various attempts to determine whether the vowels developed as in Italo-Western languages or as in Sardinian, with the subsequent merger to [i] and [u]. Calvano argued that Sicilian is an Italo-Western language, given the observation that Sicilian vocalism, but not Sardinian vocalism, is predictable from that of Italo-Western. Lausberg posited that Sicilian vocalism arose as a variation of the Italo-Western development by merging lax, high vowels with tense, mid vowels to lax, high vowels, followed by the merger which is peculiar to Sicilian. Bertoni, whose work was taken up again in Schiaffini (1957), argued that Sicilian had an intermediate Sardinian development on the basis of thirteenth-century texts. Hall grouped Sicilian along with Sardinian: "The earliest group [Southern Romance] to split off [from Proto-Romance] through not sharing in the merger of ĭ and ē, involved Sardinian, Lucanian and Sicilian... Proto-Italo-Western was then defined as the "intermediate stage that was the parent of the Romance languages not included in the Southern or Eastern groups."

An obvious quality of the Sicilian vowel system is the restriction of vowels other than the aforementioned five (a, e, i, o, u). This results in the unstressed vowel /o/ and /e/ of Latin becoming an unstressed [ʊ] and [ɪ] in Sicilian, respectively. This causes these vowels to have a far greater presence than the vowel /o/ and /e/ in Sicilian, while the opposite is true of other Romance languages such as Spanish and Italian (notwithstanding the conservative nature of Sicilian which retains the vowel [u] of the Latin stems -us and -um). In addition, one will never find a Sicilian word ending in the unaccented vowels /e/ or /o/, with the exception of monosyllabic conjunctions and certain recent loanwords: in fact, due to the influence of Italian in the media after World War II, as well as the recent influx of English terminology related to technology and globalization, there is an increasing number of words entering the Sicilian lexicon that do not adhere to the Sicilian vowel system. However, Sicilian is a vigorous language and historically, has always Sicilianized foreign loanwords over time.

== See also ==
- Sicily
- Sicilian School
- Sicilian language
- Gallo-Italic of Sicily
- Siculo-Arabic
- Sicilian orthography
