= Palatal approximant (disambiguation) =

A palatal approximant is a speech sound, but the term is ambiguous and can refer to the following:

- Voiceless palatal approximant [j̊]
- Voiced palatal approximant [j]
