= Gaetano Cipolla =

Sicilian-American academic

Gaetano Cipolla is a retired professor of Italian and Chairman of the Department of Modern Foreign Languages at St. John's University in New York City. He was born and raised in Francavilla di Sicilia in Messina Province, Sicily and emigrated to the US in 1955. He received his Bachelor of Science (1961) from New York University, Master of Arts (1969) from Hunter College (CUNY), and the PhD (1974) from New York University. He joined the faculty of St. John's University in 1974 and retired in 2011.

Cipolla has written numerous scholarly articles on Dante, Petrarch, Tasso, Pirandello, Calvino and others. Some of his essays appear in Labyrinth: Studies on an Archetype. He is also the author of a number of very successful booklets such as What Italy Has Given to the World and What Makes a Sicilian? He is President of Arba Sicula, an international organization that promotes the language and culture of Sicily and he is the editor of the journal Arba Sicula (Sicilian Dawn) and the newsletter Sicilia Parra (Sicily Speaks).

He is the general editor of three series of books for Legas Publishing: Pueti d'Arba Sicula/Poets of Arba Sicula, which has published five volumes; Sicilian Studies, with six volumes; and Italian Poetry in Translation with seven volumes.

Prof. Cipolla has translated several authors from the Sicilian language: Giovanni Meli's The Origins of the World, Don Chisciotti and Sanciu Panza, and Moral Fables and Other Poems; Vincenzo Ancona's Malidittu la lingua /Damned Language; The Poetry of Nino Martoglio; and Antonino Provenzano's Vinissi/I'd Love to Come. He has also translated Giuseppe Fava's play Violenza (2001), and History of Autonomous Sicily (Legas 2001) by Romolo Menighetti and Franco Nicastro.

Cipolla is the U. S. representative of Legas Publishing, a multilingual publishing company, and is based in Mineola, New York.

== See also ==
- Sicilian language
