= Monument to Giovanni Meli, Palermo =

Monumento a Giovanni Meli
- 38°07′23″N 13°20′49″E
- Location: Piazza Stazione Lolli, Palermo
- Material: Marble and bronze
- Dedicated to: Giovanni Meli

The Monument to Giovanni Meli is a bronze monumental sculpture, dedicated to the Sicilian poet, erected in 1909 on Piazza Stazione Lolli, near Via Dante, in central Palermo, Sicily.

== History ==
The bronze statue of the poet Giovanni Meli (who lived 1740–1815) was sculpted by Pasquale Civiletti and rises on a marble plinth. The poet holds a book in his left hand, and partly steps forward, though his gaze is melancholically downcast. A second statue to the poet, this time sitting, is found in the Palazzo Pretorio, Palermo. The poet is buried in the church of San Domenico, Palermo.
