= Dammuso =

Traditional stone house in Sicily

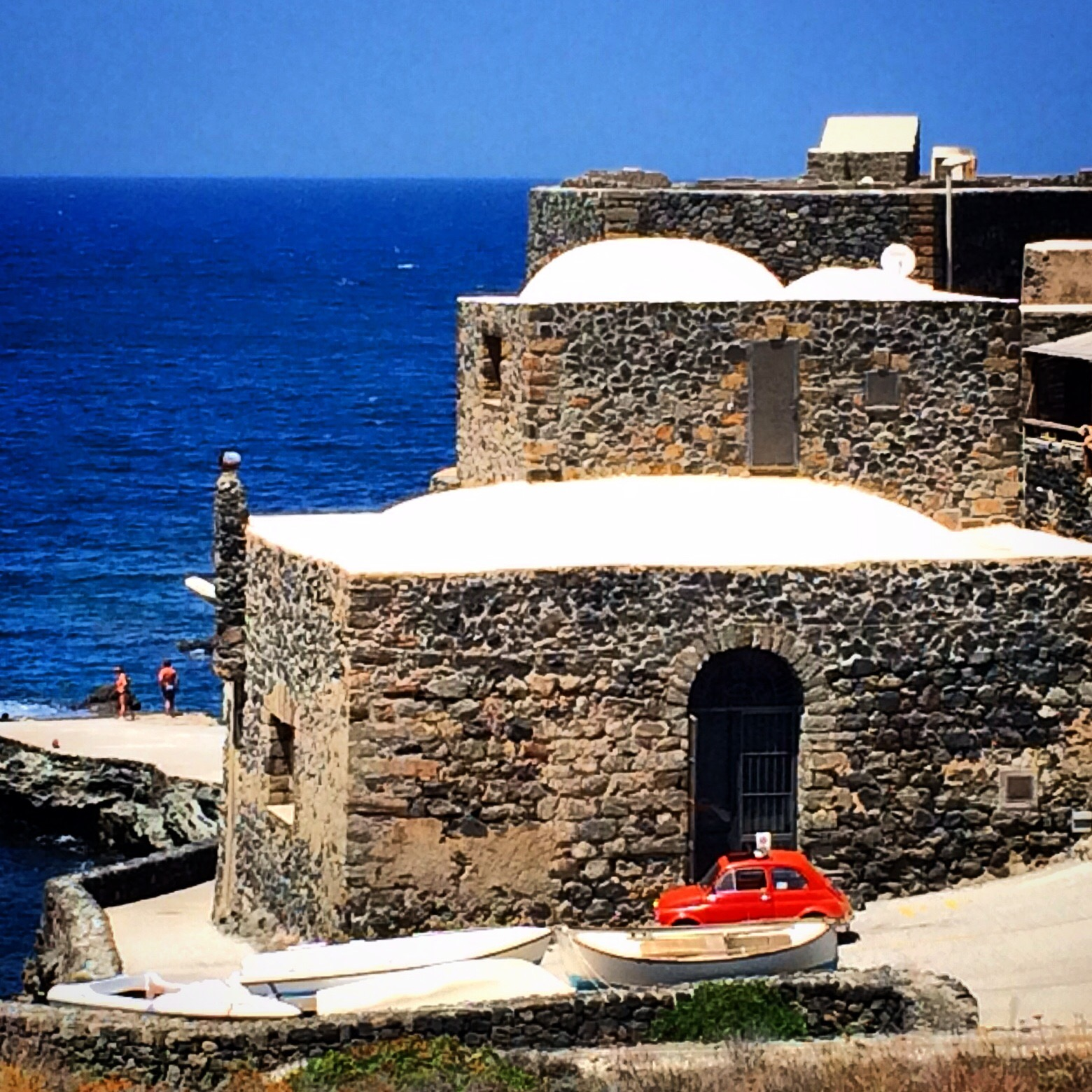
Dammusi on Pantelleria

A dammuso (pl. dammusi) is a type of traditional Sicilian peasant house, found mainly on the island of Pantelleria and also on nearby Lampedusa. The name comes from the Pantesco dialect of Sicilian dammusu, meaning 'vault', which is derived from the Arabic دِمّوس (dammūs) and Latin domus. The architectural style is possibly Arabic in origin, and the oldest known dammusi date to around the 10th century, when the islands were part of the Zirid emirate of Ifriqiya. Built from local volcanic rock, the dammusi evolved from a simpler circular type of stone dwelling used on the island in antiquity.

Each dammuso, roughly cubic in shape, has four outer walls made from two layers of dry, mortarless volcanic stone with gravel packed between them. They typically have a single door and one window on each of the other three walls. The small windows let in little light and are primarily for ventilation. The square stone buildings are divided internally into separate rooms. Additional rooms were sometimes added by building an adjacent dammuso.

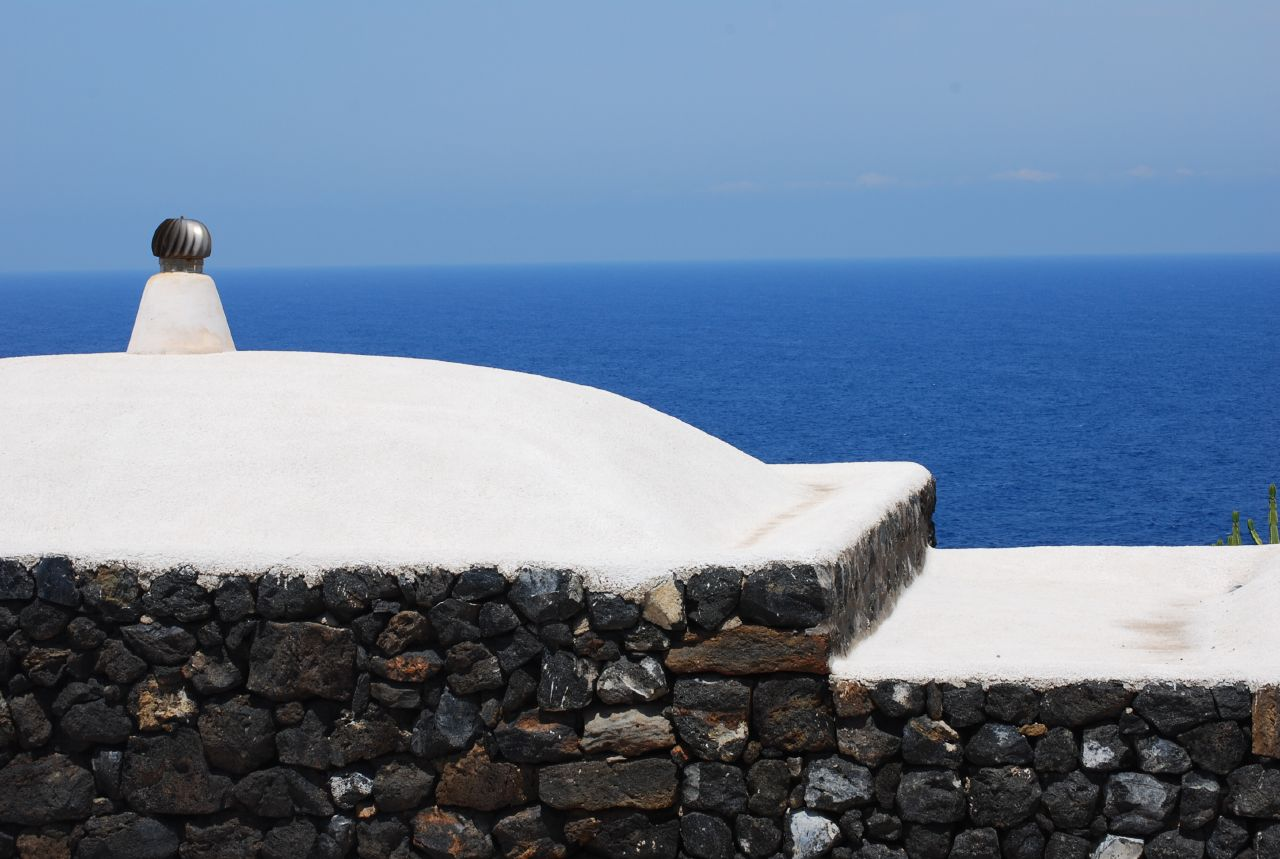
Channels around the domed roof gather and funnel rainwater down into underground cisterns.

Their domed roofs are built to gather rainwater. Each barrel-vaulted roof is covered with waterproof lime mortar and whitewashed. The roof is typically constructed using a wooden structure onto which load-bearing stones and water-resistant clay mortar are packed. The outer waterproof layer is composed of lime, lime-soaked tuff (a soft stone containing high amounts of volcanic ash), and lapilli (small volcanic stones). The roof is shaped to funnel water into an underground cistern for storage.

Dammuso construction methods passively protect against Pantelleria's intense heat, high winds, and limited freshwater. The homes offer natural temperature regulation in several ways. The thick walls insulate the house during the day, storing heat that is slowly released through the night, and the white roofs reflect sunlight. Measurements taken in the 1990s found that in August, dammusi maintained an internal temperature of around 26 °C (79 °F), about 8 °C (14 °F) cooler than the ambient air temperature on Pantelleria. In addition to the dammuso's walls, which can be up to 2 metres (6.6 ft) thick, additional protection from the wind is offered by dry stone walls constructed around the giardini panteschi surrounding some dammusi. Because Pantelleria has almost no surface freshwater—no rivers, springs, or lakes—the underground cisterns were necessary to maintain access to drinking water in pre-industrial times. Archaeologists have found hundreds of cisterns buried on the island.

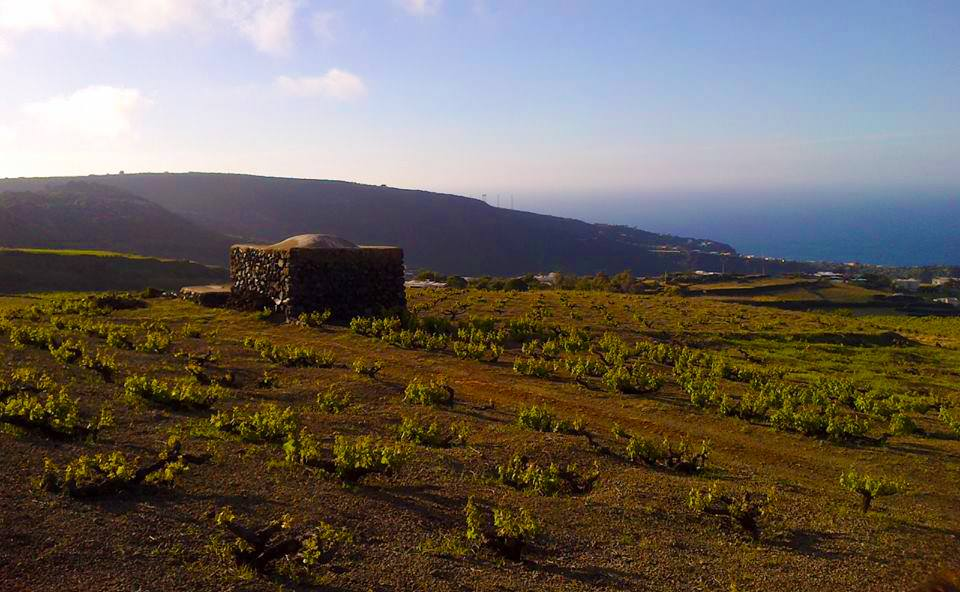
Rural dammuso in a Pantescan vineyard

Traditionally used by rural households, the dammusi now appear across Pantelleria in a range of contexts, including rural and urban settings. The earliest dammusi were likely constructed as temporary shelters for vineyard workers and gradually evolved into permanent homes. They are still used by winemakers on the island as well as by residents, and some still have a stinniture, or flat surface for drying grapes on the south side of the building. Rural dammusi are more likely to be a single, square structure, while those in neighborhoods are often more complex with multiple adjoining structures, each capped by its own dome. Many dammusi have been renovated for use by tourists visiting the island. Celebrities, including Madonna and fashion designer Giorgio Armani, have purchased dammusi to use as vacation homes.
