= Cademia Siciliana =

Transnational non-profit organization

Cademia Siciliana, Inc.
- Founded: 2016; 10 years ago
- Founders: Rausch, Paul J.; Baiamonte, Salvatore M.
- Tax ID no.: 81-4657931
- Purpose: Sicilian language Language planning Regional and minority languages of Sicily and Southern Calabria
- President: Nick Panzarella
- Affiliations: Associazione Cademia Siciliana
- Website: https://www.cademiasiciliana.org/

Cademia Siciliana
- Associazione Cademia Siciliana
- Founded: May 25, 2018; 8 years ago
- Founders: Rausch, Paul J.; Paleino, David; Amenta, Eva E.
- Founded at: Trapani
- Type: Non-profit organization
- Tax ID no.: CF 93080070811
- Legal status: association
- Purpose: linguistic
- Location: Trapani
- Official languages: Italian, English, Sicilian
- Main organ: Cunzigghiu
- Affiliations: Cademia Siciliana, Inc.
- Website: cademiasiciliana.org

Cademia Siciliana (pronounced [kaˈɾɛːmja sɪʃɪˈljaːna, -ˈdɛː-]; Sicilian Academy) is a transnational non-profit organization founded in 2016 by a group of Sicilian language academics, activists, researchers, and students to promote the Sicilian language through education, research, and activism. The organization has published an orthographical proposal for the Sicilian language, and maintains several Sicilian language research and technology projects, including advocacy projects, and translations for several popular applications and platforms such as Firefox, Telegram, Facebook and Android Keyboard. In 2021, the organization gained attention for its collaboration with Google's Woolaroo, an augmented reality project intended to support endangered languages.

== History ==
Cademia Siciliana was established by a group of linguists, educators, and students in response to the rapid decline in intergenerational transmission of the Sicilian language. Frustrated by institutional neglect and the lack of official recognition, the founders envisioned an organization capable of developing practical, modern tools to help speakers of Sicilian use the language in education, technology, and public life, as well as working with legislators to propose reform to Italian and Sicilian law pertaining to the Sicilian language.

Since its inception, the organization has grown from a grassroots initiative into an active participant in Sicilian language planning, engaging members and collaborators across Italy and abroad.

== Mission and Activities ==
The mission of Cademia Siciliana is to ensure that Sicilian remains a living language, capable of adapting to contemporary society. It operates in the following areas:

=== Language Planning and Didactic Materials ===
The organization partners with schools, educators, and community groups to provide workshops, curricula, and teaching materials. These efforts aim to familiarize young speakers with written Sicilian and to promote its use as a medium of instruction rather than a subject alone.

Cademia has developed and published orthographic guidelines, dictionaries, and writing tools aimed at encouraging consistent usage of written Sicilian. These materials are created with flexibility in mind, allowing for dialectal variation while providing a coherent framework for education and technology integration.

Cademia Siciliana has developed pilot programs in bilingual education and trains educators in modern methods of heritage language teaching. The organisation began providing workshops and materials for schools. These programmes aim to increase awareness regarding glottophobia, sociolinguistics, and to promote literacy in Sicilian.

For two years, the organization published an edition in Sicilian of the UNESCO Courier, along with a podcast audio companion to help promote literacy in the language.

=== Technology and Accessibility ===
Cademia Siciliana has collaborated with major tech platforms to integrate the Sicilian language into everyday digital tools. Projects include:

- Collaboration with Google to bring Sicilian to Google Translate
- Translation contributions to Mozilla Firefox
- Localization of Telegram
- Integration of Sicilian in Facebook and Meta assets
- Development of online dictionaries, spellcheckers, and input tools.

These initiatives aim to ensure that speakers can use Sicilian across digital environments.

In 2024, the organization collaborated with the Google Translate team to help make the tool available in Sicilian. In anticipation of the collaboration, a second version of the peer-reviewed Sicilian orthography was published under the new name "Documento per l’Ortografia del Siciliano".

=== Advocacy and Public Engagement ===
The organization engages in public advocacy to promote the legal recognition and protection of Sicilian as a regional language under Italian and European frameworks. Cademia Siciliana has contributed to legislative proposals aimed at amending Law 482/1999, which governs the protection of linguistic minorities in Italy. It has also lobbied for the ratification of the European Charter for Regional or Minority Languages along with other Italian linguistic advocacy groups.

It also collaborates with cultural institutions, museums, and local governments to support projects that elevate the visibility and status of Sicilian in public life.

In celebration of the second “Simana dû sicilianu”, in collaboration with the Palermo organisation “Trinacria”, the association launched a Sicily-wide campaign for the recognition of the Sicilian language. The ongoing project has resulted in many Sicilian towns officially passing motions to support their “Manifesto for the Sicilian language". The project known as "Project Jusu-Susu" (below-above) resulted in several legal proposals for recognition of the Sicilian language. Due to these proposals, the organization faced backlash from the Centro di studi filologici e linguistici siciliani, resulting in a public debate over the future of Sicilian language planning.

== Recognition and Impact ==
Cademia's work has been cited by academic institutions and featured in international media as a model for community-driven language revitalization. Its digital outreach and modern sociolinguistic approach have positioned it as a forward-thinking force in the Mediterranean's linguistic landscape.

== Publications ==
=== Books ===
- Rausch, Paul; Baiamonte, Salvatore (2017). Proposta di Normalizzazione Ortografica Comune della lingua siciliana per le varietà parlate nell'isola di Sicilia, arcipelaghi ed isole satelliti, e nell'area di Reggio Calabria (PDF) (in Italian) (1 ed.). Independently Published. ISBN 9781720007456.
- Rausch, Paul J.; Baiamonte, Salvatore M. (2019). Li me primi 101 palori 'n sicilianu (in Sicilian, Italian, and English). Illustrated by Amy Whicker (1 ed.). Cademia Siciliana Incorporated. ISBN 9780578446479.
- Baiamonte, Salvatore. "Documento per l'Ortografia del Siciliano 2024". Cademia Siciliana (in Italian).
- Paleino, David; Amenta, Eva E. (2024). I cunti di Giufà - di culurari! (in Sicilian). Cademia Siciliana. ISBN 9798878169165.
- Paleino, David (2024). I culura (in Sicilian). Illustrated by Ajanta Guhathakurta. Cademia Siciliana. ISBN 9788894796704.
- Paleino, David; Di Maggio, Martin (2024). Kughurët (in Arbëresh). Cademia Siciliana. ISBN 9788894796711.
- Tomasello, Ylenia (2024). Fàvuli murali - vul. 1 (in Sicilian). Cademia Siciliana. ISBN 9788894796728.

=== Periodicals ===
- "Lu Curreri di l'UNESCO". Lu Curreri di l'UNESCO (in Sicilian). eISSN 2640-0618. ISSN 2640-0596.

=== Other works ===
- Grazzi, translation into Sicilian of Sigmond, Júlia (2018). Dankon (in Esperanto). Cluj Napoca: Exit. p. 68. ISBN 9789737803856.

== See also ==
- Sicily
- Sicilian language
- Gallo-Italic of Sicily
- Siculo-Arabic
- Center for Sicilian Philological and Linguistic Studies
