= Arba Sicula =

Arba Sicula (Sicilian: Sicilian Dawn) is a not-for-profit international society whose main objective is the preservation and promotion of the Sicilian language and culture. Its administration is located in Mineola, New York. The majority of members are from the United States, although there are also members from Sicily, Canada and other countries where Sicilian immigrants are found in large numbers. The society was founded in 1978.

Arba Sicula publishes two issues per year of its bilingual journal of the same name (although in recent years they have been combined into a single annual edition), and the twice-yearly magazine Sicilia Parra (Sicilian for Sicily Talks). Both publications are among the few printed periodicals available in Sicilian. Both publications contain poetry, essays and news items about Sicily and the Siculo-American community. Arba Sicula also has a publishing arm, Legas, which publishes many books on matters relating to Sicily and the Sicilian language (often bilingual, in English and Sicilian).

Gaetano Cipolla has been the president of Arba Sicula (and editor of the journal and magazine) for the last 18 years. He was also a professor of languages at St. John's University, New York for many years, having recently retired. He has written books on Sicilian culture and language and has translated some of the most important Sicilian poetry into English, including the verses of the celebrated poets: Giovanni Meli and Nino Martoglio, along with the works of many modern poets and writers. Over the years, numerous Sicilian dialect scholars have been part of the board: Alex Caldiero (co-founder), Nicolò d'Alessandro, Gaetano Basile, Franco Di Marco, Mario Gallo, Giuseppe Quatriglio, Marco Scalabrino, just to name a few.

While dedicated mainly to the Sicilian diaspora in North America, the organisation is also recognised among the various cultural and political institutions of Sicily itself.
