= Voiceless palatal fricative =

Consonantal sound represented by ⟨ç⟩ in IPA

ç
- IPA number: 138

Audio sample
- source · help

Encoding
- Entity (decimal): &#231;
- Unicode (hex): U+00E7
- X-SAMPA: C
- Braille: ⠖ (braille pattern dots-235) ⠉ (braille pattern dots-14)
Image

A voiceless palatal fricative is a type of consonantal sound used in some spoken languages. The symbol in the International Phonetic Alphabet that represents this sound is ⟨ç⟩. It is the non-sibilant equivalent of the voiceless alveolo-palatal fricative. Palatal fricatives are relatively rare phonemes, and only 5% of the world's languages have /ç/ as a phoneme. The sound further occurs as an allophone of /x/ (e.g. in German or Greek), or, in other languages, of /h/ in the vicinity of front vowels.

== Features ==
Voiceless palatal fricative (ç)

Features of a voiceless palatal fricative:

- Its manner of articulation is fricative, which means it is produced by constricting air flow through a narrow channel at the place of articulation, causing turbulence.
- Its place of articulation is palatal, which means it is articulated with the middle or back part of the tongue raised to the hard palate.
- Its phonation is voiceless, which means it is produced without vibrations of the vocal cords. In some languages the vocal cords are actively separated, so it is always voiceless; in others the cords are lax, so that it may take on the voicing of adjacent sounds.
- It is an oral consonant, which means that air is not allowed to escape through the nose.
- It is a median consonant, which means it is produced by directing the airstream down the midline of the tongue, rather than to the sides.
- Its airstream mechanism is pulmonic, which means it is articulated by pushing air only with the intercostal muscles and abdominal muscles, as in most speech sounds.

== Occurrence ==
=== Palatal ===
Language		Word	IPA	Meaning	Notes
Blackfoot		ᖱᑊᖽᒧᐧᖿ / ihkitsíkaa	[ɪçkit͡síkaː]	'seven'	Allophone of /x/.
Chinese	Taizhou dialect	嬉	[çi]	'to play'	Corresponds to alveolo-palatal /ɕ/ in other Wu dialects.
Chinese	Meixian dialect	香	[çʲɔŋ˦]	'fragrant'	Corresponds to palatalized fricative /hj/ in romanised as "hi-" or "hy-" Hakka dialect writing.
Danish	Standard	pjaske	[ˈpçæskə]	'splash'	May be alveolo-palatal [ɕ] instead. Before /j/, aspiration of /p, t, k/ is realized as devoicing and fortition of /j/. Note, however, that the sequence /tj/ is normally realized as an affricate [t͡ɕ]. See Danish phonology
Dutch	Standard Northern	wiegje	[ˈʋiçjə]	'crib'	Allophone of /x/ before /j/ for some speakers. See Dutch phonology
English	Australian	hue	[çʉː]	'hue'	Phonetic realization of the sequence /hj/. See Australian English phonology and English phonology
English	British	hue	[çʉː]	'hue'	Phonetic realization of the sequence /hj/. See Australian English phonology and English phonology
English	Scouse	like	[laɪ̯ç]	'like'	Allophone of /k/; ranges from palatal to uvular, depending on the preceding vowel. See English phonology
Estonian		vihm	[viçm]	'rain'	Allophone of /h/. See Estonian phonology
Finnish		vihko	[ʋiçko̞]	'notebook'	Allophone of /h/. See Finnish phonology
French	Parisian	merci	[mɛʁ̥ˈsi̥ç]	'thank you'	The close vowels /i, y, u/ and the mid front /e, ɛ/ at the end of utterances are often devoiced. See French phonology
German		nicht	[nɪçt]	'not'	Traditionally allophone of /x/, or vice versa, but phonemic for some speakers who have both /aːx/ and /aːç/ (< /aʁç/). See Standard German phonology § Ich-Laut and ach-Laut.
Haida		xíl	[çɪ́l]	'leaf'	
Hmong	White (Dawb)	𖬗𖬰𖬧𖬰 / xya	[ça˧]	'seven'	Corresponds to alveolo-palatal /ɕ/ in Dananshan dialect
Hmong	Green (Njua)	𖬗𖬰𖬧𖬰 / xya	[ça˧]	'seven'	Corresponds to alveolo-palatal /ɕ/ in Dananshan dialect
Hungarian		kapj	[ˈkɒpç]	'get' (imperative)	Allophone of /j/ between a voiceless obstruent and a word boundary. See Hungarian phonology
Icelandic		hérna	[ˈçɛ(ɾ)tnä]	'here'	Allophone of /h/ near /j/ and /i/. See Icelandic phonology
Irish		a Sheáin	[ə çaːnʲ]	'John' (voc.)	See Irish phonology
Japanese		日 / hi	[çi]	'day'	Allophone of /h/ before /i/ and /j/. See Japanese phonology
Kabyle		ḵtil	[çtil]	'to measure'	
Korean		힘 / him	[çim]	'strength'	Allophone of /h/ word-initially before /i/ and /j/. See Korean phonology
Minangkabau	Mukomuko	loyh	[lojç]	'loose'	Allophone of /h/ after /i/, /oj/, and /uj/ in coda.
Mochica	18th and 19th centuries	j̓ak	[çak]	'fish'	Shifted from [𝼆] in the 18th and 19th centuries.
Moksha		шалхка	[ʃalçka]	'nose'	
Muniche		[tʃaçu]		'plant stalk'	
Norwegian	Urban East	kjerne	[ˈçɐ̞̂ːʴɳə]	'core'	Often alveolo-palatal [ɕ] instead; younger speakers in Bergen, Stavanger and Oslo merge it with /ʂ/. See Norwegian phonology
Nuxalk		cp	[çpʰ]	'to squeeze water out of string'	Cognate with /ʃ/ in other Salishan languages.
Pashto	Ghilji dialect	پښه	[pça]	'foot'	See Pashto phonology
Pashto	Wardak dialect	پښه	[pça]	'foot'	See Pashto phonology
Romanian	Standard	Rohia	[r̥ʊ̞ˈçijä]	'Rohia'	Allophone of /h/ before /i/. Typically transcribed with [hʲ]. See Romanian phonology
Russian	Standard	твёрдый / tvjórdyj	[ˈt̪ʋʲɵrd̪ɨ̞ç]	'hard'	Possible emphatic realization of /j/. See Russian phonology
Scottish Gaelic		eich	[eç]	'horses'	Slender allophone of /x/. See Scottish Gaelic phonology and orthography
Sicilian		ciumi	[ˈçuːmɪ]	'river'	Evolved from the Latin /fl/ nexus. Realized as [t͡ʃ] when preceded by a consonant. See Sicilian phonology
Spanish	Chilean	mujer	[muˈçe̞ɾ]	'woman'	Allophone of /x/ before front vowels. See Spanish phonology
Turkish		zihin	[ziˈçin]	'intellect'	Allophone of /h/. See Turkish phonology
Uzbek		maktab	[mɑçtɑb]	'school'	Occurs when /k/ comes before /t/ and /b/ sounds.
Walloon		texhe	[tɛç]	'to knit'	⟨xh⟩ spelling proper in Common Walloon, in the Feller system it would be written ⟨hy⟩
Welsh		hiaith	[çaɪ̯θ]	'language'	Occurs in words where /h/ comes before /j/ due to h-prothesis of the original word, i.e. /jaɪ̯θ/ iaith 'language' becomes ei hiaith 'her language', resulting in /j/ i → /ç/ hi. See Welsh phonology

=== Post-palatal ===
Voiceless post-palatal or pre-velar fricative

ç̠

x̟

Audio sample
- source · help

There is also a voiceless post-palatal or pre-velar fricative in some languages, which is articulated slightly farther back compared with the place of articulation of the prototypical voiceless palatal fricative, though not as back as the prototypical voiceless velar fricative. The International Phonetic Alphabet does not have a separate symbol for that sound, though it can be transcribed as ⟨ç̠⟩, ⟨ç᫢⟩ (both symbols denote a retracted ⟨ç⟩) or ⟨x̟⟩ (advanced ⟨x⟩).

Language		Word	IPA	Meaning	Notes
Belarusian		глухі / hluchí	[ɣɫuˈx̟i]	'deaf'	Typically transcribed in IPA with ⟨xʲ⟩. See Belarusian phonology
Dutch	Standard Belgian	acht	[ˈax̟t]	'eight'	May be velar [x] instead. See Dutch phonology
Dutch	Southern accents	acht	[ˈax̟t]	'eight'	May be velar [x] instead. See Dutch phonology
Greek		ψυχή / psychí	[ps̠iˈç̠i]	'soul'	See Modern Greek phonology
Limburgish	Weert dialect	ich	[ɪ̞x̟]	'I'	Allophone of /x/ before and after front vowels. See Weert dialect phonology
Lithuanian		chemija	[ˈx̟ɛmija]	'chemistry'	Very rare; typically transcribed in IPA with ⟨xʲ⟩. See Lithuanian phonology
Russian	Standard	хи́нди / chíndi	[ˈx̟inʲdʲɪ]	'Hindi'	Typically transcribed in IPA with ⟨xʲ⟩. See Russian phonology
Spanish		mujer	[muˈx̟e̞ɾ]	'woman'	Allophone of /x/ before front vowels. See Spanish phonology
Ukrainian		алхімія / alchimija	[ɐl̞ʲˈx̟imʲijɐ]	'alchemy'	Typically transcribed in IPA with ⟨xʲ⟩. See Ukrainian phonology
Uzbek		xurmo	[x̟urmɒ]	'date palm'	Weakly fricated; occurs word-initially and pre-consonantally, otherwise it is post-velar [x̠].

=== Voiceless palatal approximant ===
Voiceless palatal approximant

ȷ̊

ç˕
- IPA number: 153 402A

Audio sample
- source · help

Encoding
- Entity (decimal): &#106;&#778;
- Unicode (hex): U+006A U+030A
- X-SAMPA: j_0

A voiceless palatal approximant is a type of consonantal sound used in some spoken languages. The symbol in the International Phonetic Alphabet that represents this sound is ⟨ j̊ ⟩, a j with a ring, indicating the voiceless homologue of the voiced palatal approximant. The IPA also had a dedicated symbol ⟨ꞕ⟩, an h with palatal hook, for the similar palatalized hʲ sound, but that is now obsolete. In Finno-Ugric transcription, this sound is transcribed with ⟨ᴊ⟩, a small capital j.

The palatal approximant can in many cases be considered the semivocalic equivalent of the voiceless variant of the close front unrounded vowel [i̥]. The sound is essentially an Australian English ⟨y⟩ (as in year) pronounced strictly without vibration of the vocal cords.

It is found as a phoneme in Jalapa Mazatec, Washo, and Kildin Sami.

Language		Word	IPA	Meaning	Notes
Breton	Bothoa dialect				Contrasts voiceless /j̊/, plain voiced /j/ and nasal voiced /ȷ̃/ approximants.
Chinese	Standard	票 / piào	[pj̊äʊ̯˥˩]	'ticket'	Common allophony of /j/ after aspirated consonants. Normally transcribed as [pʰj]. See Standard Chinese phonology
English	Australian	huge	[j̊ʉːdʒ]	'huge'	H-dropping, also allophone of /j/. See Australian English phonology
English	New Zealand	huge	[j̊i̠(ːʷ)dʒ]	'huge'	H-dropping, also allophone of /j/, also can be [ç] instead. See New Zealand English phonology
French		pierre	[pj̊ɛːʀ̥]	'stone'	Devoiced allophone of /j/. See French phonology
Icelandic		hérna	[ˈj̊ɛ(ɾ)tnä]	'here'	Dialectal, or in free variation with [ç]
Jalapa Mazatec					Contrasts voiceless /j̊/, plain voiced /j/ and glottalized voiced /j̰/ approximants.
Japanese		日 / hi	[j̊i]	'day'	Colloquial, Allophone of /j/
Scottish Gaelic		a-muigh	[əˈmuj̊]	'outside' (directional)	Allophone of /j/ and /ʝ/. See Scottish Gaelic phonology
Thai					Allophone of /j/.
Tibetan	Khams				Phonemic
Washo		t'á:Yaŋi	[ˈtʼaːj̊aŋi]	'he's hunting'	Contrasts voiceless /j̊/ and voiced /j/ approximants.
Koyukon (Denaakk'e)					Contrasts voiceless /j̊/ and voiced /j/ approximants.

== See also ==
- Index of phonetics articles

== Notes ==
Place →	Labial					Coronal										Dorsal					Laryngeal			
Manner ↓	Bilabial		Labiodental		Linguolabial		Dental		Alveolar		Postalveolar		Retroflex		(Alveolo-)palatal		Velar		Uvular		Pharyngeal/epiglottal		Glottal	
Nasal	m̥	m	ɱ̊	ɱ		n̼	n̪̊	n̪	n̥	n	n̠̊	n̠	ɳ̊	ɳ	ɲ̊	ɲ	ŋ̊	ŋ	ɴ̥	ɴ				
Plosive	p	b	p̪	b̪	t̼	d̼	t̪	d̪	t	d			ʈ	ɖ	c	ɟ	k	ɡ	q	ɢ	ʡ		ʔ	
Sibilant affricate							t̪s̪	d̪z̪	ts	dz	t̠ʃ	d̠ʒ	tʂ	dʐ	tɕ	dʑ								
Non-sibilant affricate	pɸ	bβ	p̪f	b̪v			t̪θ	d̪ð	tɹ̝̊	dɹ̝	t̠ɹ̠̊˔	d̠ɹ̠˔			cç	ɟʝ	kx	ɡɣ	qχ	ɢʁ	ʡʜ	ʡʢ	ʔh	
Sibilant fricative							s̪	z̪	s	z	ʃ	ʒ	ʂ	ʐ	ɕ	ʑ								
Non-sibilant fricative	ɸ	β	f	v	θ̼	ð̼	θ	ð	θ̠	ð̠	ɹ̠̊˔	ɹ̠˔	ɻ̊˔	ɻ˔	ç	ʝ	x	ɣ	χ	ʁ	ħ	ʕ	h	ɦ
Approximant		β̞		ʋ				ð̞		ɹ		ɹ̠		ɻ		j		ɰ						˷
Tap/flap		ⱱ̟		ⱱ					ɾ̥	ɾ			ɽ̊	ɽ						ɢ̆		ʡ̆		
Trill	ʙ̥	ʙ							r̥	r		r̠	ɽ̊r̥	ɽr					ʀ̥	ʀ	ʜ	ʢ		
Lateral affricate									tɬ	dɮ			tꞎ	d𝼅	c𝼆	ɟʎ̝	k𝼄	ɡʟ̝						
Lateral fricative							ɬ̪		ɬ	ɮ			ꞎ	𝼅	𝼆	ʎ̝	𝼄	ʟ̝						
Lateral approximant								l̪	l̥	l		l̠	ɭ̊	ɭ	ʎ̥	ʎ	ʟ̥	ʟ		ʟ̠				
Lateral tap/flap									ɺ̥	ɺ			𝼈̊	𝼈		ʎ̆		ʟ̆						

		BL	LD	D	A	PA	RF	P	V	U
Implosive	Voiced	ɓ			ɗ		ᶑ	ʄ	ɠ	ʛ
Implosive	Voiceless	ɓ̥			ɗ̥		ᶑ̊	ʄ̊	ɠ̊	ʛ̥
Ejective	Stop	pʼ			tʼ		ʈʼ	cʼ	kʼ	qʼ
Ejective	Affricate		p̪fʼ	tθʼ	tsʼ	tʃʼ	tʂʼ	tɕʼ	kxʼ	qχʼ
Ejective	Fricative	ɸʼ	fʼ	θʼ	sʼ	ʃʼ	ʂʼ	ɕʼ	xʼ	χʼ
Ejective	Lateral affricate				tɬʼ			c𝼆ʼ	k𝼄ʼ	q𝼄ʼ
Ejective	Lateral fricative				ɬʼ					
Click (top: velar; bottom: uvular)	Tenuis	kʘ qʘ		kǀ qǀ	kǃ qǃ		k𝼊 q𝼊	kǂ qǂ		
Click (top: velar; bottom: uvular)	Voiced	ɡʘ ɢʘ		ɡǀ ɢǀ	ɡǃ ɢǃ		ɡ𝼊 ɢ𝼊	ɡǂ ɢǂ		
Click (top: velar; bottom: uvular)	Nasal	ŋʘ ɴʘ		ŋǀ ɴǀ	ŋǃ ɴǃ		ŋ𝼊 ɴ𝼊	ŋǂ ɴǂ	ʞ	
Click (top: velar; bottom: uvular)	Tenuis lateral				kǁ qǁ					
Click (top: velar; bottom: uvular)	Voiced lateral				ɡǁ ɢǁ					
Click (top: velar; bottom: uvular)	Nasal lateral				ŋǁ ɴǁ					
