= Vocabolario siciliano =

Dictionary of the Sicilian language

The "Vocabolario siciliano" is a five-volume lexicographic work on the Sicilian language by Giorgio Piccitto, Salvatore Tropea, and Salvatore Carmelo Trovato. It was realised with assistance from the Sicilian Autonomous Region and the National Research Council (Italy).

The initial project for the creation of a Sicilian-Italian dictionary was by Professor Giorgio Piccitto, in 1950. The project was then realized thanks to the linguistic section Opera del Vocabolario Siciliano created specifically by the Center for Philological and Linguistic Studies of Sicily.

It was published between 1977 and 2002 and is considered the highest reference on the subject, with a total of about 5,500 pages. Giorgio Piccitto, the work’s originator, was born in Ragusa on 10 February 1916 and died in Catania on 30 March 1972, five years before the first volume was published. He was a professor of linguistics at the University of Catania and a founder of Catanese dialectology, as well as one of the founders of the Centro di Studi Filologici e Linguistici Siciliani. Following Piccitto’s death, the project was continued and directed by Giovanni Tropea, who oversaw volumes four and five, and was later completed by Salvatore Carmelo Trovato, who edited the final volume. The five volumes were published by the Centro di Studi Filologici e Linguistici Siciliani in Catania and contain approximately 80,000 entries. The dictionary uses the orthographic system developed by Piccitto himself, which has been adopted as a standard in subsequent Sicilian linguistic publications. It was also realized with the contribution of the Sicilian Region and the National Research Council. It is one of the most important works ever carried out on the Sicilian language.
