= Vite ad alberello =

Traditional agricultural practice of cultivating the vite ad alberello (head-trained bush vines) of the community of Pantelleria
- UNESCO Intangible Cultural Heritage
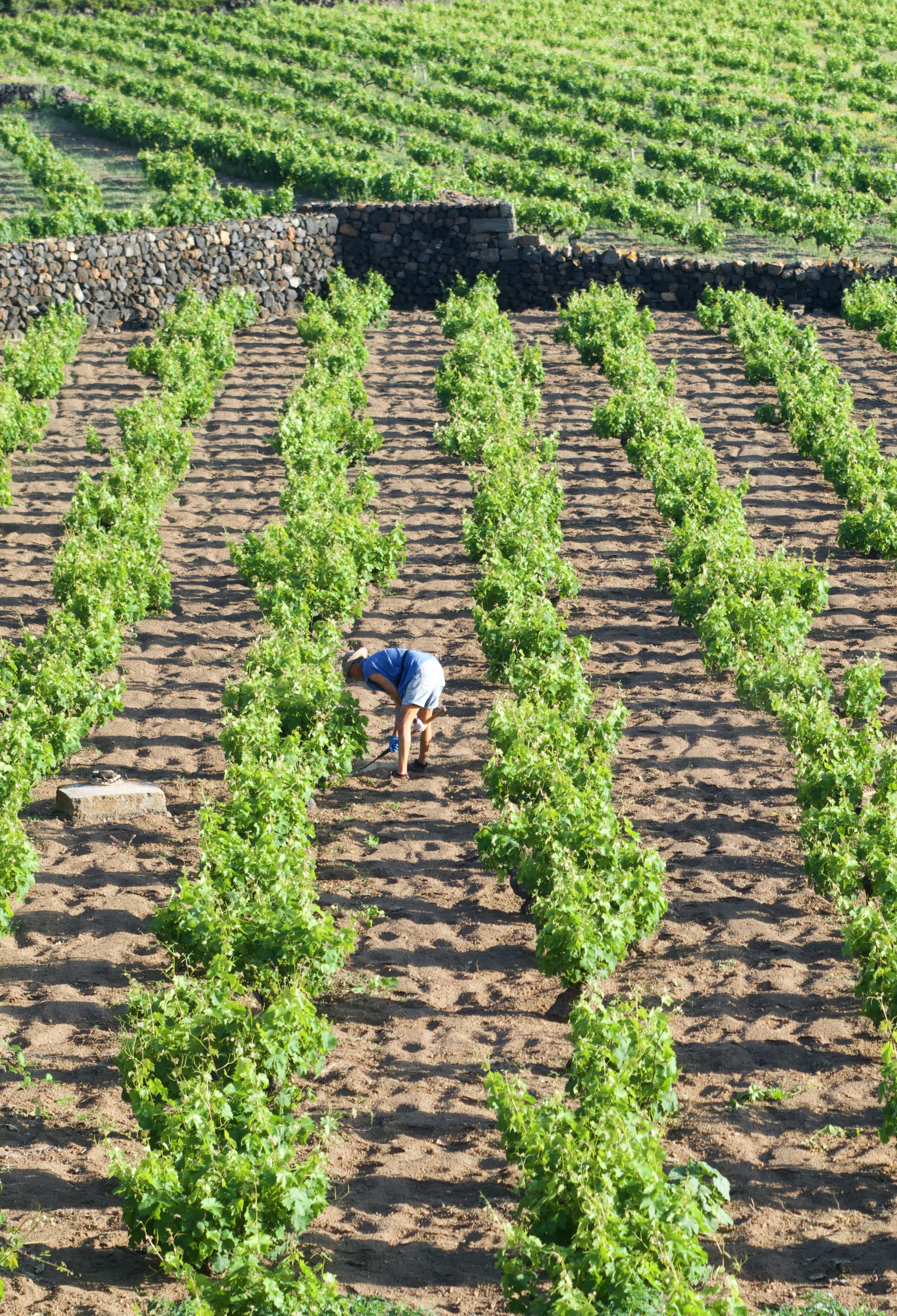
- Alberello-trained vines on Pantelleria (Sicily, Italy)
- Country: Italy
- Reference: 00720
- Region: Europe and North America

Inscription history
- Inscription: 2014 (9th session)
- List: Representative
- Inscribed on the Representative List of the Intangible Cultural Heritage of Humanity

Vite ad alberello di Pantelleria (literally “Pantelleria bush vines”) is a traditional vine-training and cultivation system practiced on the Mediterranean island of Pantelleria (Sicily, Italy). It is characterized by low, head-trained (bush) grapevines cultivated under harsh, windy, and arid conditions, and maintained largely through manual labor and locally transmitted knowledge. The practice was inscribed in 2014 on UNESCO's Representative List of the Intangible Cultural Heritage of Humanity.

== Setting and landscape ==
Pantelleria's viticultural landscape combines small plots, terracing, and extensive dry-stone walls built from volcanic rock, reflecting long-term human adaptation to steep slopes, thin soils, and strong winds. Local institutions and producers describe the island's "alberello pantesco" vineyards as a form of "heroic viticulture," shaped by aridity, persistent winds, and volcanic soils.

== Cultivation method ==
UNESCO describes the practice as a multi-step system transmitted across generations of vine growers and farmers, with approximately 5,000 island inhabitants owning and cultivating a plot of land using sustainable methods. The technique begins with ground preparation (including levelling) and the digging of a hollow in which the vine is planted. The main stem is pruned to produce six branches, forming a low bush with a radial arrangement; the hollow is repeatedly reshaped to maintain the plant in a favorable microclimate.

Park authorities describe the alberello-trained vine as cultivated in basins (often cited as ~20 cm deep) that help capture scarce rainwater and shield grape clusters from the wind; cultivation and harvesting are largely manual, with harvest beginning around the end of July in many years.

== Social and cultural practices ==
UNESCO emphasizes that the knowledge and skills associated with vite ad alberello are passed down within families through oral and practical instruction in the local dialect. Community rituals and festivals, especially between July and September, help sustain the practice as a shared social tradition and a marker of local identity.

== Grapes and wine ==
Producers and local institutions commonly associate alberello cultivation on Pantelleria with the Zibibbo grape (Muscat of Alexandria), which is used in Pantelleria's traditional wine production, including sweet styles such as Passito di Pantelleria.

== UNESCO inscription ==
The practice was inscribed in 2014 on the UNESCO Representative List of the Intangible Cultural Heritage of Humanity (element ID 00720). Italian government communications describe the decision as taken during the ninth session of the Intergovernmental Committee (24–28 November 2014) at UNESCO headquarters in Paris, highlighting the practice's cultural and social role for the island community in addition to its economic value. Local producers’ organizations have also described supporting the UNESCO candidacy for the alberello practice.

== Gallery ==
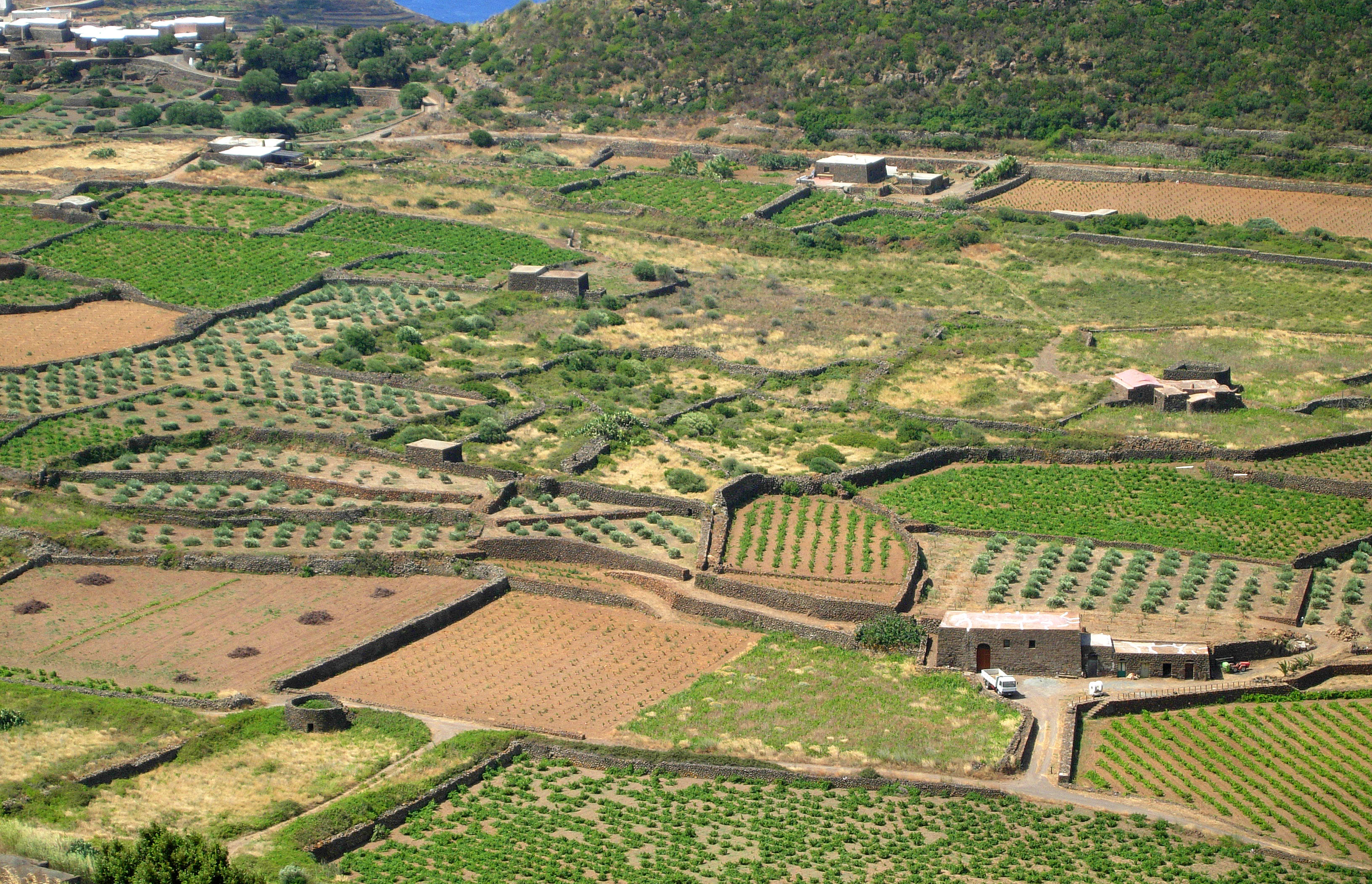
Vineyard landscape on Pantelleria

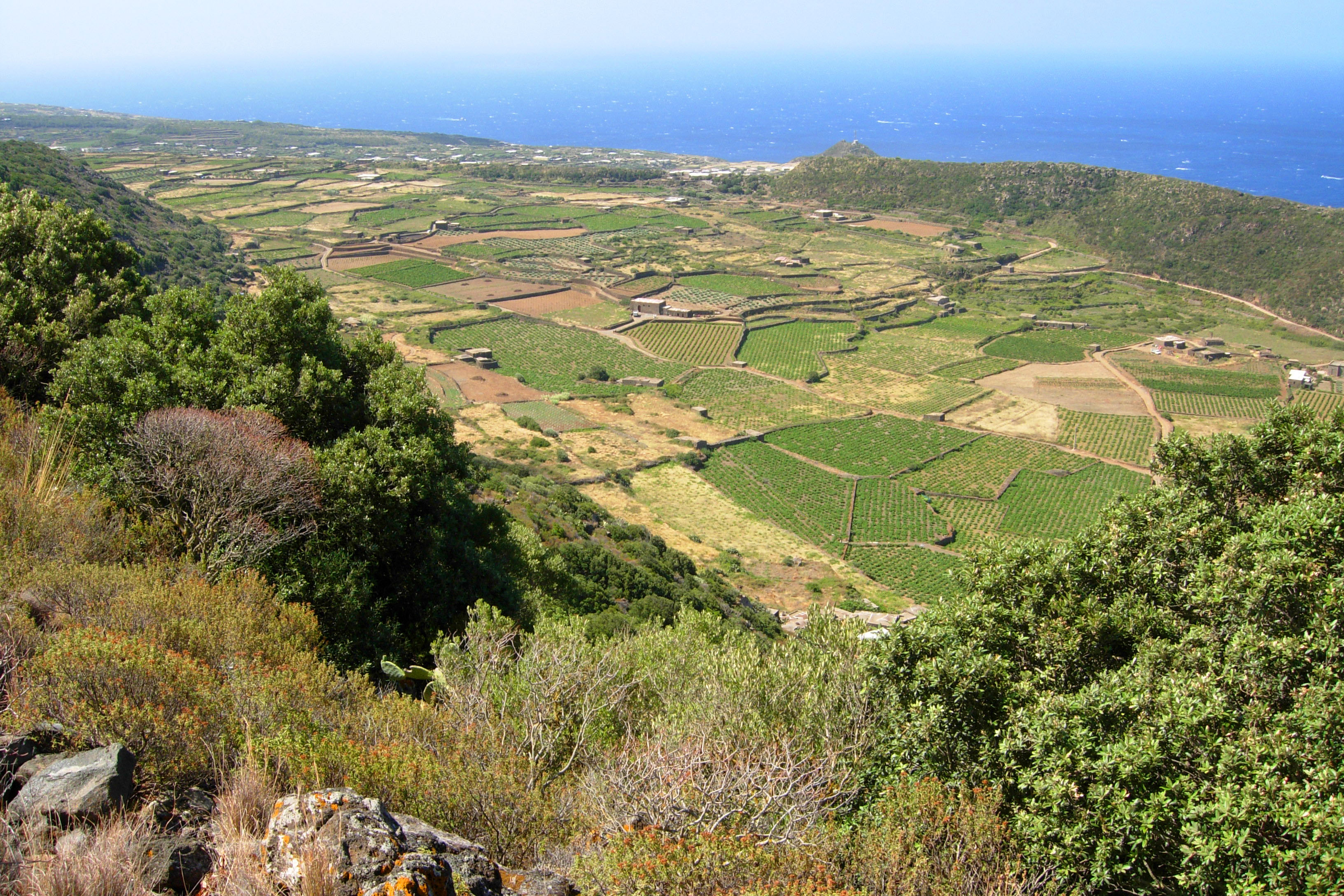
Terraced countryside on Pantelleria

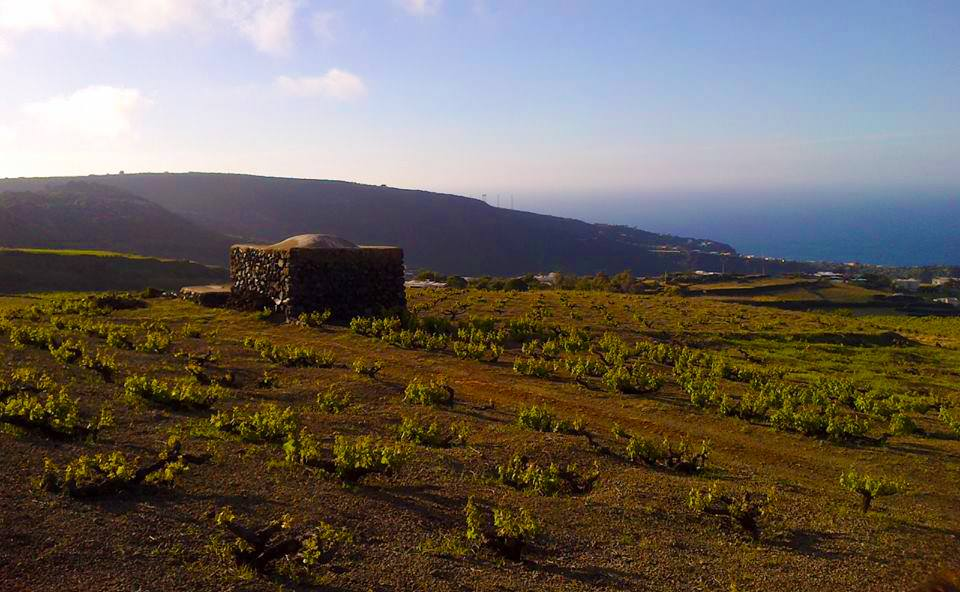
Traditional rural architecture (dammuso) and agricultural landscape

== See also ==
- Pantelleria
- Bush vine
- Zibibbo
- Passito di Pantelleria
- Dry stone
