= Giovanni Meli =

Italian poet (1740–1815)

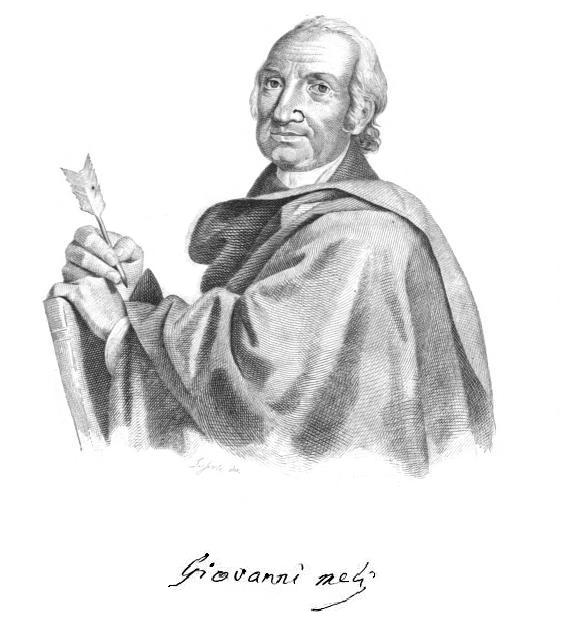
Giovanni Meli

Giovanni Meli (4 March 1740 – 20 December 1815) was an Italian poet.

Meli was born in Palermo. After studying philosophy and medicine he worked as a doctor in Cinisi in the province of Palermo. It was during this early period of his life that he discovered the bucolic poets and the poetic value of his native Sicilian language, which he used thereafter in all of his literary works. There is a Monument to Giovanni Meli in Piazza Stazione Lolli in Palermo, Sicily.

== Works ==
His first published piece, La Bucolica (1766-1772), was inspired by Arcadia by Jacopo Sannazaro. It was written while he was still working as a doctor in Cinisi.

He returned to Palermo soon after, already widely known as a scientist and poet. He dedicated the rest of his life to both collecting works of Sicilian poetry, but most importantly, writing and publishing his own works. His Poesii siciliani in five volumes was published in 1787, and an edition in six volumes was published in 1814.

Besides La bucolica, these collections also contain examples of his satirical verse, such as: La fata galanti (The courteous fairy, 1762); Don Chisciotti e Sanciu Panza (Don Quixote and Sancho Panza, 1785-1787, a parody inspired by Miguel de Cervantes' Don Quixote); Favuli murali (moral fables, 1810-1814; Origini dû munnu (the origin of the world, 1768); Elegii (elegies) e Canzunetti (little songs).

== Achievements ==
On the tondello (made in gold - unique example -, in silver and in bronze) the face of the poet with a graduate head is depicted on the obverse, while on the reverse the Meli is consecrated as the new "Sicilian Anacreon".

The only example in gold was delivered to Meli, together with an autograph letter sent on August 12 from Naples by Prince Leopold himself, composed as follows: "Abate Meli you liked to associate mine with your great name, dedicating your immortal poems to me, and you did it with so much spirit and with so much heart, that I would not be able to show you my liking enough: I should be showing you my particular esteem for your poetic talents and for your valuable personal qualities. I prefer to unite my desires with those of all the good ones, so that you may live long in virtue, and of the Letters of which you are the delight and the adornment.

Apollo was the father of Aesculapius, and it is perhaps for this reason that you are just as good a doctor, and therefore everyone must have a new interest in your prosperity. I have procured to eternalize my admiration for you, by having a Medal coined in your honor, like one in gold for you, and others in silver and bronze for your friends, and with these the assurances of my particular consideration".

== Example ==
=== Don Chisciotti e Sanciu Panza (Cantu quintu) ===
(~1790)

Sicilian	English
Stracanciatu di notti soli jiri;	Disguised he roams at night alone;
S'ammuccia ntra purtuni e cantuneri;	Hiding in any nook and cranny;
cu vacabunni ci mustra piaciri;	he enjoys the company of vagabonds;
poi lu so sbiu sunnu li sumeri,	however, donkeys are his real diversion,
li pruteggi e li pigghia a ben vuliri,	he protects them and looks after all their needs,
li tratta pri parenti e amici veri;	treating them as real family and friends;
siccomu ancora è n'amicu viraci	since he remains a true friend
di li bizzarri, capricciusi e audaci.	of all who are bizarre, capricious and bold.
