= Elio Galvagno =

Italian politician (born 1954)

Member of the Sicilian Regional Assembly
- In office 29 June 2006 – 29 October 2012

President of the Province of Enna
- In office 21 January 1994 – 28 May 2003
- Preceded by: Pier Francesco Battiato
- Succeeded by: Cataldo Salerno

Mayor of Centuripe
- In office 2 June 2015 – 6 October 2020
- In office 21 June 1988 – 3 August 1990

Personal details
- Born: Michele Galvagno; 18 May 1954 (age 72) Centuripe, Province of Enna, Italy
- Party: Christian Democracy (until 1994); Italian People's Party (1994–2001); The Daisy (2001–2007); Democratic Party (since 2007)
- Education: University of Catania

Michele Galvagno (born 18 May 1954), better known as Elio Galvagno, is an Italian politician who served as president of the Province of Enna from 1994 to 2003 and as a member of the Sicilian Regional Assembly from 2006 to 2012. He also served two terms as mayor of Centuripe.

== Political career ==
Galvagno began his political career in Christian Democracy. He was elected mayor of Centuripe in 1988 and served until 1990. He subsequently became a member of the Provincial Council of Enna and was appointed to the provincial executive.

In January 1994, Galvagno became president of the Province of Enna. He subsequently stood for election to the presidency in the 1994 provincial election, as the candidate of the Italian People's Party. He received 22.1% of the vote in the first round and won the runoff with 54.7%. In 1999, he was re-elected on a centre-left coalition, winning in the first round with 56.3%. He remained in office until 2003, when he was succeeded by Cataldo Salerno.

After leaving the presidency of the province, Galvagno was elected to the Sicilian Regional Assembly in the 2006 regional election for The Daisy in the Enna constituency. He was re-elected in the 2008 election as a candidate of the Democratic Party. During the 14th legislature he served on the Committee on Institutional Affairs, while during the 15th legislature he was vice-president of the Committee on Budget and Planning.

In 2015, Galvagno returned to local politics and was elected mayor of Centuripe with 53% of the vote.
