= List of Italian provinces by life expectancy =

Italy is administratively divided into 20 regions. Those are at the next level divided into provinces and metropolitan cities.

According to estimation of the Italian National Institute of Statistics (ISTAT), life expectancy at birth in the country in 2023 was 83.0 years (81.0 for male and 85.1 for female).

According to alternative estimation from the United Nations, in 2023 life expectancy in Italy was 83.72 years (81.57 for male, 85.75 for female).

Estimation of the World Bank Group for 2023: 83.70 years total (81.70 for male, 85.80 for female).

Estimation of Eurostat for 2023: 83.5 years total (81.4 for male, 85.4 for female).

According to estimation of the WHO for 2019, at that year life expectancy in Italy was 82.99 years (80.94 for male and 84.91 for female).
And healthy life expectancy was 71.43 years (70.85 years for male and 71.92 years for female).

== ISTAT (2025) ==
The tables and maps below are based on data from the Italian National Institute of Statistics (ISTAT). By default tables are sorted by 2025. The legends on all the maps are identical.

=== Statistics by regions ===
region	2025 (preliminary)				historical data															
region	overall	male	female	sex gap	2015	2015 →2019	2019	2019 →2020	2020	2020 →2021	2021	2021 →2022	2022	2022 →2023	2023	2023 →2024	2024	2024 →2025	2025	2015 →2025
Italy on average	83.7	81.7	85.7	4.0	82.3	0.9	83.2	−1.1	82.1	0.4	82.5	0.1	82.6	0.4	83.0	0.5	83.5	0.2	83.7	1.4
Trentino-Alto Adige/Südtirol	84.8	82.8	86.8	4.0	83.4	0.8	84.2	−1.4	82.8	0.8	83.6	0.2	83.8	0.6	84.4	0.3	84.7	0.1	84.8	1.4
Marche	84.4	82.6	86.4	3.8	83.0	1.0	84.0	−1.0	83.0	0.1	83.1	0.2	83.3	0.6	83.9	0.4	84.3	0.1	84.4	1.4
Veneto	84.4	82.5	86.5	4.0	82.9	0.9	83.8	−0.9	82.9	0.4	83.3	0.1	83.4	0.4	83.8	0.5	84.3	0.1	84.4	1.5
Tuscany	84.3	82.5	86.2	3.7	82.8	0.8	83.6	−0.5	83.1	0.1	83.2	0.1	83.3	0.5	83.8	0.3	84.1	0.2	84.3	1.5
Lombardy	84.3	82.4	86.2	3.8	82.8	0.8	83.6	−2.2	81.4	1.7	83.1	0.1	83.2	0.6	83.8	0.3	84.1	0.2	84.3	1.5
Emilia-Romagna	84.2	82.5	86.1	3.6	82.9	0.7	83.6	−1.1	82.5	0.5	83.0	0.3	83.3	0.3	83.6	0.5	84.1	0.1	84.2	1.3
Umbria	84.1	82.2	86.1	3.9	82.8	1.2	84.0	−0.6	83.4	−0.2	83.2	0.1	83.3	0.4	83.7	0.3	84.0	0.1	84.1	1.3
Friuli-Venezia Giulia	84.1	81.9	86.4	4.5	82.4	1.1	83.5	−0.9	82.6	−0.3	82.3	0.7	83.0	0.4	83.4	0.5	83.9	0.2	84.1	1.7
Aosta Valley	83.7	82.5	85.0	2.5	81.1	1.6	82.7	−1.8	80.9	1.4	82.3	0.0	82.3	0.9	83.2	−0.4	82.8	0.9	83.7	2.6
Liguria	83.7	81.8	85.8	4.0	82.2	0.9	83.1	−1.4	81.7	1.0	82.7	−0.2	82.5	0.6	83.1	0.5	83.6	0.1	83.7	1.5
Abruzzo	83.7	81.7	85.8	4.1	82.3	1.0	83.3	−0.7	82.6	0.0	82.6	0.0	82.6	0.4	83.0	0.5	83.5	0.2	83.7	1.4
Lazio	83.6	81.7	85.7	4.0	82.0	1.2	83.2	−0.6	82.6	0.0	82.6	0.3	82.9	0.0	82.9	0.5	83.4	0.2	83.6	1.6
Piedmont	83.6	81.6	85.7	4.1	82.1	0.8	82.9	−1.5	81.4	1.1	82.5	0.0	82.5	0.5	83.0	0.5	83.5	0.1	83.6	1.5
Apulia (Puglia)	83.5	81.5	85.6	4.1	82.3	0.9	83.2	−0.9	82.3	−0.3	82.0	0.6	82.6	0.2	82.8	0.5	83.3	0.2	83.5	1.2
Basilicata	83.1	80.9	85.4	4.5	82.0	0.5	82.5	−0.3	82.2	0.1	82.3	−0.2	82.1	0.4	82.5	0.7	83.2	−0.1	83.1	1.1
Sardinia	83.1	80.6	85.7	5.1	82.2	0.8	83.0	−0.7	82.3	0.3	82.6	−0.6	82.0	0.5	82.5	0.5	83.0	0.1	83.1	0.9
Calabria	82.9	80.8	85.0	4.2	81.7	0.7	82.4	−0.3	82.1	−0.5	81.6	0.1	81.7	0.2	81.9	0.7	82.6	0.3	82.9	1.2
Sicily	82.6	80.7	84.6	3.9	81.2	0.8	82.0	−0.5	81.5	−0.3	81.2	0.2	81.4	0.2	81.6	0.8	82.4	0.2	82.6	1.4
Molise	82.6	80.3	85.0	4.7	82.0	1.0	83.0	−0.8	82.2	−0.8	81.4	0.5	81.9	0.4	82.3	0.2	82.5	0.1	82.6	0.6
Campania	82.1	80.1	84.1	4.0	80.4	1.2	81.6	−0.7	80.9	−0.2	80.7	0.3	81.0	0.3	81.3	0.5	81.8	0.3	82.1	1.7

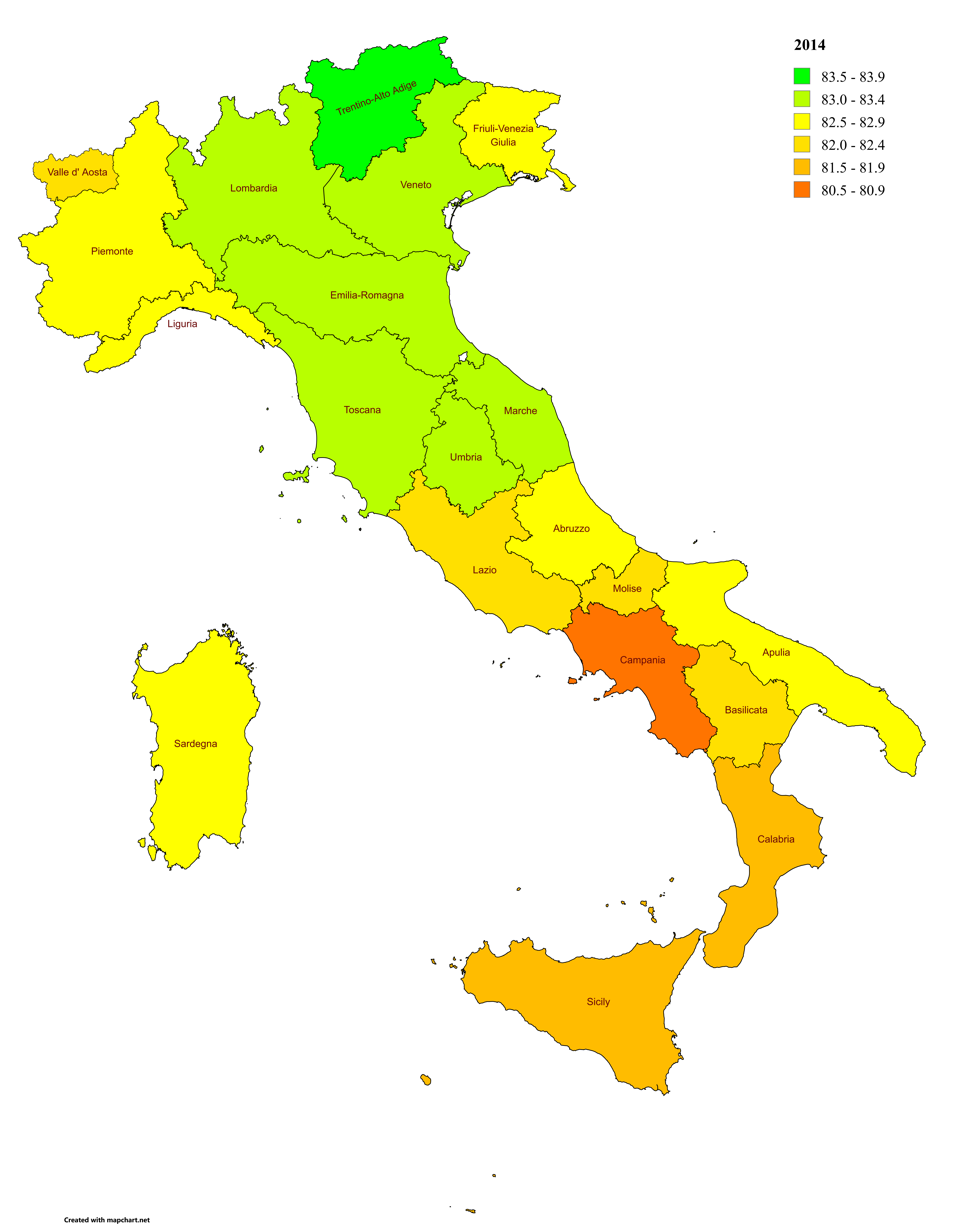
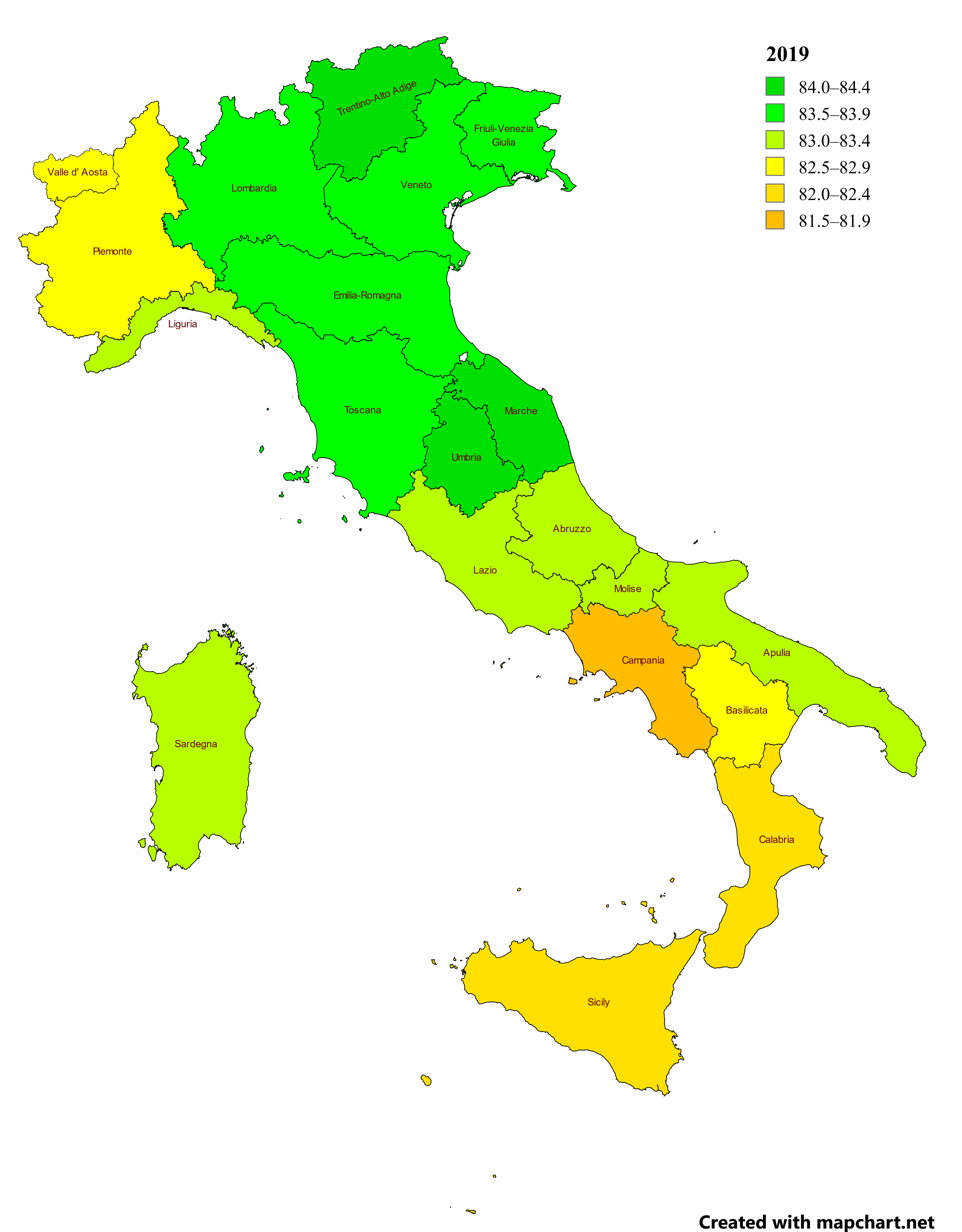
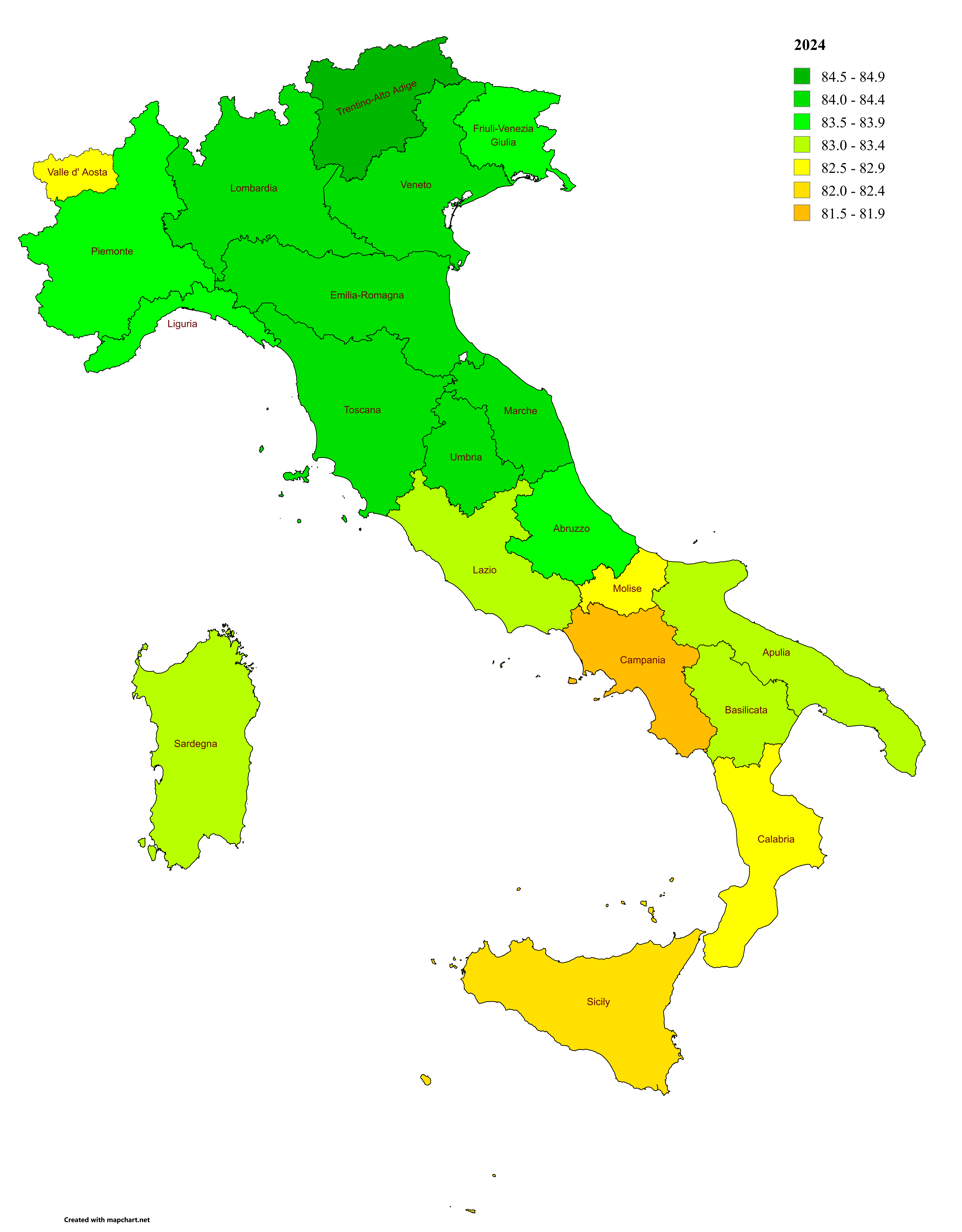
Maps of life expectancy in regions of Italy in 2014, 2019, 2024
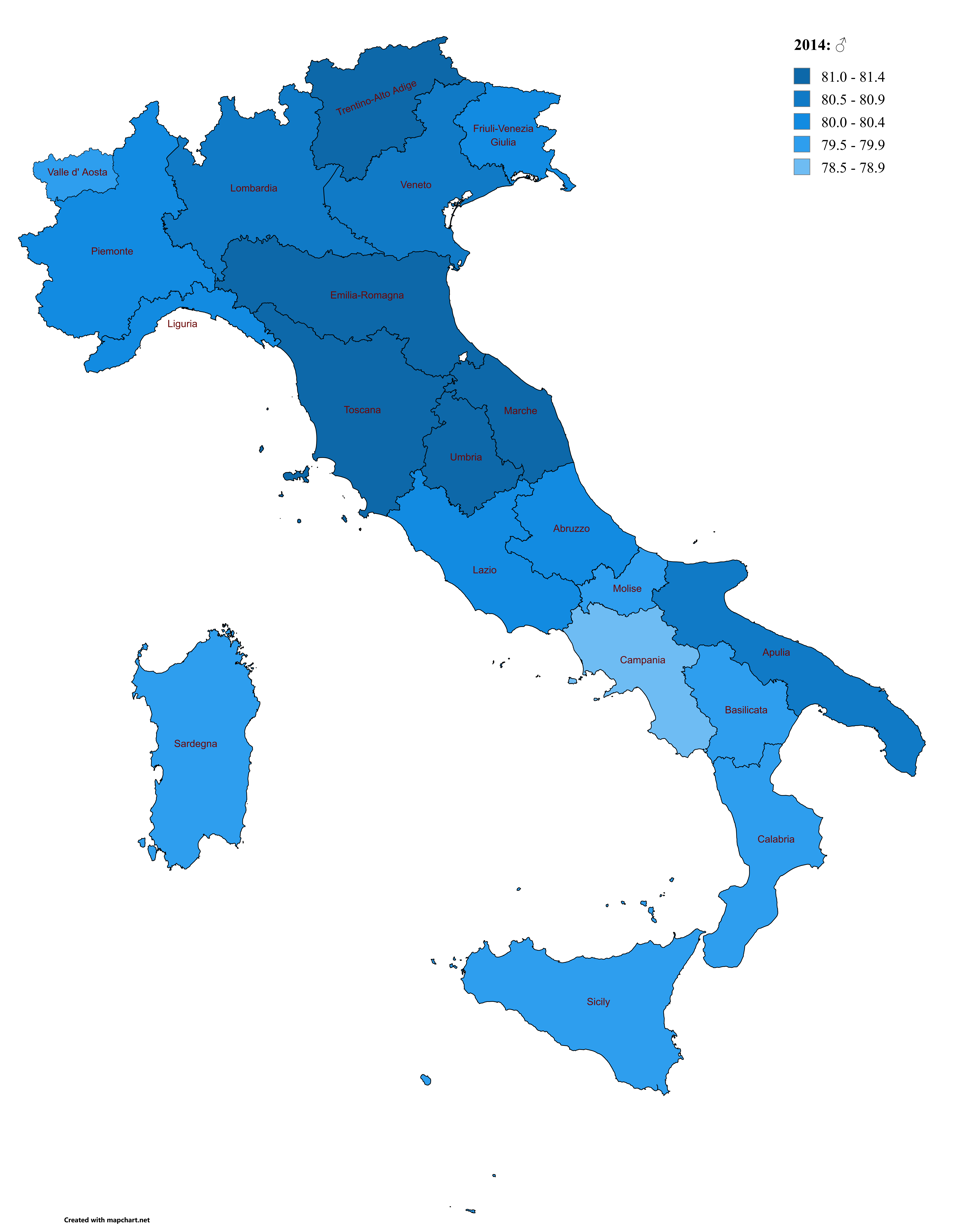
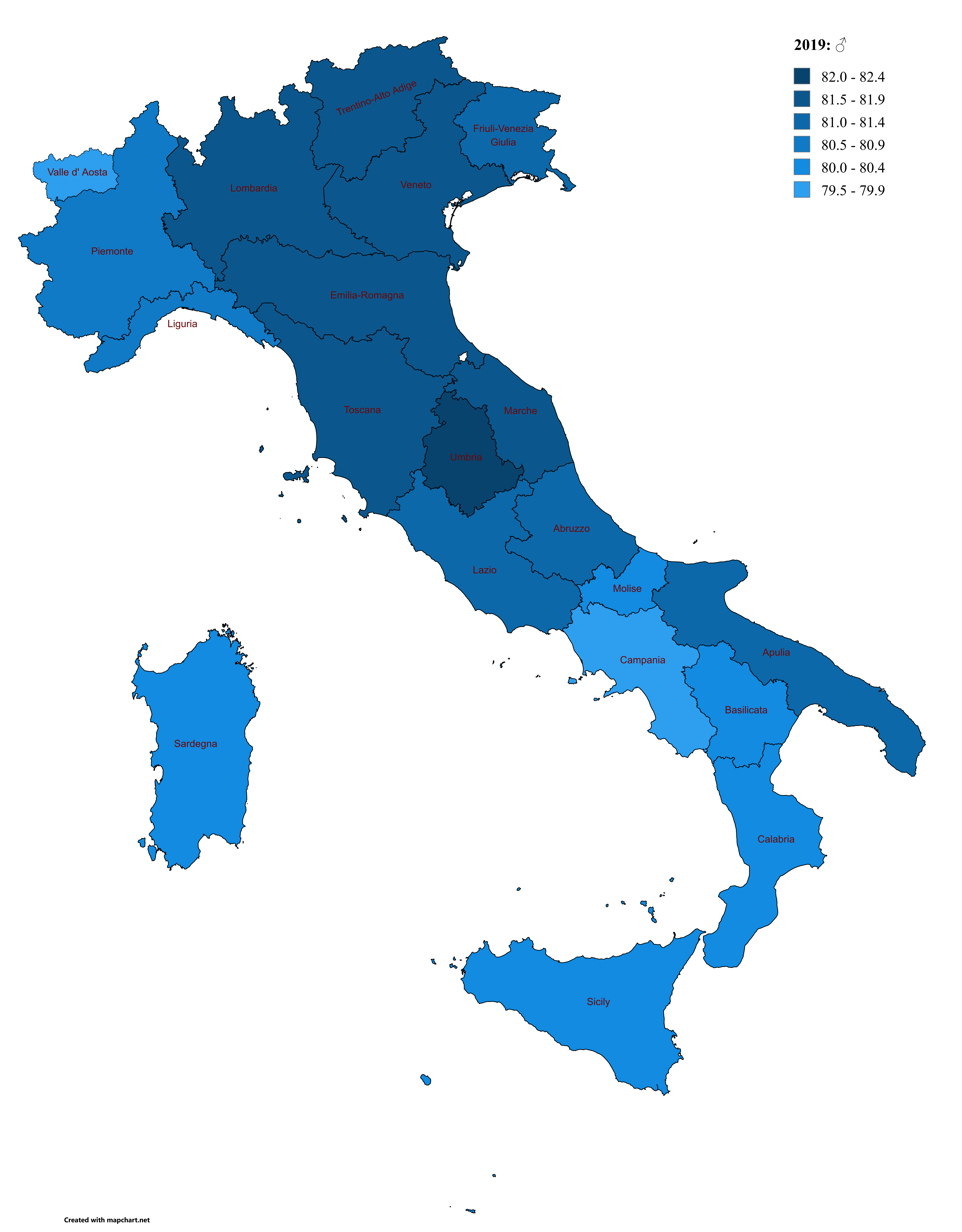
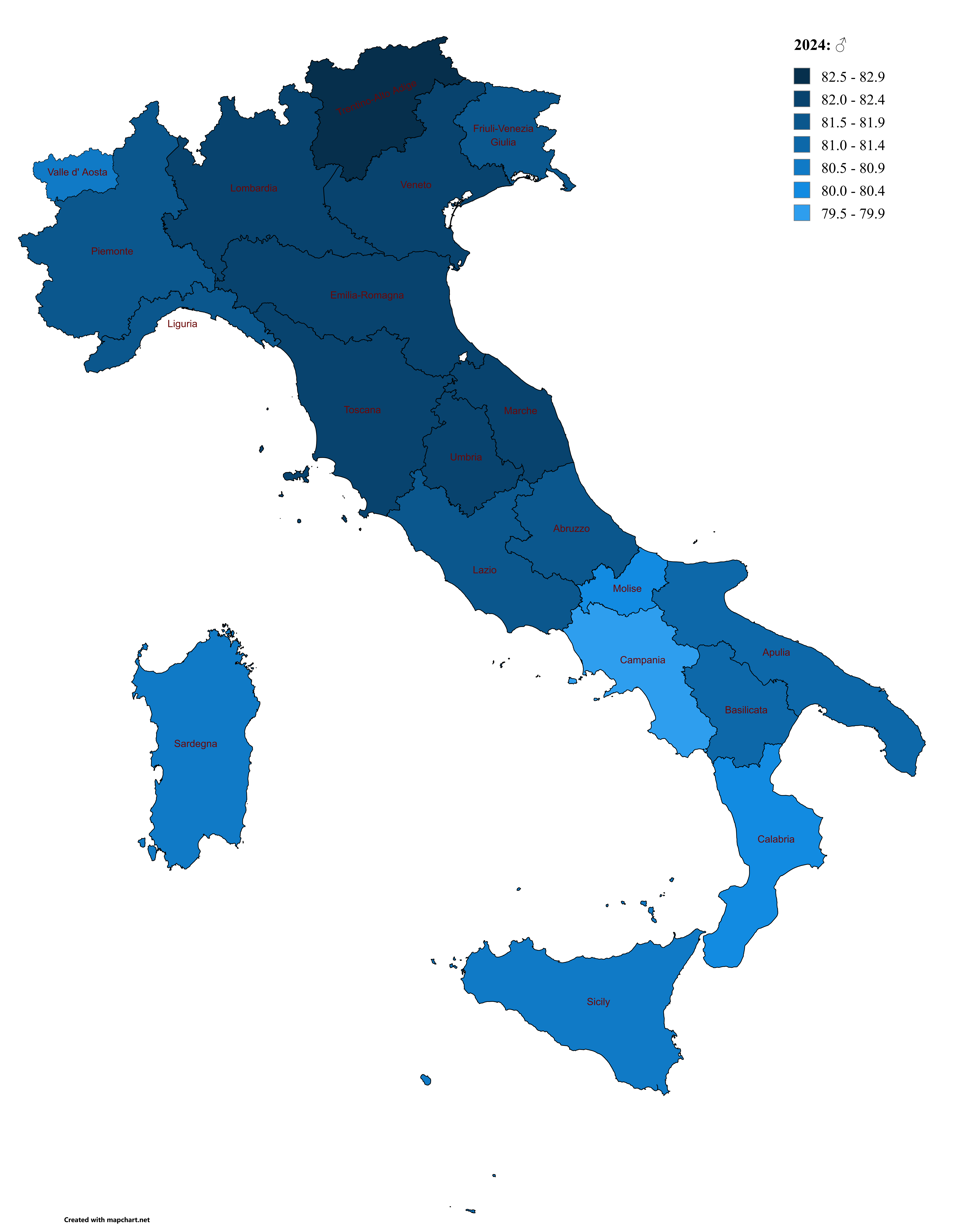
Maps of life expectancy for male
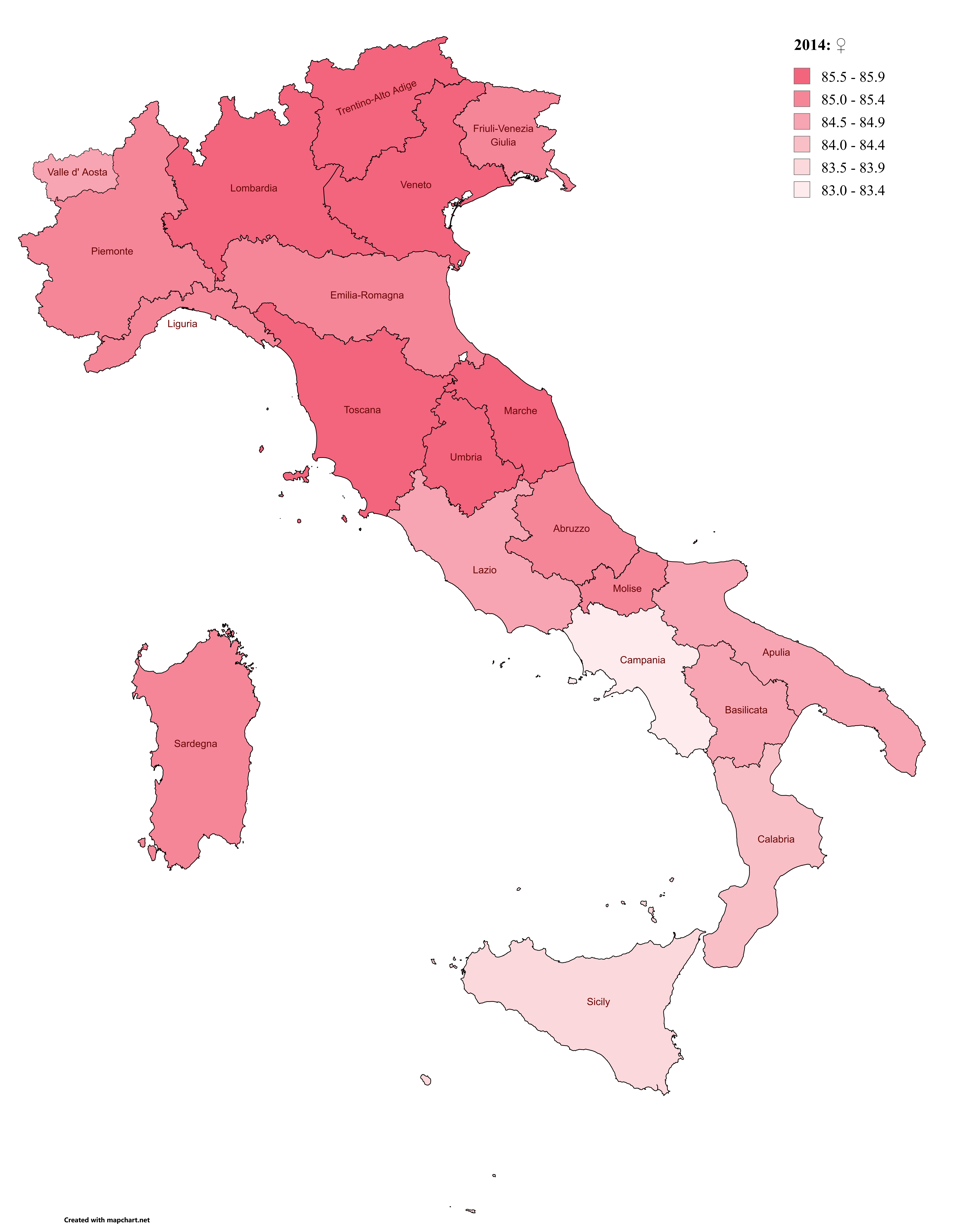
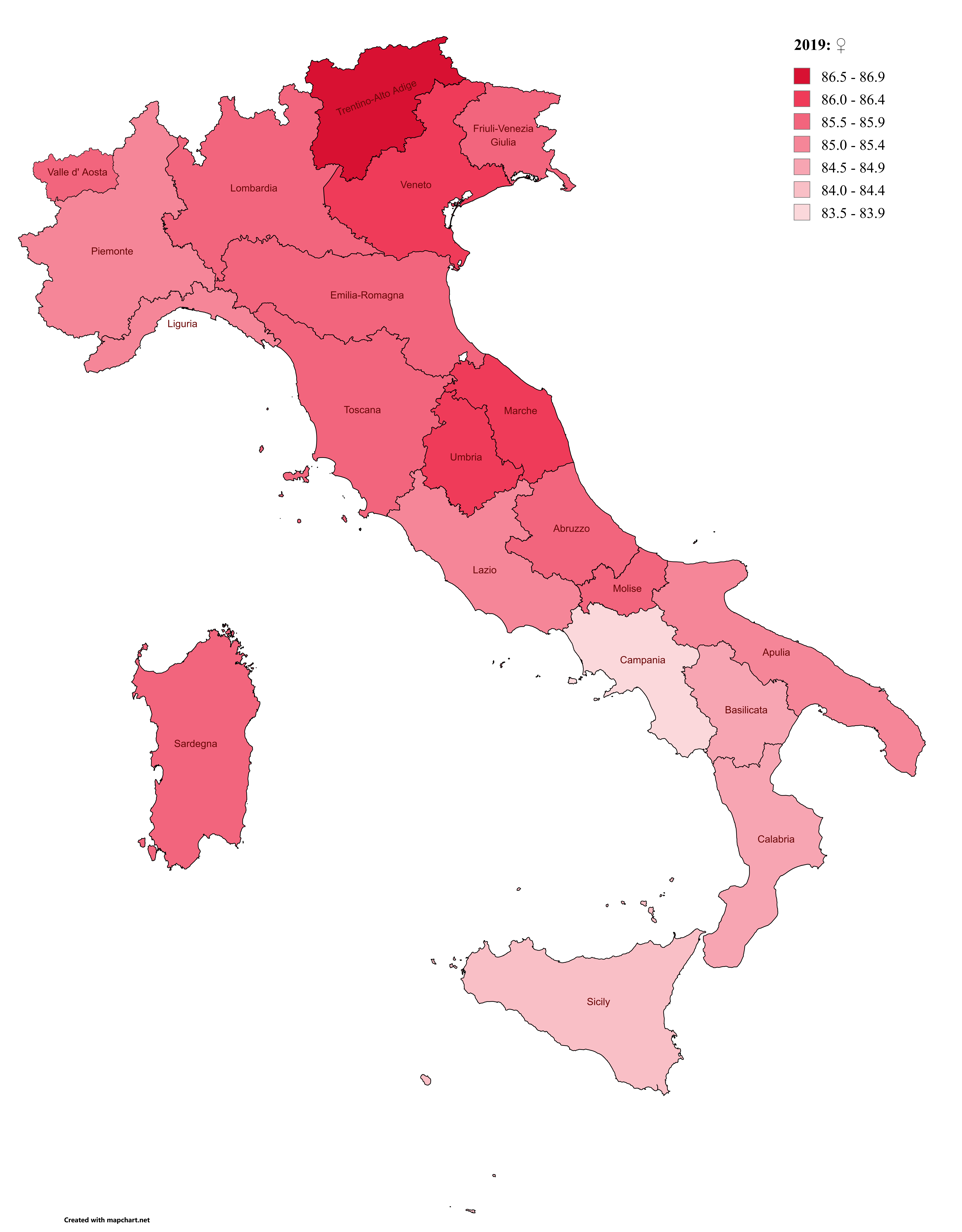
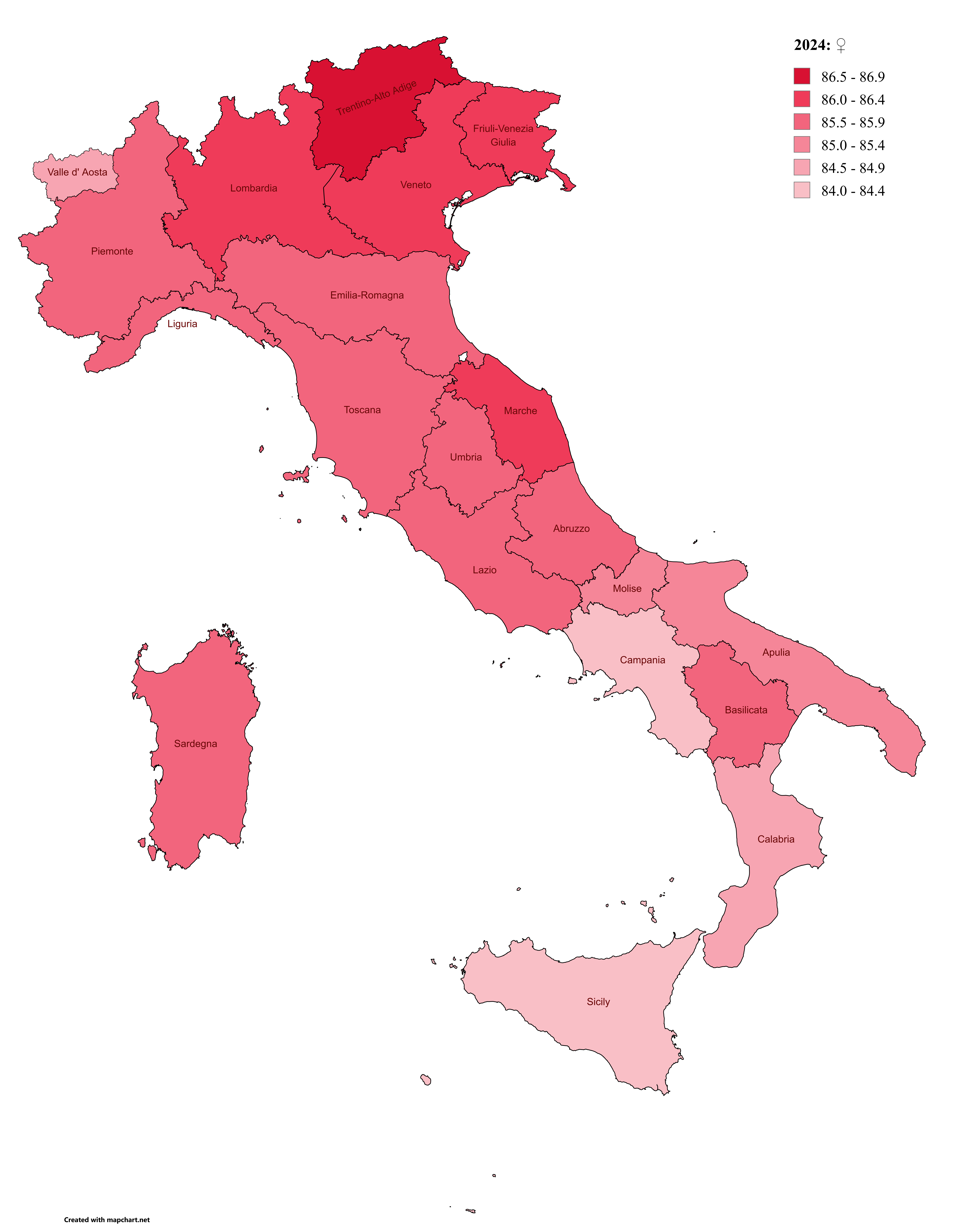
Maps of life expectancy for female

=== Statistics by province ===
province / metropolitan city	2025 (preliminary)				historical data															
province / metropolitan city	overall	male	female	sex gap	2015	2015 →2019	2019	2019 →2020	2020	2020 →2021	2021	2021 →2022	2022	2022 →2023	2023	2023 →2024	2024	2024 →2025	2025	2015 →2025
Italy on average	83.7	81.7	85.7	4.0	82.3	0.9	83.2	−1.1	82.1	0.4	82.5	0.1	82.6	0.4	83.0	0.5	83.5	0.2	83.7	1.4
Rimini	85.3	83.6	87.1	3.5	83.6	0.7	84.3	−1.6	82.7	0.6	83.3	0.3	83.6	0.9	84.5	0.1	84.6	0.7	85.3	1.7
Prato	85.2	83.7	86.9	3.2	83.4	1.1	84.5	−1.2	83.3	−0.8	82.5	1.0	83.5	1.0	84.5	0.0	84.5	0.7	85.2	1.8
Florence	85.0	83.3	86.9	3.6	83.4	0.9	84.3	−0.7	83.6	0.4	84.0	−0.1	83.9	0.8	84.7	0.0	84.7	0.3	85.0	1.6
Treviso	85.0	83.1	86.9	3.8	83.5	0.8	84.3	−0.7	83.6	0.3	83.9	0.2	84.1	0.3	84.4	0.6	85.0	0.0	85.0	1.5
Trento (Trentino)	85.0	83.0	87.2	4.2	83.5	0.8	84.3	−1.5	82.8	1.1	83.9	0.3	84.2	0.3	84.5	0.2	84.7	0.3	85.0	1.5
Ancona	85.0	83.0	87.0	4.0	83.2	1.1	84.3	−0.9	83.4	−0.3	83.1	0.3	83.4	0.6	84.0	0.6	84.6	0.4	85.0	1.8
Siena	84.9	83.4	86.4	3.0	83.2	0.5	83.7	0.2	83.9	−0.7	83.2	0.3	83.5	0.7	84.2	0.3	84.5	0.4	84.9	1.7
Padua	84.9	83.2	86.8	3.6	83.2	1.1	84.3	−0.7	83.6	0.1	83.7	0.0	83.7	0.4	84.1	0.4	84.5	0.4	84.9	1.7
Pordenone	84.9	82.9	86.9	4.0	83.2	1.2	84.4	−1.2	83.2	0.0	83.2	0.4	83.6	0.4	84.0	0.6	84.6	0.3	84.9	1.7
Pistoia	84.8	83.0	86.7	3.7	83.2	0.7	83.9	−0.4	83.5	−0.5	83.0	0.6	83.6	0.3	83.9	0.6	84.5	0.3	84.8	1.6
Milan	84.8	82.9	86.8	3.9	83.3	0.9	84.2	−2.0	82.2	1.5	83.7	−0.1	83.6	0.6	84.2	0.5	84.7	0.1	84.8	1.5
Vicenza	84.8	82.7	86.9	4.2	83.0	1.0	84.0	−1.2	82.8	0.8	83.6	0.0	83.6	0.6	84.2	0.5	84.7	0.1	84.8	1.8
Monza and Brianza	84.7	83.0	86.6	3.6	83.3	0.9	84.2	−1.7	82.5	1.3	83.8	0.0	83.8	0.7	84.5	0.3	84.8	−0.1	84.7	1.4
Como	84.7	82.9	86.7	3.8	83.0	0.6	83.6	−1.7	81.9	1.2	83.1	0.2	83.3	0.8	84.1	0.2	84.3	0.4	84.7	1.7
Bologna	84.6	83.0	86.3	3.3	83.0	1.0	84.0	−0.9	83.1	0.2	83.3	0.2	83.5	0.4	83.9	0.4	84.3	0.3	84.6	1.6
Forlì-Cesena	84.6	83.0	86.2	3.2	83.2	0.6	83.8	−0.7	83.1	−0.2	82.9	0.5	83.4	0.6	84.0	0.5	84.5	0.1	84.6	1.4
Verona	84.6	82.7	86.6	3.9	82.8	1.2	84.0	−1.4	82.6	1.1	83.7	−0.1	83.6	0.4	84.0	0.7	84.7	−0.1	84.6	1.8
Lecco	84.6	82.6	86.6	4.0	82.9	1.4	84.3	−2.1	82.2	1.2	83.4	0.0	83.4	1.0	84.4	0.5	84.9	−0.3	84.6	1.7
Ascoli Piceno	84.5	83.1	86.0	2.9	82.9	1.2	84.1	−0.7	83.4	−0.3	83.1	0.1	83.2	0.7	83.9	0.3	84.2	0.3	84.5	1.6
Macerata	84.5	82.8	86.2	3.4	82.9	1.2	84.1	−0.8	83.3	−0.4	82.9	0.3	83.2	0.8	84.0	0.1	84.1	0.4	84.5	1.6
Brescia	84.5	82.7	86.4	3.7	82.8	0.9	83.7	−2.5	81.2	1.8	83.0	0.5	83.5	0.6	84.1	0.3	84.4	0.1	84.5	1.7
South Tyrol (Bolzano)	84.5	82.7	86.4	3.7	83.2	0.7	83.9	−1.1	82.8	0.6	83.4	0.0	83.4	0.8	84.2	0.5	84.7	−0.2	84.5	1.3
Varese	84.5	82.7	86.3	3.6	82.9	0.8	83.7	−1.6	82.1	0.8	82.9	0.3	83.2	0.7	83.9	0.3	84.2	0.3	84.5	1.6
Perugia	84.5	82.6	86.5	3.9	83.1	1.3	84.4	−0.6	83.8	−0.6	83.2	0.3	83.5	0.5	84.0	0.4	84.4	0.1	84.5	1.4
Modena	84.4	82.5	86.3	3.8	83.3	0.7	84.0	−0.9	83.1	0.2	83.3	0.2	83.5	0.3	83.8	0.4	84.2	0.2	84.4	1.1
Pesaro and Urbino	84.3	82.4	86.3	3.9	83.2	0.8	84.0	−1.6	82.4	1.3	83.7	−0.3	83.4	0.7	84.1	0.5	84.6	−0.3	84.3	1.1
Bari	84.2	82.3	86.1	3.8	82.8	0.9	83.7	−0.9	82.8	−0.6	82.2	0.9	83.1	0.2	83.3	0.5	83.8	0.4	84.2	1.4
Venice	84.2	82.2	86.4	4.2	82.8	0.8	83.6	−1.0	82.6	0.4	83.0	0.1	83.1	0.6	83.7	0.5	84.2	0.0	84.2	1.4
Udine	84.2	82.2	86.3	4.1	82.3	1.3	83.6	−0.8	82.8	−0.6	82.2	0.8	83.0	0.7	83.7	0.4	84.1	0.1	84.2	1.9
Fermo	84.2	82.1	86.5	4.4	82.5	1.0	83.5	−0.3	83.2	−0.5	82.7	1.1	83.8	0.1	83.9	0.2	84.1	0.1	84.2	1.7
Reggio Emilia	84.1	82.5	85.9	3.4	82.8	0.7	83.5	−1.0	82.5	0.7	83.2	0.0	83.2	0.5	83.7	0.5	84.2	−0.1	84.1	1.3
Ravenna	84.1	82.4	85.9	3.5	83.2	0.4	83.6	−0.3	83.3	−0.2	83.1	0.3	83.4	0.5	83.9	0.5	84.4	−0.3	84.1	0.9
Parma	84.1	82.2	86.1	3.9	82.9	0.7	83.6	−2.2	81.4	1.8	83.2	0.1	83.3	0.6	83.9	0.3	84.2	−0.1	84.1	1.2
Piacenza	84.1	82.0	86.3	4.3	82.3	1.1	83.4	−3.2	80.2	2.7	82.9	0.1	83.0	0.0	83.0	0.7	83.7	0.4	84.1	1.8
Gorizia	84.1	81.8	86.6	4.8	82.1	0.9	83.0	−0.7	82.3	−0.1	82.2	0.5	82.7	0.5	83.2	0.8	84.0	0.1	84.1	2.0
Arezzo	84.0	82.3	85.8	3.5	83.1	0.7	83.8	−0.5	83.3	−0.3	83.0	0.2	83.2	0.4	83.6	0.5	84.1	−0.1	84.0	0.9
Bergamo	84.0	82.2	86.0	3.8	82.4	1.0	83.4	−3.7	79.7	3.7	83.4	−0.5	82.9	0.7	83.6	0.4	84.0	0.0	84.0	1.6
Turin	84.0	82.1	86.0	3.9	82.5	0.8	83.3	−1.5	81.8	1.0	82.8	0.0	82.8	0.6	83.4	0.5	83.9	0.1	84.0	1.5
La Spezia	84.0	82.1	86.0	3.9	82.3	1.2	83.5	−1.2	82.3	0.6	82.9	−0.3	82.6	0.8	83.4	0.3	83.7	0.3	84.0	1.7
Rome	84.0	82.1	86.0	3.9	82.3	1.2	83.5	−0.6	82.9	−0.1	82.8	0.4	83.2	0.0	83.2	0.6	83.8	0.2	84.0	1.7
Pisa	84.0	82.1	85.9	3.8	82.7	0.7	83.4	−0.4	83.0	0.3	83.3	−0.2	83.1	0.6	83.7	0.3	84.0	0.0	84.0	1.3
Mantua	84.0	82.0	86.0	4.0	82.6	0.6	83.2	−1.5	81.7	0.7	82.4	0.4	82.8	0.3	83.1	0.3	83.4	0.6	84.0	1.4
Teramo	84.0	81.9	86.3	4.4	82.1	1.1	83.2	−0.8	82.4	0.4	82.8	−0.1	82.7	0.7	83.4	0.3	83.7	0.3	84.0	1.9
Livorno	83.9	82.4	85.5	3.1	82.2	0.8	83.0	−0.3	82.7	0.3	83.0	−0.3	82.7	0.8	83.5	0.2	83.7	0.2	83.9	1.7
Genoa	83.9	82.1	85.9	3.8	82.1	1.0	83.1	−1.6	81.5	1.5	83.0	−0.4	82.6	0.7	83.3	0.5	83.8	0.1	83.9	1.8
Lucca	83.9	81.9	86.1	4.2	82.0	1.2	83.2	−0.5	82.7	0.0	82.7	0.4	83.1	0.2	83.3	0.5	83.8	0.1	83.9	1.9
Massa-Carrara	83.9	81.7	86.2	4.5	81.7	1.5	83.2	−1.4	81.8	1.0	82.8	−0.3	82.5	0.3	82.8	0.9	83.7	0.2	83.9	2.2
Chieti	83.8	81.9	85.8	3.9	82.5	0.9	83.4	−0.5	82.9	−0.2	82.7	0.1	82.8	−0.2	82.6	0.9	83.5	0.3	83.8	1.3
Savona	83.8	81.8	85.9	4.1	82.2	0.9	83.1	−1.0	82.1	0.4	82.5	0.2	82.7	0.5	83.2	0.6	83.8	0.0	83.8	1.6
Belluno	83.8	81.7	86.0	4.3	82.0	1.3	83.3	−1.0	82.3	0.7	83.0	−0.7	82.3	0.8	83.1	0.2	83.3	0.5	83.8	1.8
Aosta	83.7	82.5	85.0	2.5	81.1	1.6	82.7	−1.8	80.9	1.4	82.3	0.0	82.3	0.9	83.2	−0.4	82.8	0.9	83.7	2.6
Cuneo	83.7	81.9	85.6	3.7	82.0	0.9	82.9	−1.2	81.7	0.7	82.4	0.1	82.5	0.7	83.2	0.4	83.6	0.1	83.7	1.7
Grosseto	83.7	81.9	85.6	3.7	82.2	1.0	83.2	0.1	83.3	0.1	83.4	−0.2	83.2	0.1	83.3	−0.3	83.0	0.7	83.7	1.5
Novara	83.7	81.8	85.7	3.9	82.4	0.6	83.0	−1.4	81.6	1.2	82.8	−0.1	82.7	0.9	83.6	0.2	83.8	−0.1	83.7	1.3
L'Aquila	83.7	81.8	85.7	3.9	82.3	0.7	83.0	−0.4	82.6	0.0	82.6	−0.3	82.3	0.5	82.8	0.8	83.6	0.1	83.7	1.4
Cagliari	83.7	81.4	86.2	4.8	82.9	0.6	83.5	−0.1	83.4	0.4	83.8	−1.1	82.7	0.4	83.1	0.7	83.8	−0.1	83.7	0.8
Barletta-Andria-Trani	83.6	82.1	85.3	3.2	82.3	0.7	83.0	−1.3	81.7	0.2	81.9	1.0	82.9	0.2	83.1	0.7	83.8	−0.2	83.6	1.3
Matera	83.6	81.5	85.9	4.4	82.1	0.9	83.0	−0.3	82.7	0.2	82.9	−0.3	82.6	0.4	83.0	0.8	83.8	−0.2	83.6	1.5
Ferrara	83.6	81.4	85.9	4.5	81.5	1.2	82.7	−0.6	82.1	−0.3	81.8	0.3	82.1	0.8	82.9	0.3	83.2	0.4	83.6	2.1
Lecce	83.6	81.4	85.8	4.4	82.4	1.2	83.6	−0.4	83.2	−0.4	82.8	−0.1	82.7	0.3	83.0	0.4	83.4	0.2	83.6	1.2
Trieste	83.6	81.0	86.4	5.4	81.8	1.2	83.0	−0.8	82.2	−0.1	82.1	0.5	82.6	0.2	82.8	0.1	82.9	0.7	83.6	1.8
Cremona	83.5	81.8	85.3	3.5	82.0	1.4	83.4	−3.7	79.7	3.1	82.8	−0.1	82.7	0.8	83.5	0.1	83.6	−0.1	83.5	1.5
Terni	83.5	81.7	85.5	3.8	82.2	1.3	83.5	−0.6	82.9	0.3	83.2	−0.4	82.8	0.2	83.0	0.5	83.5	0.0	83.5	1.3
Sondrio	83.5	81.6	85.5	3.9	82.4	0.1	82.5	−1.7	80.8	1.8	82.6	0.2	82.8	0.6	83.4	−0.3	83.1	0.4	83.5	1.1
Biella	83.5	81.4	85.7	4.3	81.4	1.4	82.8	−1.5	81.3	0.9	82.2	0.2	82.4	0.3	82.7	0.4	83.1	0.4	83.5	2.1
Taranto	83.5	81.2	85.9	4.7	82.6	0.4	83.0	−0.3	82.7	−1.0	81.7	0.7	82.4	0.2	82.6	0.3	82.9	0.6	83.5	0.9
Pescara	83.5	81.1	86.1	5.0	82.3	1.3	83.6	−1.1	82.5	−0.1	82.4	0.2	82.6	0.9	83.5	0.2	83.7	−0.2	83.5	1.2
Vibo Valentia	83.5	81.1	86.0	4.9	81.8	0.7	82.5	−0.2	82.3	−0.6	81.7	0.1	81.8	0.5	82.3	1.0	83.3	0.2	83.5	1.7
Ragusa	83.4	81.8	85.1	3.3	81.9	0.7	82.6	−0.6	82.0	0.2	82.2	−0.1	82.1	0.2	82.3	1.0	83.3	0.1	83.4	1.5
Lodi	83.4	81.3	85.6	4.3	81.9	1.8	83.7	−3.7	80.0	2.6	82.6	−0.1	82.5	0.9	83.4	0.2	83.6	−0.2	83.4	1.5
Imperia	83.3	81.4	85.4	4.0	82.2	0.5	82.7	−1.1	81.6	0.6	82.2	−0.5	81.7	0.6	82.3	0.9	83.2	0.1	83.3	1.1
Asti	83.3	81.2	85.5	4.3	81.6	0.8	82.4	−1.5	80.9	0.9	81.8	0.2	82.0	0.8	82.8	0.4	83.2	0.1	83.3	1.7
Rieti	83.3	81.1	85.6	4.5	81.7	1.4	83.1	−0.8	82.3	0.2	82.5	−0.5	82.0	0.3	82.3	0.3	82.6	0.7	83.3	1.6
Catanzaro	83.2	81.4	85.1	3.7	82.1	0.7	82.8	−0.2	82.6	−0.3	82.3	−0.2	82.1	0.5	82.6	0.5	83.1	0.1	83.2	1.1
Latina	83.2	81.3	85.2	3.9	82.0	1.3	83.3	−0.6	82.7	0.0	82.7	−0.2	82.5	0.1	82.6	0.4	83.0	0.2	83.2	1.2
Brindisi	83.2	81.3	85.2	3.9	82.0	0.8	82.8	−0.4	82.4	0.2	82.6	−0.2	82.4	0.0	82.4	0.6	83.0	0.2	83.2	1.2
Reggio Calabria	83.2	81.2	85.3	4.1	81.6	0.8	82.4	−0.2	82.2	−0.6	81.6	0.0	81.6	0.4	82.0	0.6	82.6	0.6	83.2	1.6
Viterbo	83.2	81.1	85.4	4.3	81.1	1.1	82.2	−0.1	82.1	0.0	82.1	−0.3	81.8	0.5	82.3	0.2	82.5	0.7	83.2	2.1
Verbano-Cusio-Ossola	83.2	80.9	85.7	4.8	81.6	1.5	83.1	−1.2	81.9	1.1	83.0	−0.6	82.4	0.6	83.0	0.2	83.2	0.0	83.2	1.6
Alessandria	83.1	81.3	85.0	3.7	81.6	0.6	82.2	−1.9	80.3	1.9	82.2	−0.6	81.6	0.7	82.3	0.5	82.8	0.3	83.1	1.5
Foggia	83.1	80.9	85.3	4.4	82.0	0.7	82.7	−1.5	81.2	0.1	81.3	0.7	82.0	0.4	82.4	0.4	82.8	0.3	83.1	1.1
Nuoro	83.1	80.4	86.0	5.6	81.7	1.2	82.9	−0.7	82.2	−0.2	82.0	−0.4	81.6	1.0	82.6	0.3	82.9	0.2	83.1	1.4
Trapani	83.0	81.4	84.8	3.4	81.6	0.5	82.1	0.1	82.2	−0.6	81.6	−0.1	81.5	0.3	81.8	0.7	82.5	0.5	83.0	1.4
Pavia	83.0	81.1	85.0	3.9	81.6	0.7	82.3	−2.3	80.0	1.8	81.8	0.1	81.9	0.4	82.3	0.3	82.6	0.4	83.0	1.4
South Sardinia	83.0	80.6	85.5	4.9	80.9	1.9	82.8	−0.4	82.4	−0.2	82.2	−0.1	82.1	0.0	82.1	0.6	82.7	0.3	83.0	2.1
Sassari	83.0	80.5	85.7	5.2	82.6	0.4	83.0	−1.0	82.0	0.7	82.7	−0.9	81.8	0.8	82.6	0.3	82.9	0.1	83.0	0.4
Rovigo	83.0	80.5	85.6	5.1	81.9	1.3	83.2	−1.0	82.2	−0.1	82.1	−0.2	81.9	0.9	82.8	0.4	83.2	−0.2	83.0	1.1
Frosinone	82.9	80.7	85.2	4.5	81.9	0.6	82.5	−0.4	82.1	−0.7	81.4	0.6	82.0	0.2	82.2	0.7	82.9	0.0	82.9	1.0
Potenza	82.9	80.7	85.2	4.5	82.0	0.3	82.3	−0.2	82.1	0.0	82.1	−0.2	81.9	0.4	82.3	0.8	83.1	−0.2	82.9	0.9
Campobasso	82.9	80.4	85.6	5.2	82.0	1.3	83.3	−0.9	82.4	−1.0	81.4	0.7	82.1	0.6	82.7	0.0	82.7	0.2	82.9	0.9
Agrigento	82.8	80.8	84.9	4.1	81.5	0.3	81.8	0.0	81.8	−0.6	81.2	0.2	81.4	0.0	81.4	0.8	82.2	0.6	82.8	1.3
Oristano	82.8	80.7	85.1	4.4	82.0	1.2	83.2	−1.2	82.0	0.3	82.3	−0.3	82.0	0.8	82.8	0.0	82.8	0.0	82.8	0.8
Salerno	82.8	80.7	84.9	4.2	81.2	1.0	82.2	−0.2	82.0	−0.5	81.5	0.3	81.8	0.3	82.1	0.6	82.7	0.1	82.8	1.6
Palermo	82.7	81.0	84.5	3.5	81.4	0.7	82.1	−0.6	81.5	−0.2	81.3	0.5	81.8	0.0	81.8	0.8	82.6	0.1	82.7	1.3
Enna	82.7	80.9	84.5	3.6	81.3	1.0	82.3	−0.9	81.4	−0.2	81.2	−0.3	80.9	0.4	81.3	1.5	82.8	−0.1	82.7	1.4
Catania	82.7	80.8	84.8	4.0	81.2	0.8	82.0	−0.4	81.6	−0.2	81.4	0.0	81.4	0.3	81.7	0.8	82.5	0.2	82.7	1.5
Crotone	82.7	80.7	84.9	4.2	81.4	0.9	82.3	−0.8	81.5	−0.5	81.0	−0.2	80.8	1.0	81.8	0.7	82.5	0.2	82.7	1.3
Avellino	82.6	80.6	84.7	4.1	81.5	0.8	82.3	−0.9	81.4	0.2	81.6	0.1	81.7	0.7	82.4	0.2	82.6	0.0	82.6	1.1
Cosenza	82.6	80.5	84.8	4.3	81.8	0.6	82.4	−0.3	82.1	−0.6	81.5	0.2	81.7	0.0	81.7	0.6	82.3	0.3	82.6	0.8
Benevento	82.6	80.2	85.1	4.9	81.1	1.4	82.5	−0.3	82.2	−0.5	81.7	0.1	81.8	0.4	82.2	0.1	82.3	0.3	82.6	1.5
Caltanissetta	82.5	80.6	84.5	3.9	81.0	0.1	81.1	0.2	81.3	−0.6	80.7	0.4	81.1	0.3	81.4	0.6	82.0	0.5	82.5	1.5
Vercelli	82.5	80.0	85.1	5.1	81.6	0.8	82.4	−2.2	80.2	1.4	81.6	0.1	81.7	0.3	82.0	0.6	82.6	−0.1	82.5	0.9
Messina	82.4	80.3	84.6	4.3	81.1	1.0	82.1	−0.2	81.9	−0.7	81.2	−0.2	81.0	0.7	81.7	0.7	82.4	0.0	82.4	1.3
Syracuse	82.4	80.3	84.5	4.2	80.7	0.8	81.5	−0.4	81.1	−0.7	80.4	0.2	80.6	0.9	81.5	0.1	81.6	0.8	82.4	1.7
Isernia	82.1	80.1	84.1	4.0	81.7	0.8	82.5	−0.7	81.8	−0.3	81.5	0.1	81.6	0.1	81.7	0.4	82.1	0.0	82.1	0.4
Naples	81.9	80.0	83.8	3.8	79.9	1.4	81.3	−0.9	80.4	−0.1	80.3	0.4	80.7	0.4	81.1	0.5	81.6	0.3	81.9	2.0
Caserta	81.9	79.9	84.1	4.2	80.4	1.1	81.5	−0.8	80.7	0.0	80.7	0.1	80.8	0.1	80.9	0.6	81.5	0.4	81.9	1.5

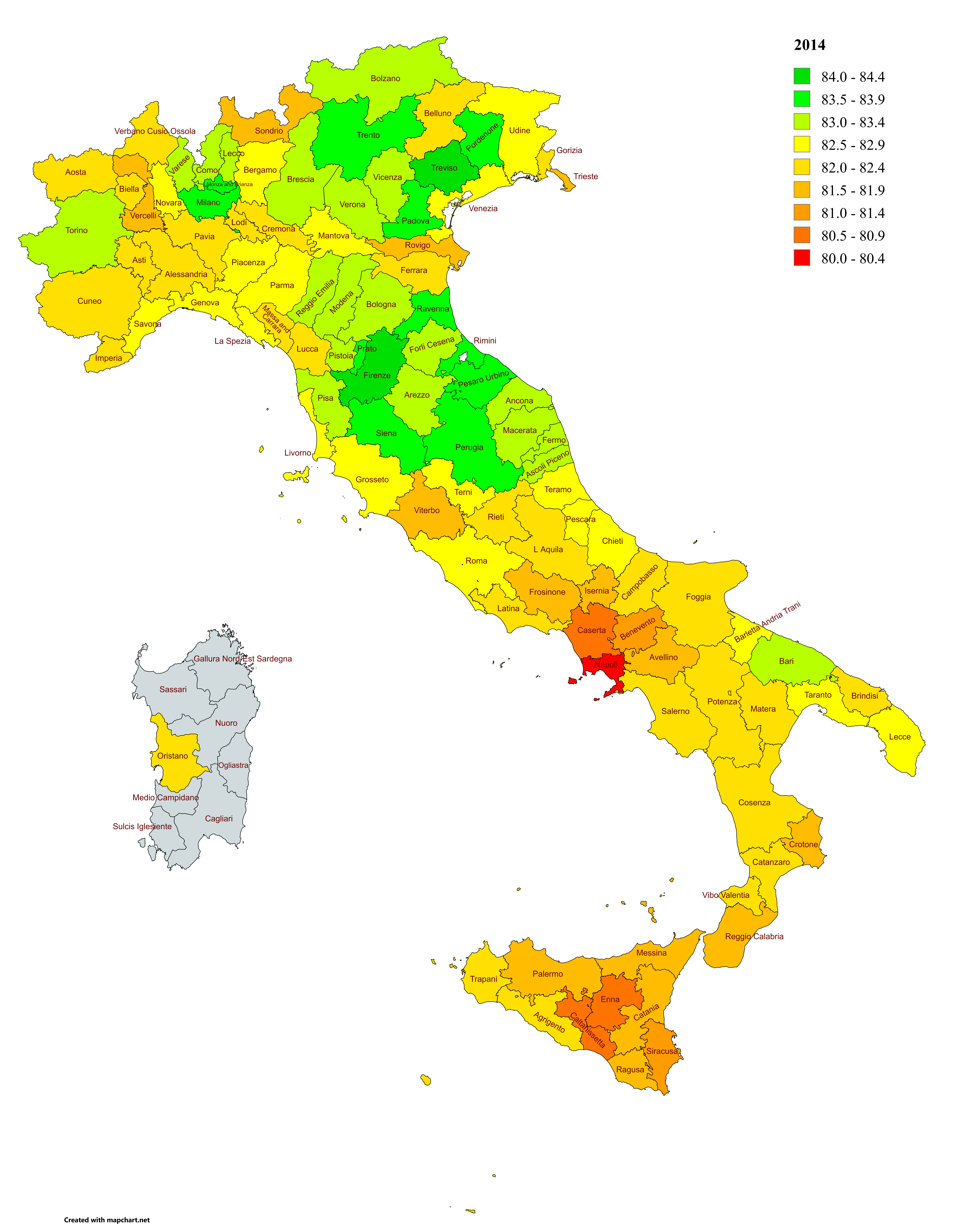
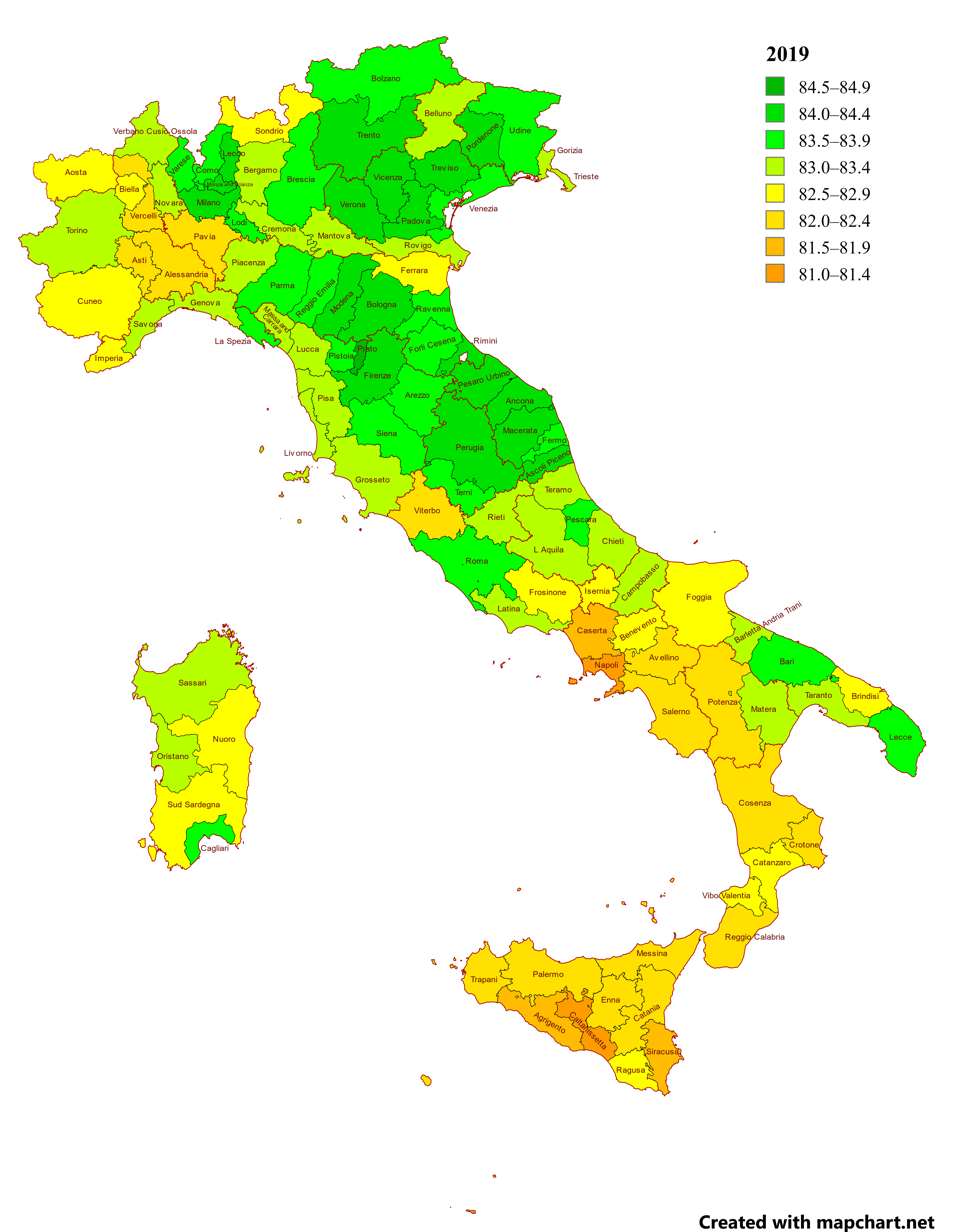
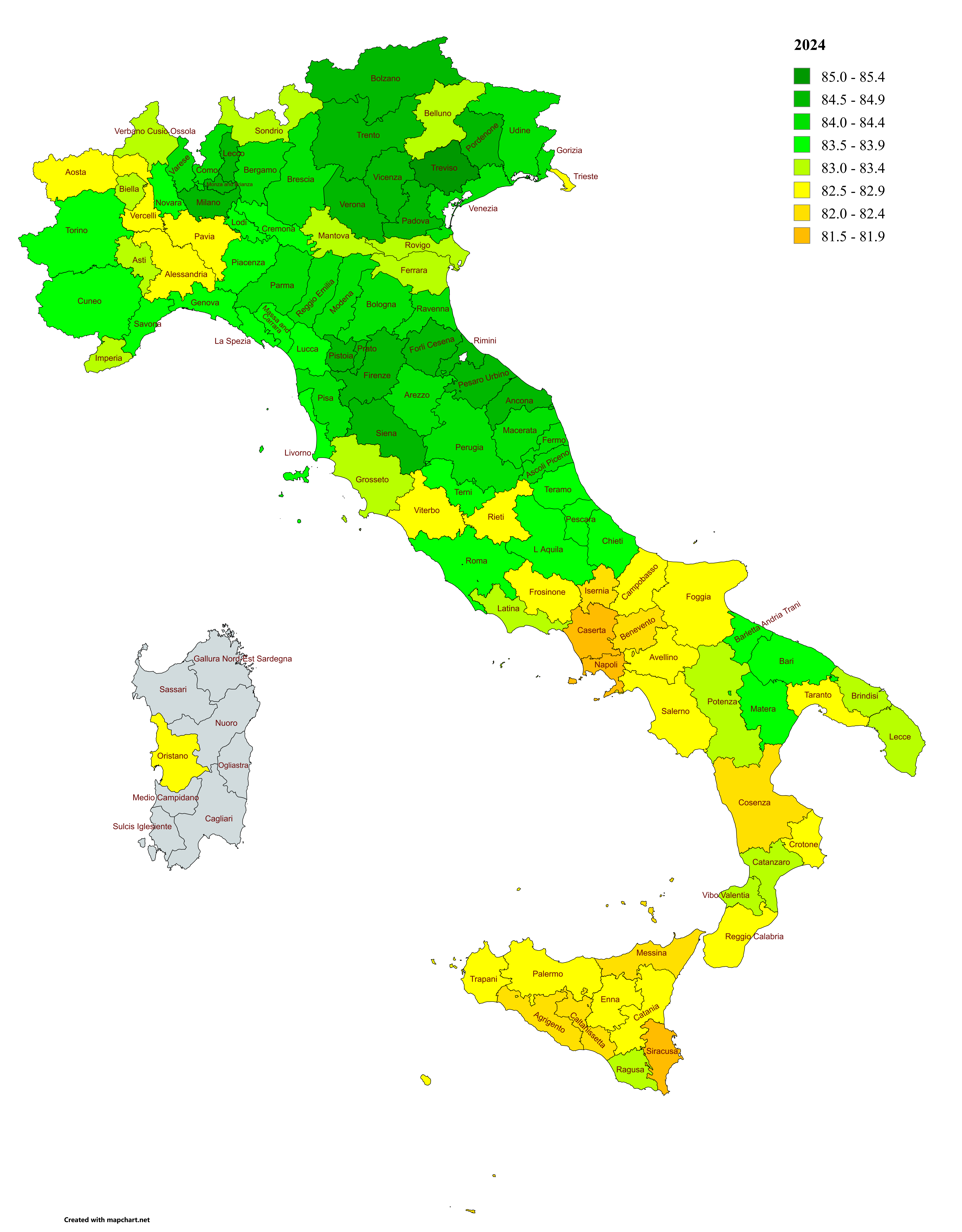
Maps of life expectancy in provinces and metropolitan cities of Italy in 2014, 2019, 2024
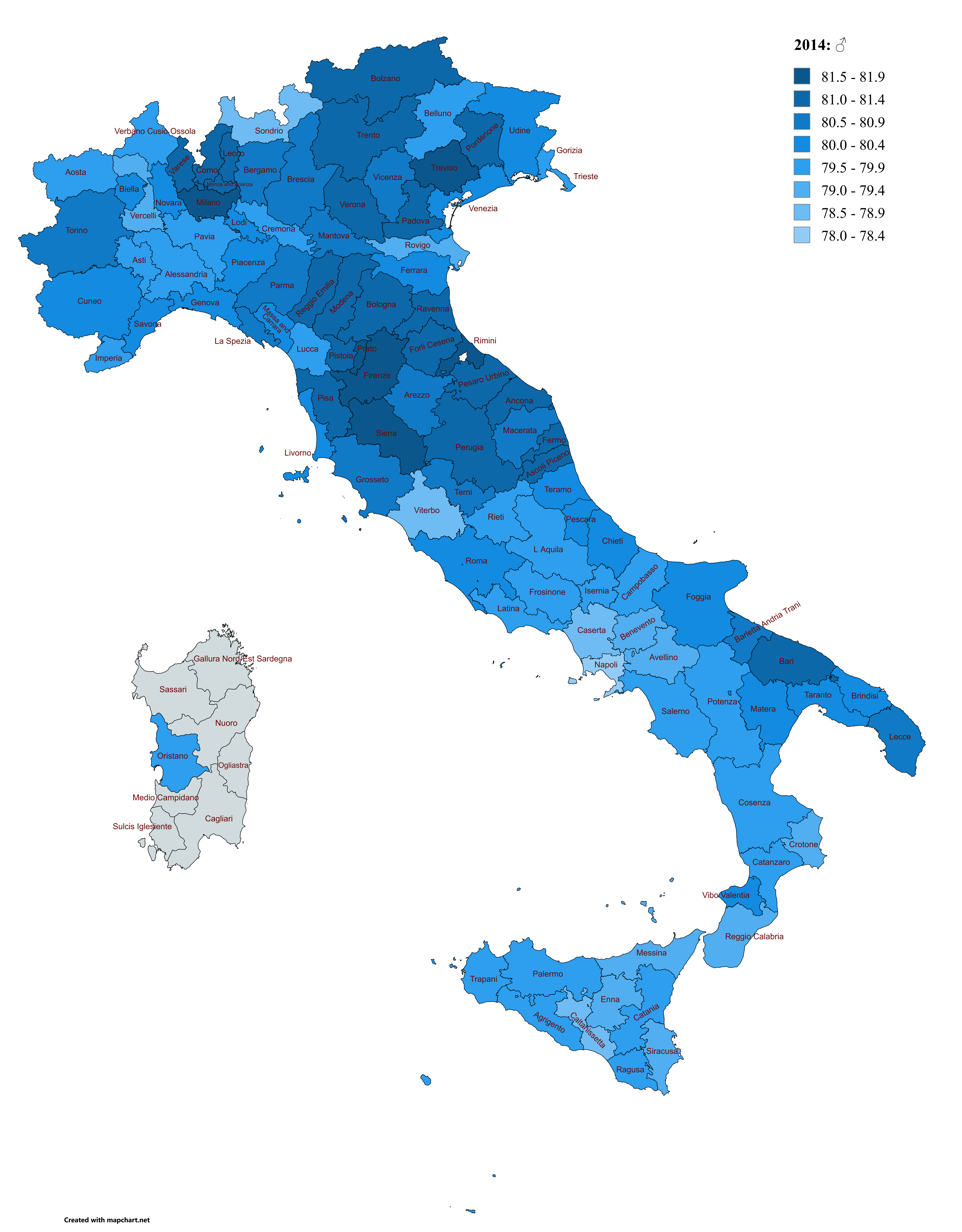
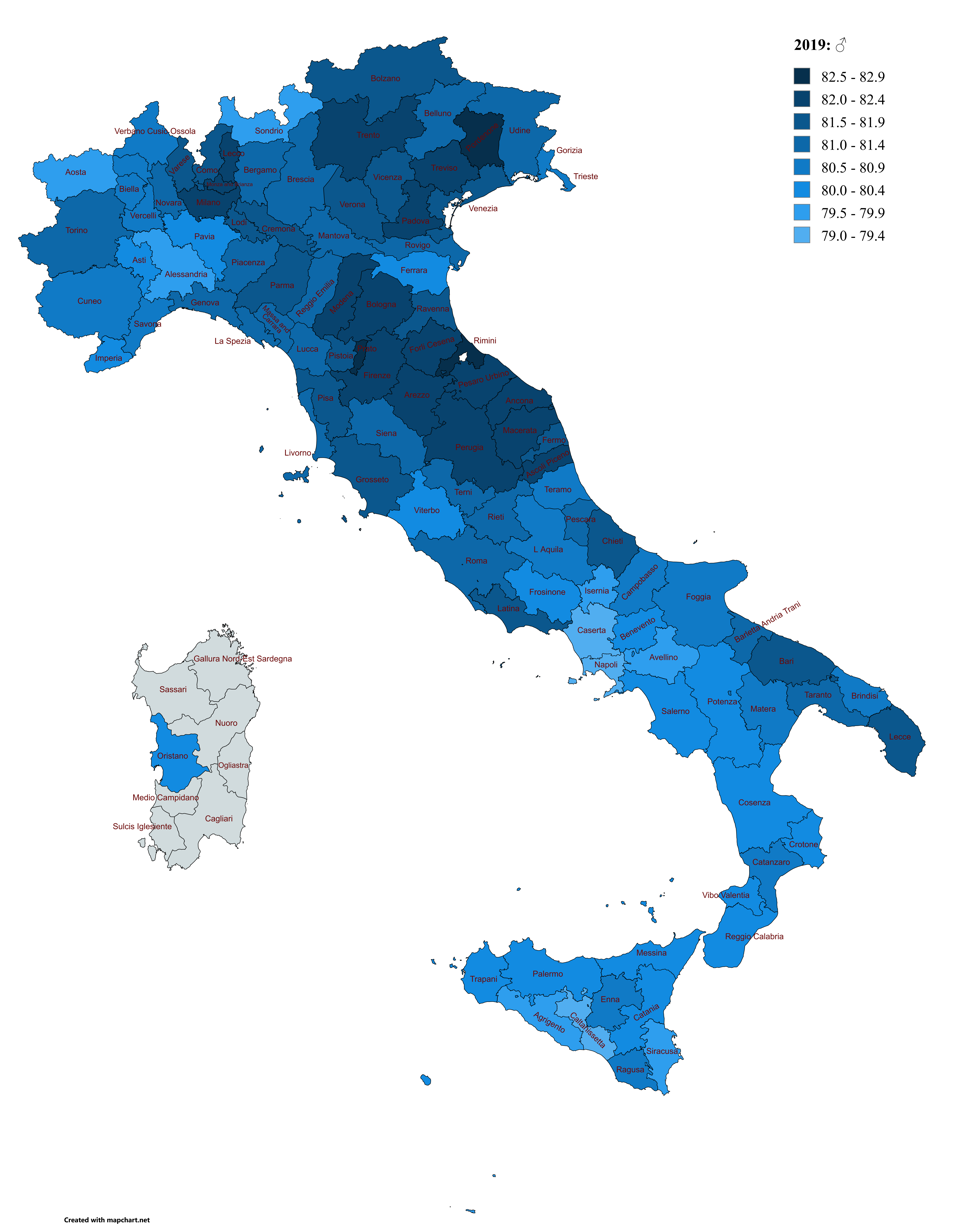
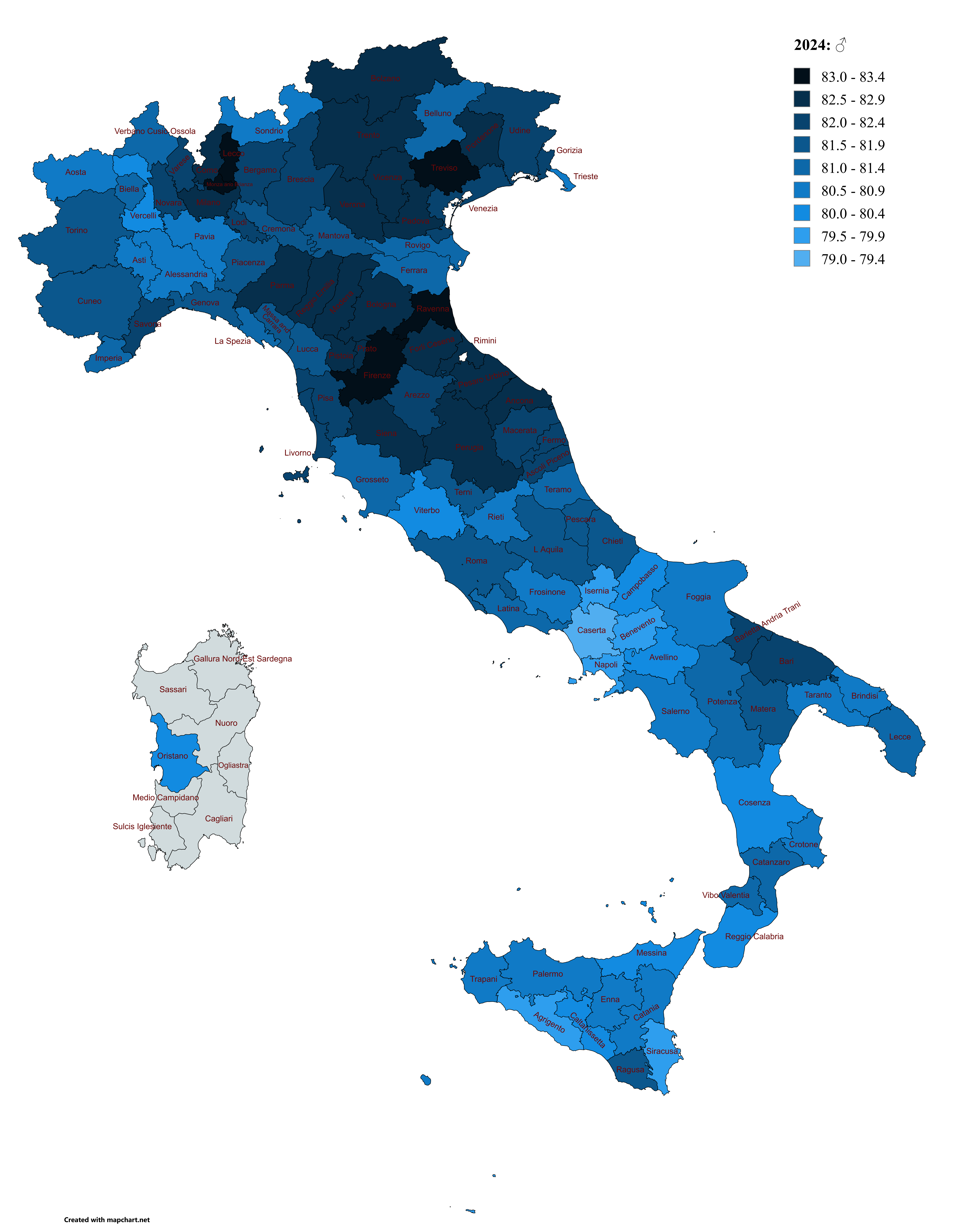
Maps of life expectancy for male
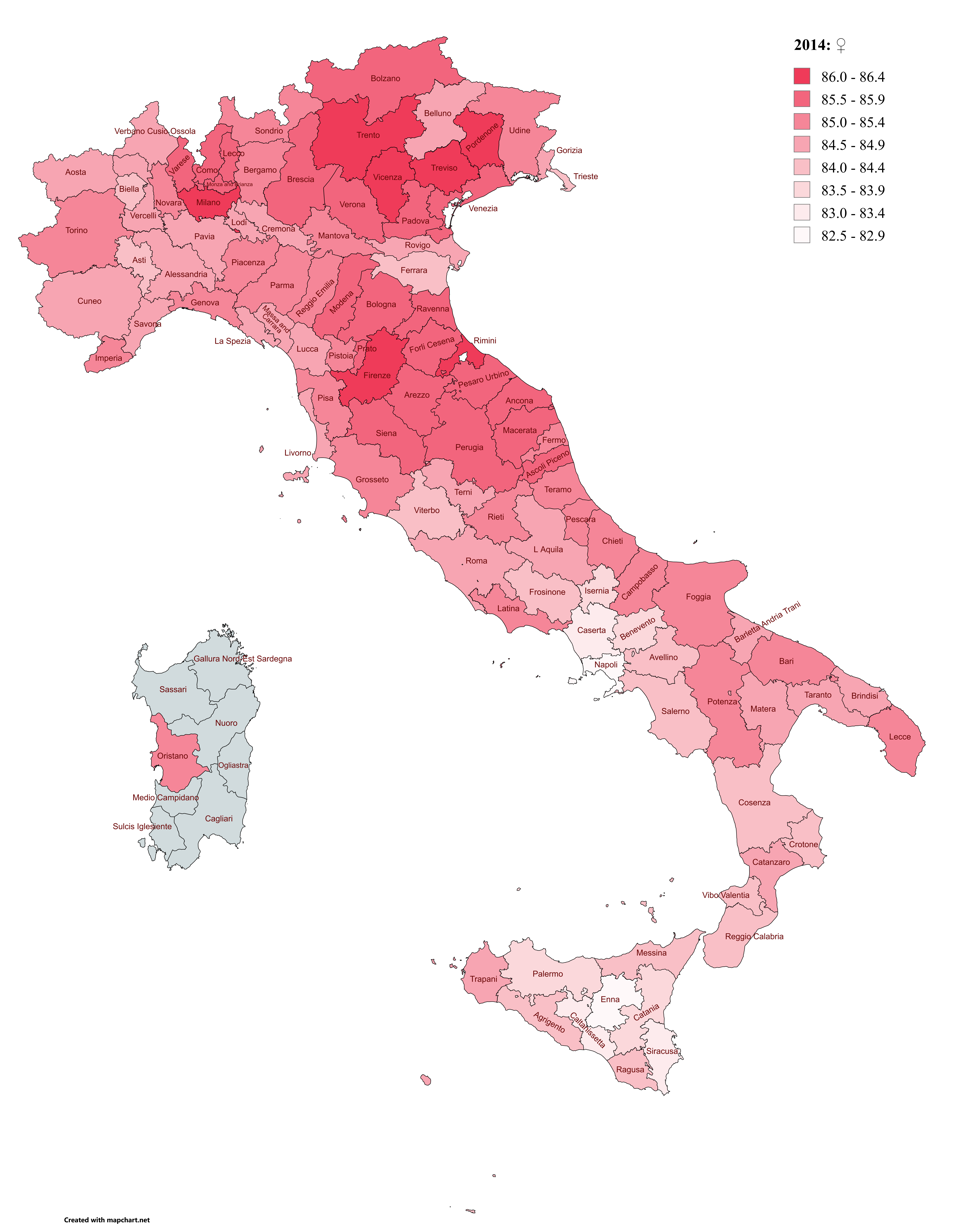
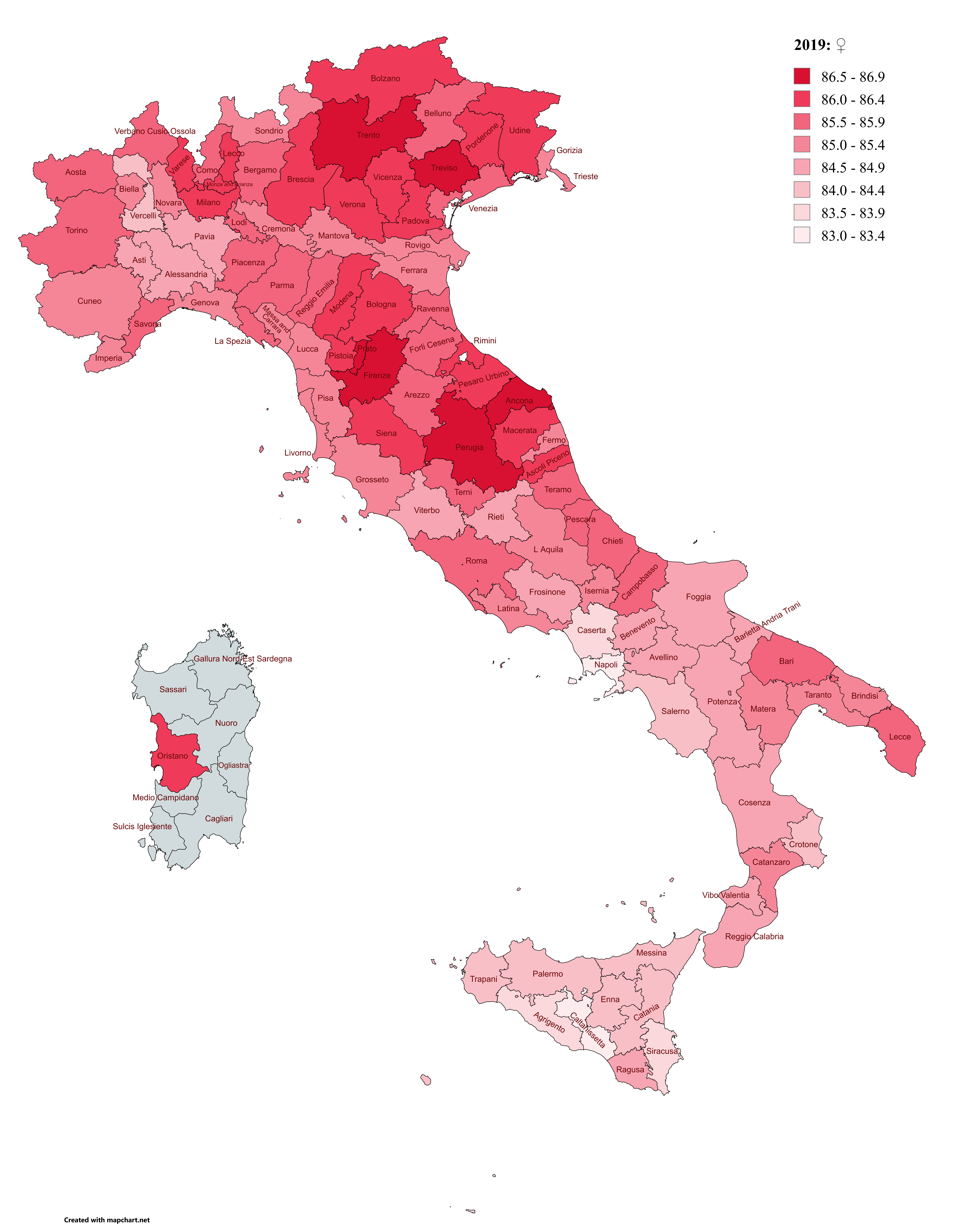
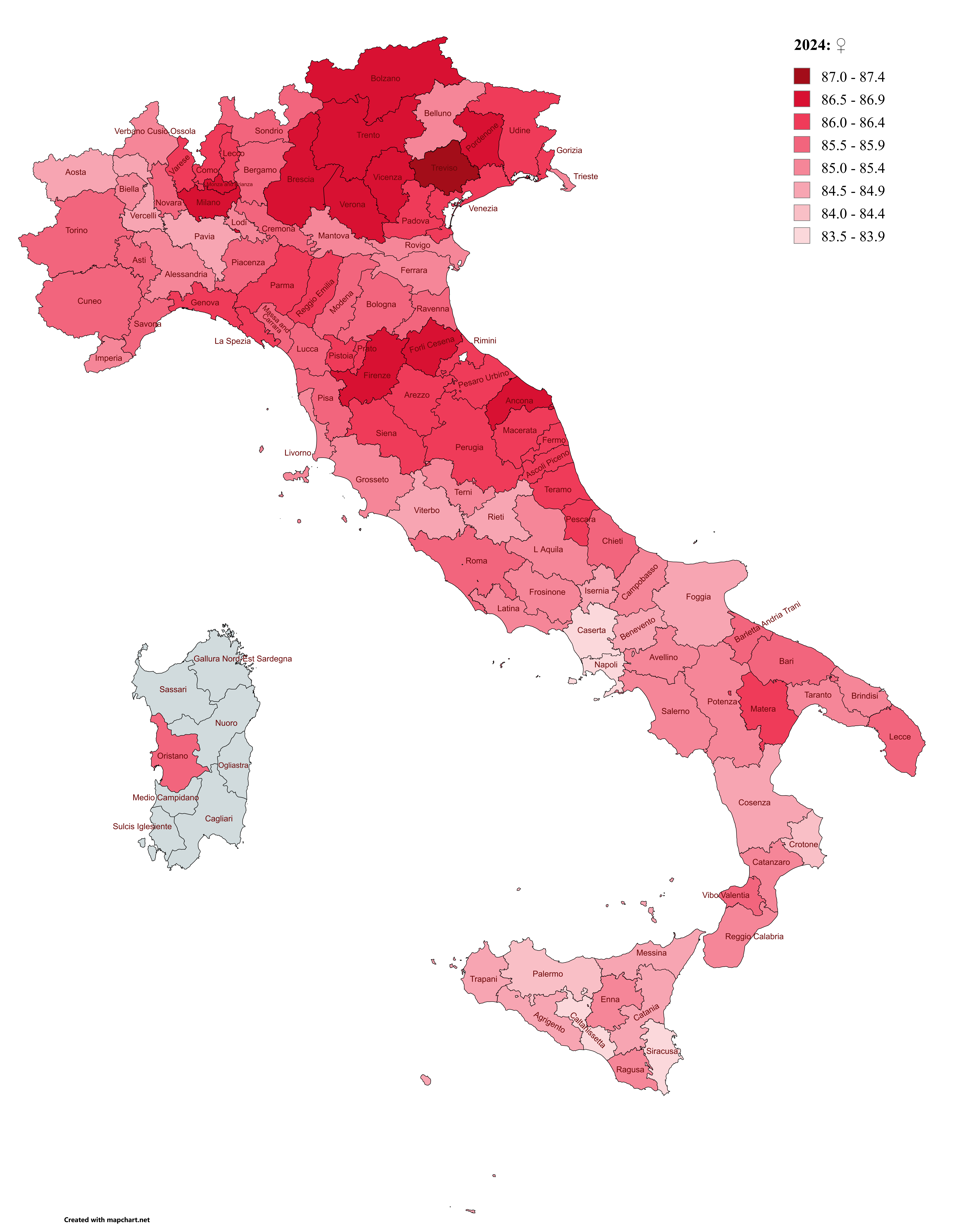
Maps of life expectancy for female

== Eurostat (2014—2023) ==
The division of Italy into territorial units 2 level (NUTS 2) almost coincides with the division of Italy into regions. Except that the administrative rigeon Trentino-Alto Adige is split into two NUTS2-regions: South Tyrol and Trento. By default the table is sorted by 2023.

code	region	2014				2014 →2019	2019				2019 →2023	2023				2014 →2023
code	region	overall	male	female	F Δ M	2014 →2019	overall	male	female	F Δ M	2019 →2023	overall	male	female	F Δ M	2014 →2023
	Italy on average	83.2	80.7	85.6	4.9	0.4	83.6	81.4	85.7	4.3	−0.1	83.5	81.4	85.4	4.0	0.3
ITH2	Trento (Trentino)	84.4	81.7	87.0	5.3	0.5	84.9	82.4	87.2	4.8	0.2	85.1	82.8	87.3	4.5	0.7
ITH1	South Tyrol (Bolzano)	84.0	81.6	86.2	4.6	0.5	84.5	82.2	86.7	4.5	0.5	85.0	82.8	87.0	4.2	1.0
ITI3	Marche	84.0	81.4	86.4	5.0	0.4	84.4	82.3	86.4	4.1	0.1	84.5	82.5	86.3	3.8	0.5
ITH3	Veneto	83.8	81.1	86.3	5.2	0.5	84.3	82.0	86.4	4.4	0.2	84.5	82.3	86.5	4.2	0.7
ITI1	Tuscany	83.8	81.4	86.1	4.7	0.3	84.1	82.0	86.1	4.1	0.3	84.4	82.4	86.2	3.8	0.6
ITC4	Lombardy	83.9	81.3	86.2	4.9	0.3	84.2	81.9	86.4	4.5	0.1	84.3	82.2	86.2	4.0	0.4
ITC2	Aosta Valley	82.9	79.9	85.7	5.8	0.7	83.6	80.7	86.5	5.8	0.6	84.2	82.2	86.0	3.8	1.3
ITI2	Umbria	84.0	81.5	86.4	4.9	0.5	84.5	82.3	86.5	4.2	−0.4	84.1	82.1	86.0	3.9	0.1
ITH5	Emilia-Romagna	83.7	81.3	85.8	4.5	0.3	84.0	81.9	85.9	4.0	0.1	84.1	82.1	86.0	3.9	0.4
ITH4	Friuli-Venezia Giulia	83.4	80.7	85.9	5.2	0.5	83.9	81.6	86.0	4.4	0.2	84.1	81.9	86.1	4.2	0.7
ITC3	Liguria	83.3	80.6	85.7	5.1	0.2	83.5	81.1	85.7	4.6	0.2	83.7	81.5	85.7	4.2	0.4
ITC1	Piedmont	83.2	80.7	85.5	4.8	0.1	83.3	81.0	85.5	4.5	0.1	83.4	81.3	85.4	4.1	0.2
ITF4	Apulia	83.2	80.8	85.4	4.6	0.5	83.7	81.6	85.7	4.1	−0.5	83.2	81.2	85.1	3.9	0.0
ITI4	Lazio	83.1	80.5	85.4	4.9	0.7	83.8	81.6	85.8	4.2	−0.6	83.2	81.1	85.1	4.0	0.1
ITG2	Sardinia	83.2	80.3	85.9	5.6	0.4	83.6	80.7	86.4	5.7	−0.4	83.2	80.5	86.0	5.5	0.0
ITF1	Abruzzo	83.1	80.5	85.6	5.1	0.6	83.7	81.4	85.8	4.4	−0.6	83.1	80.8	85.5	4.7	0.0
ITF5	Basilicata	83.1	80.6	85.6	5.0	−0.1	83.0	80.7	85.2	4.5	−0.1	82.9	80.7	85.1	4.4	−0.2
ITF2	Molise	82.8	79.8	85.9	6.1	0.8	83.6	80.9	86.3	5.4	−0.9	82.7	80.3	85.1	4.8	−0.1
ITF6	Calabria	82.5	79.9	85.0	5.1	0.3	82.8	80.5	85.0	4.5	−0.6	82.2	80.1	84.4	4.3	−0.3
ITG1	Sicily	82.2	79.9	84.3	4.4	0.1	82.3	80.2	84.3	4.1	−0.5	81.8	79.9	83.7	3.8	−0.4
ITF3	Campania	81.5	79.0	83.8	4.8	0.6	82.1	79.9	84.2	4.3	−0.5	81.6	79.5	83.6	4.1	0.1

Data source: Eurostat

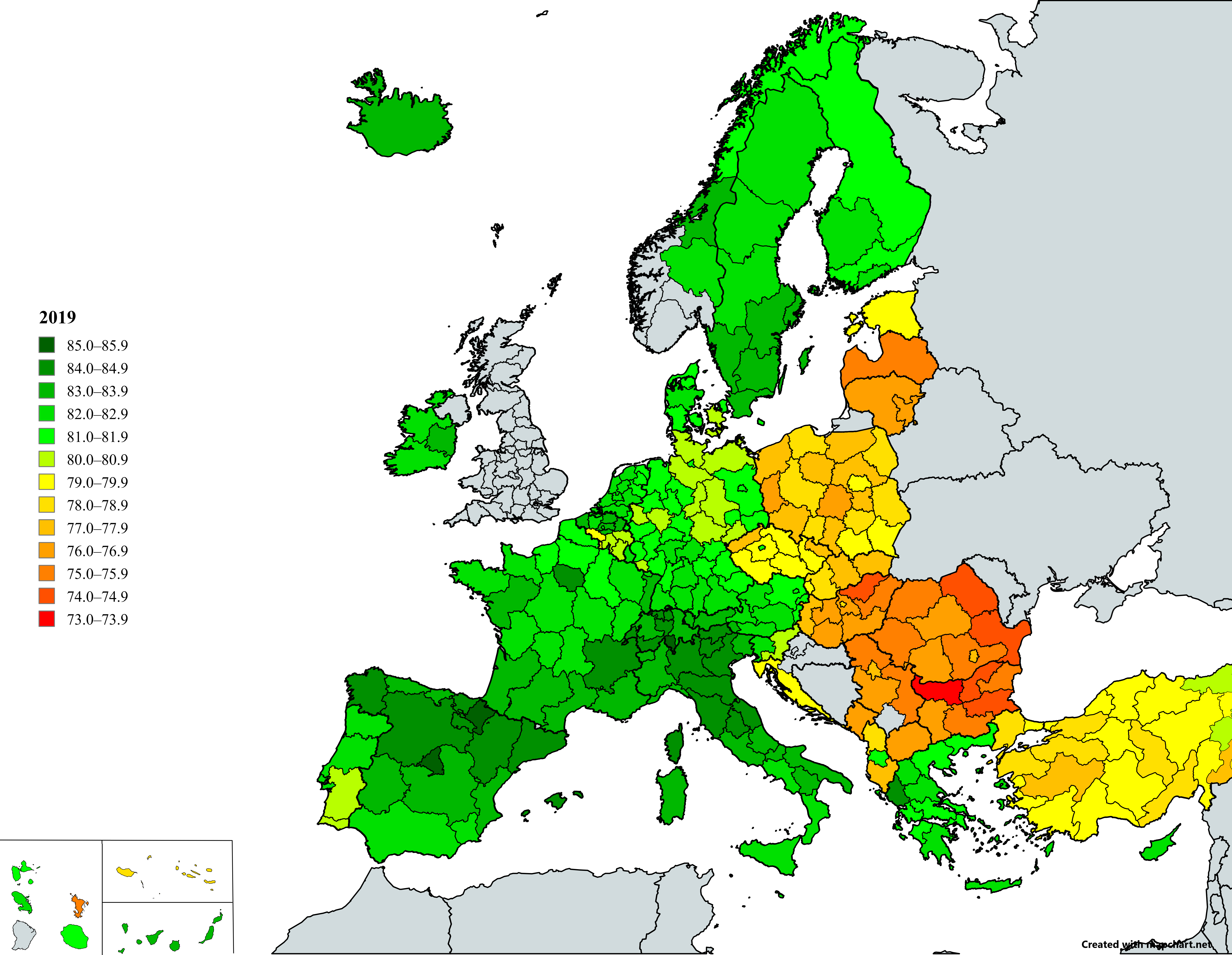
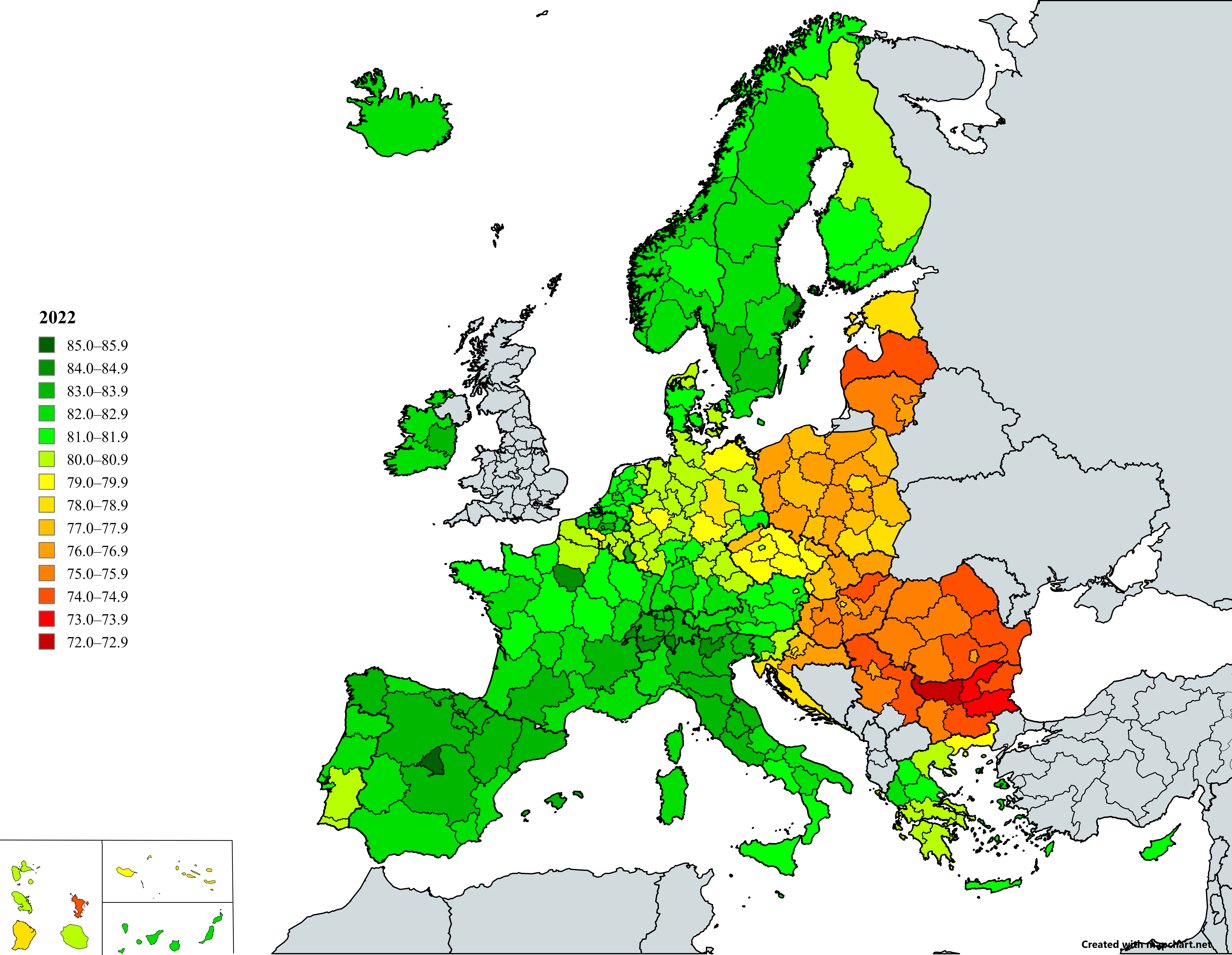
Life expectancy in Italian regions in comparison with regions of other European countries in 2019 and 2022, according to Eurostat
(legends on the maps are identical)

== Global Data Lab (2019–2022) ==
region	2019				2019 →2021	2021	2021 →2022	2022				2019 →2022
region	overall	male	female	F Δ M	2019 →2021	overall	2021 →2022	overall	male	female	F Δ M	2019 →2022
Italy on average	83.55	81.36	85.60	4.24	−0.70	82.85	1.21	84.06	81.97	86.00	4.03	0.51
Trento (Trentino)	84.85	82.40	87.09	4.69	−0.54	84.31	1.38	85.69	83.59	87.62	4.03	0.84
South Tyrol (Bolzano)	84.45	82.20	86.59	4.39	−0.54	83.91	1.07	84.98	82.78	87.01	4.23	0.53
Umbria	84.45	82.30	86.39	4.09	−0.94	83.51	1.27	84.78	82.68	86.81	4.13	0.33
Veneto	84.25	82.00	86.29	4.29	−0.54	83.71	1.07	84.78	82.68	86.81	4.13	0.53
Emilia-Romagna	83.95	81.90	85.80	3.90	−0.64	83.31	1.37	84.68	82.88	86.30	3.42	0.73
Tuscany	84.05	82.00	85.99	3.99	−0.54	83.51	1.17	84.68	82.68	86.50	3.82	0.63
Lombardy	84.15	81.90	86.29	4.39	−0.44	83.71	0.97	84.68	82.58	86.70	4.12	0.53
Marche	84.35	82.30	86.29	3.99	−1.04	83.31	1.37	84.68	82.58	86.60	4.02	0.33
Lazio	83.75	81.60	85.70	4.10	−0.74	83.01	1.47	84.48	82.27	86.40	4.13	0.73
Friuli-Venezia Giulia	83.85	81.60	85.90	4.30	−1.24	82.61	1.76	84.37	82.17	86.50	4.33	0.52
Apulia	83.65	81.60	85.60	4.00	−1.34	82.31	1.76	84.07	81.97	85.89	3.92	0.42
Liguria	83.45	81.10	85.60	4.50	−0.34	83.11	0.96	84.07	81.87	85.99	4.12	0.62
Piedmont	83.25	81.00	85.40	4.40	−0.34	82.91	0.96	83.87	81.77	85.89	4.12	0.62
Abruzzo	83.65	81.40	85.70	4.30	−0.74	82.91	0.96	83.87	81.56	86.20	4.64	0.22
Aosta Valley	83.55	80.70	86.39	5.69	−0.44	83.11	0.55	83.66	81.97	85.28	3.31	0.11
Molise	83.55	80.90	86.19	5.29	−1.84	81.71	1.75	83.46	81.16	85.69	4.53	−0.09
Basilicata	82.95	80.70	85.10	4.40	−0.14	82.81	0.65	83.46	81.16	85.69	4.53	0.51
Sardinia	83.55	80.70	86.29	5.59	−0.44	83.11	0.25	83.36	80.95	85.69	4.74	−0.19
Calabria	82.75	80.50	84.90	4.40	−0.94	81.81	1.24	83.05	80.95	84.98	4.03	0.30
Sicily	82.25	80.20	84.20	4.00	−0.84	81.41	1.34	82.75	80.75	84.57	3.82	0.50
Campania	82.05	79.90	84.10	4.20	−1.04	81.01	1.33	82.34	80.34	84.27	3.93	0.29

Data source: Global Data Lab

== Charts ==
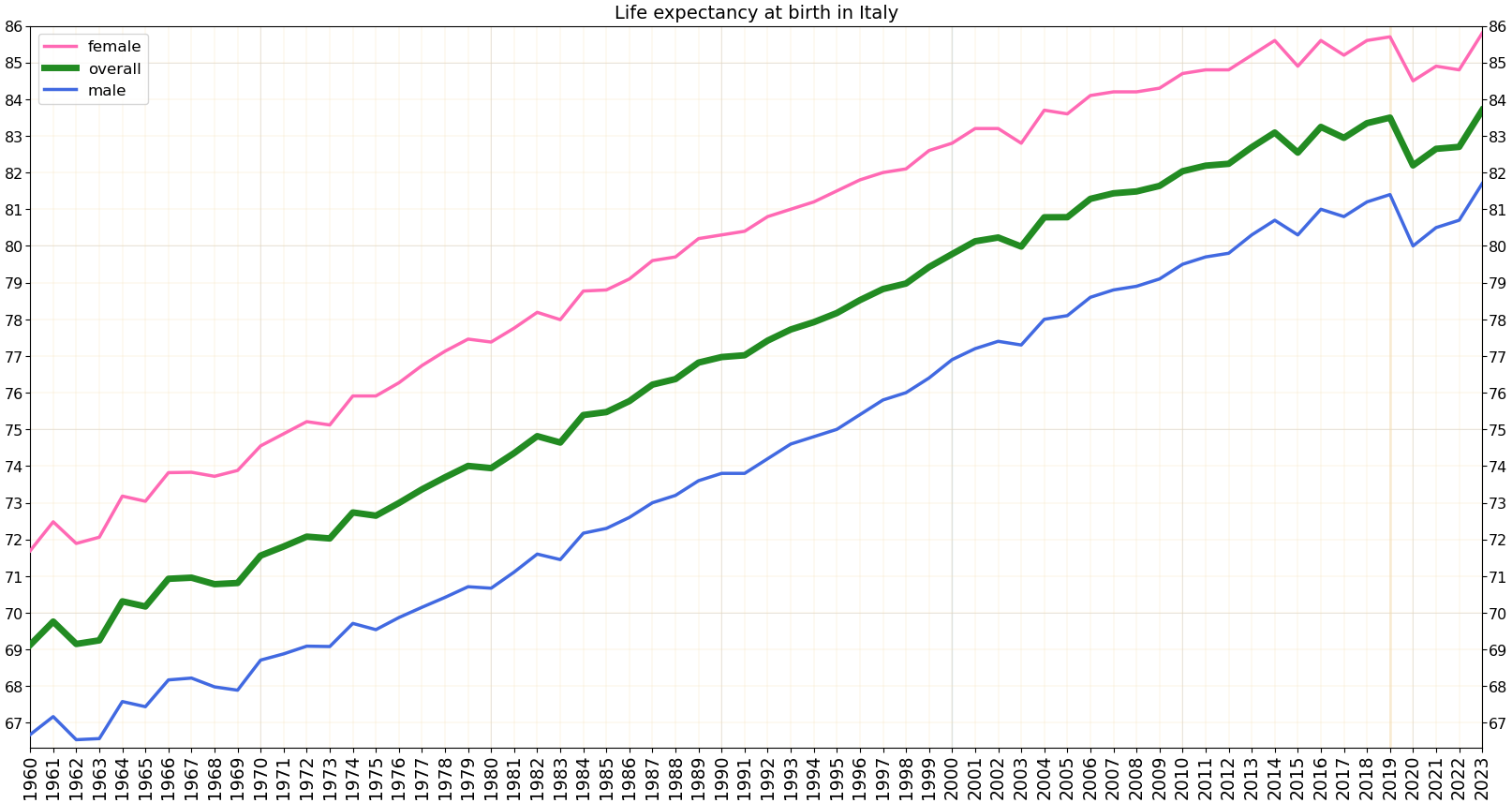
Development of life expectancy in Italy according to estimation of the World Bank Group

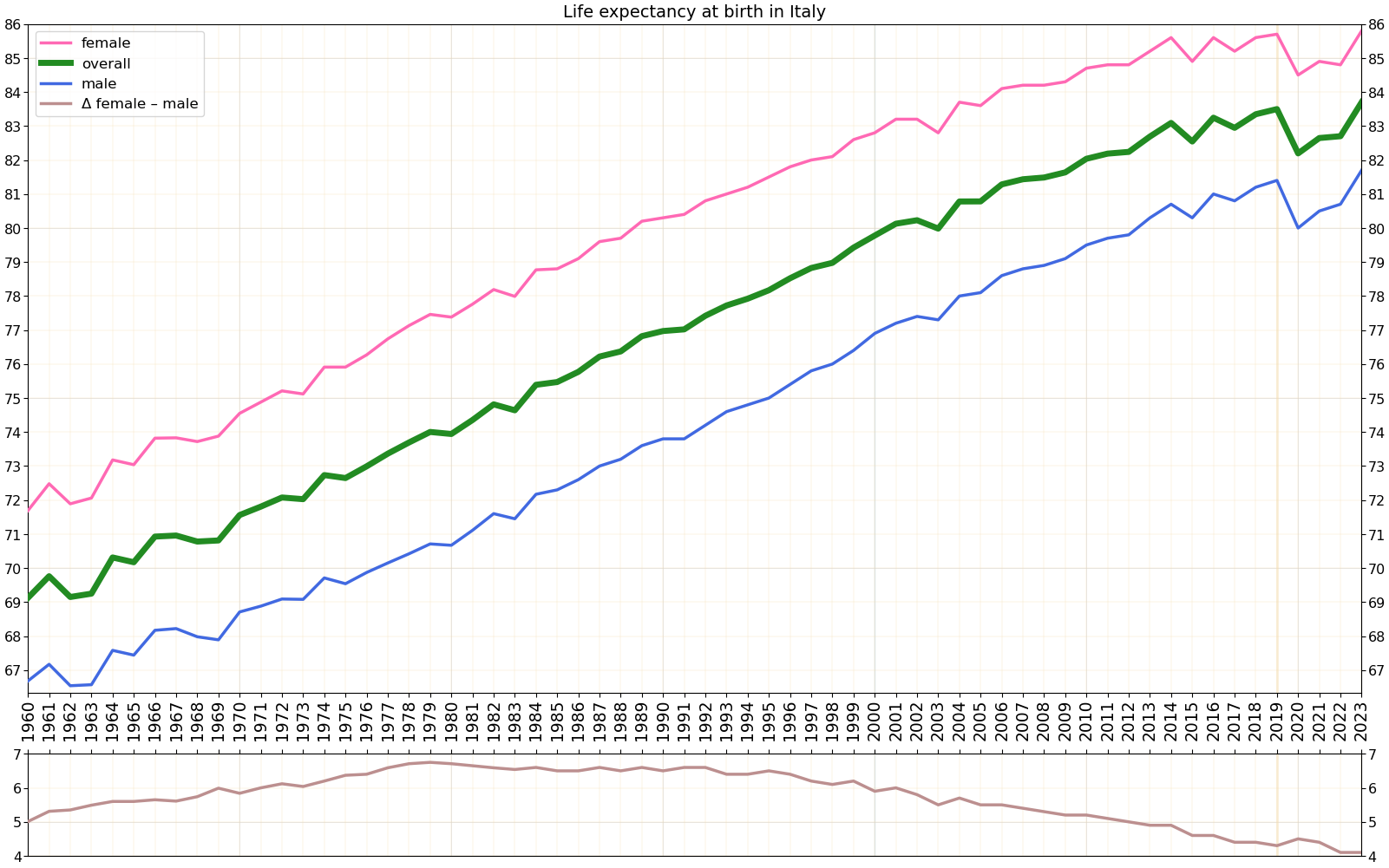
Life expectancy with calculated sex gap

Life expectancy in Italy according to estimation of Our World in Data

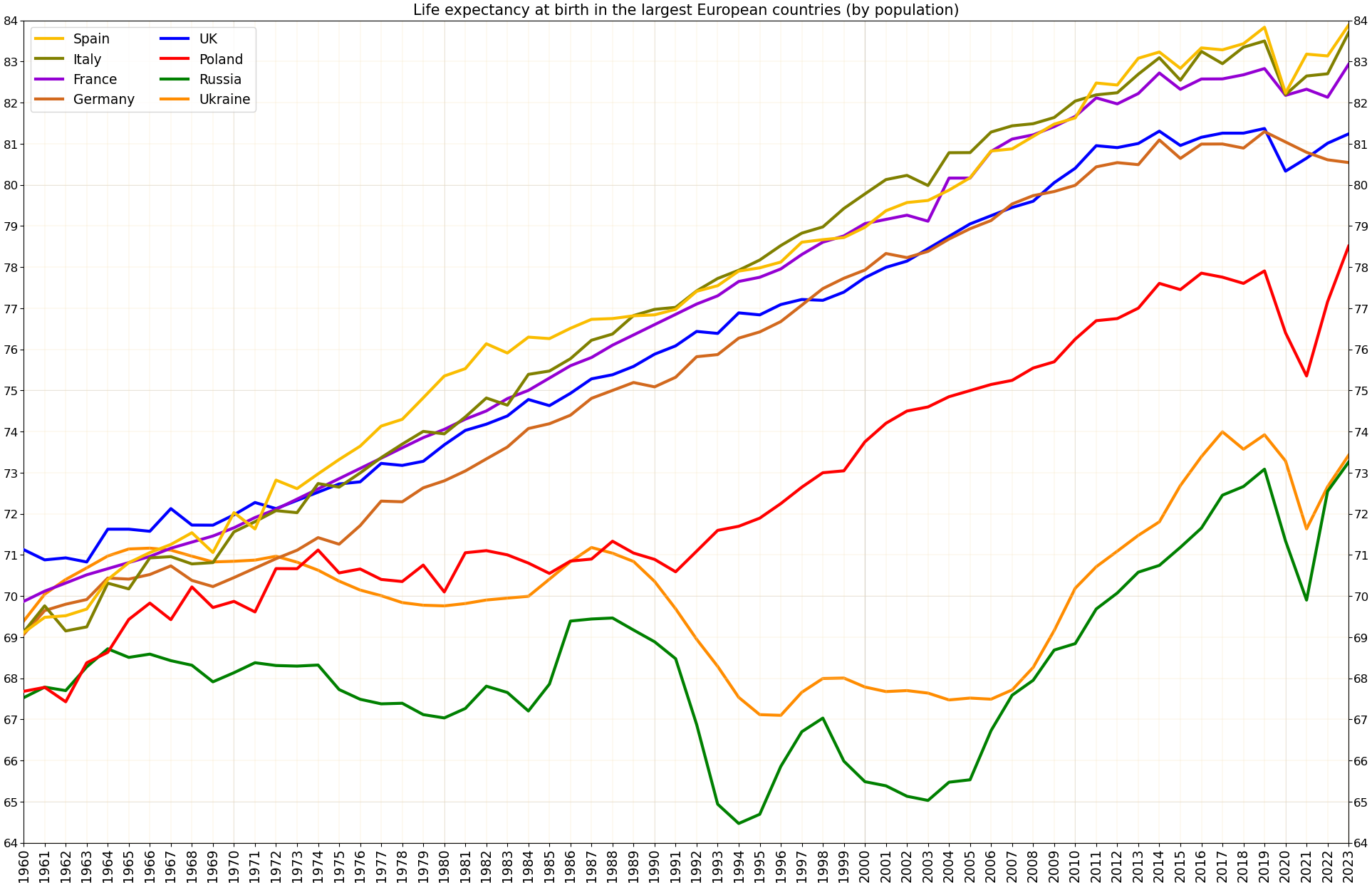
Development of life expectancy in Italy in comparison to the largest by population European countries

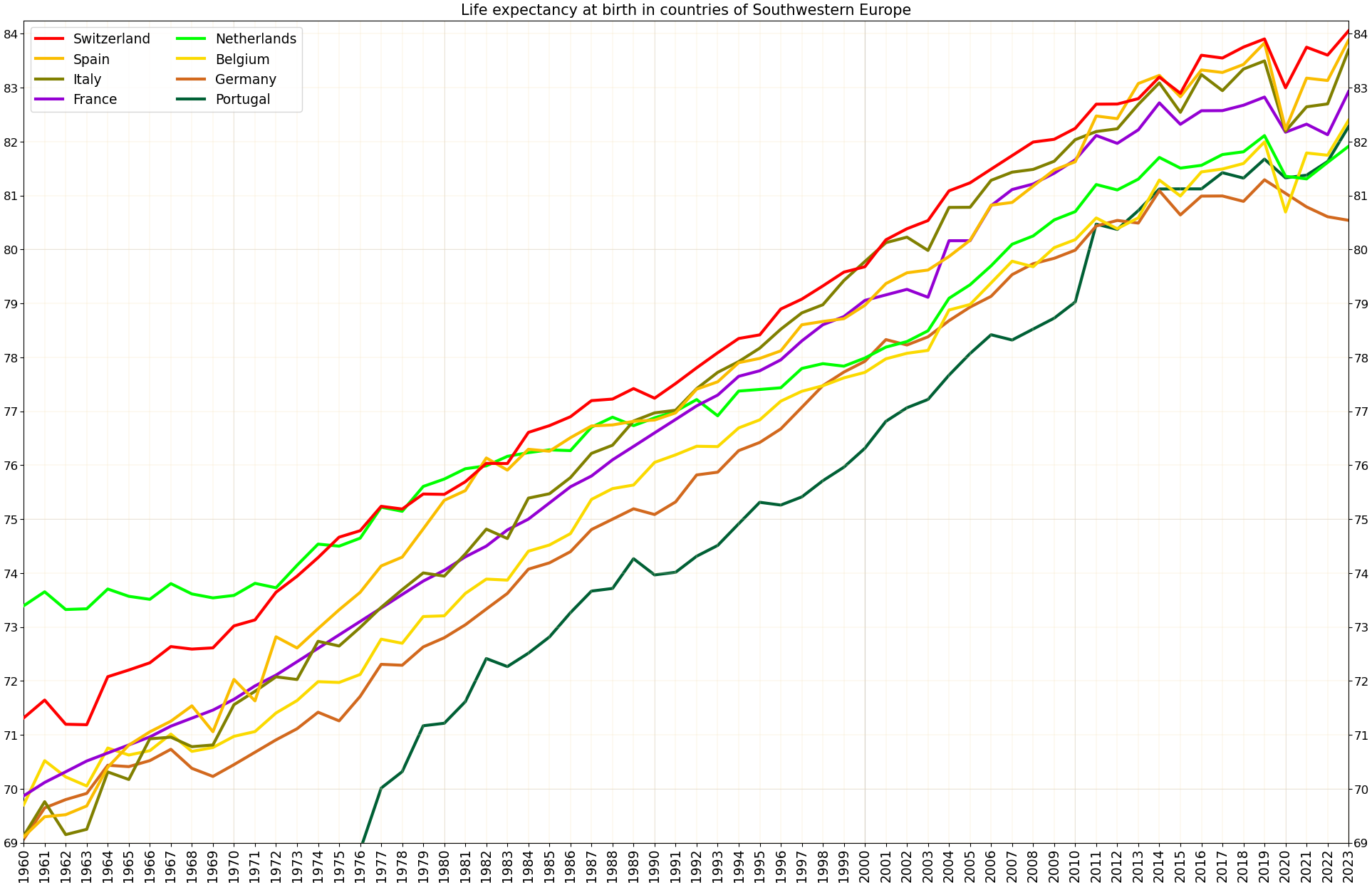
Development of life expectancy in Italy in comparison to countries of Southwestern Europe
Life expectancy and healthy life expectancy in Italy on the background of other countries of the world in 2019

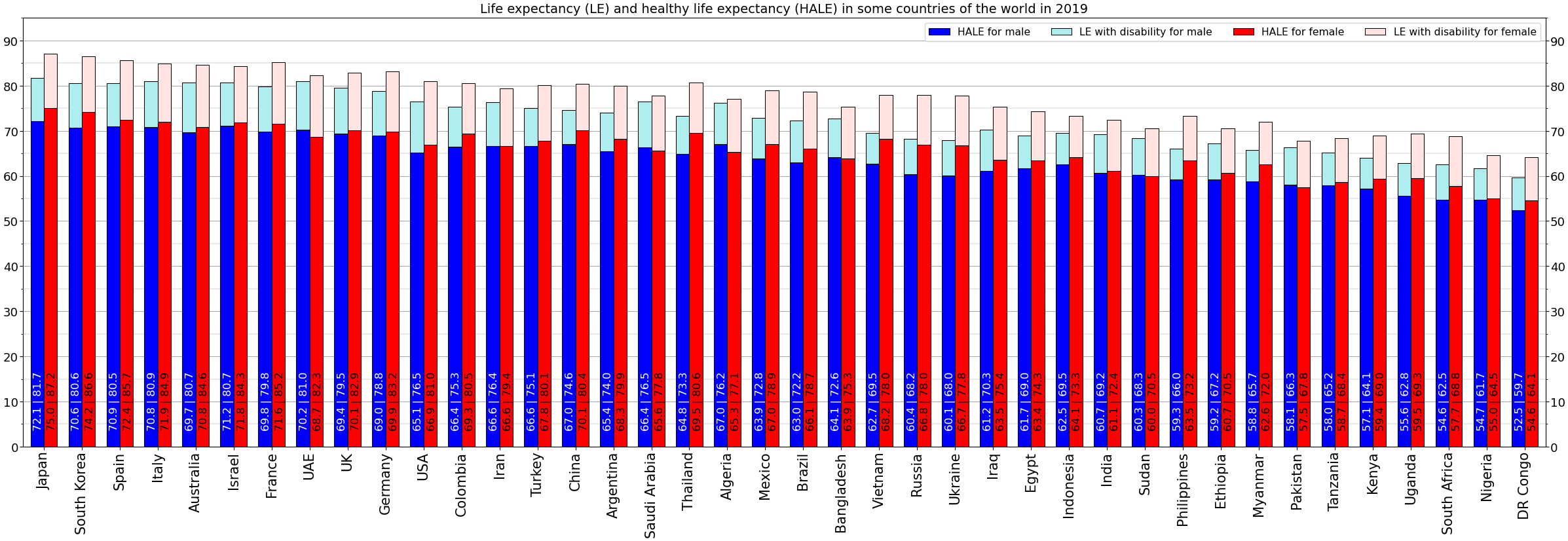
Life expectancy and healthy life expectancy for males and females separately
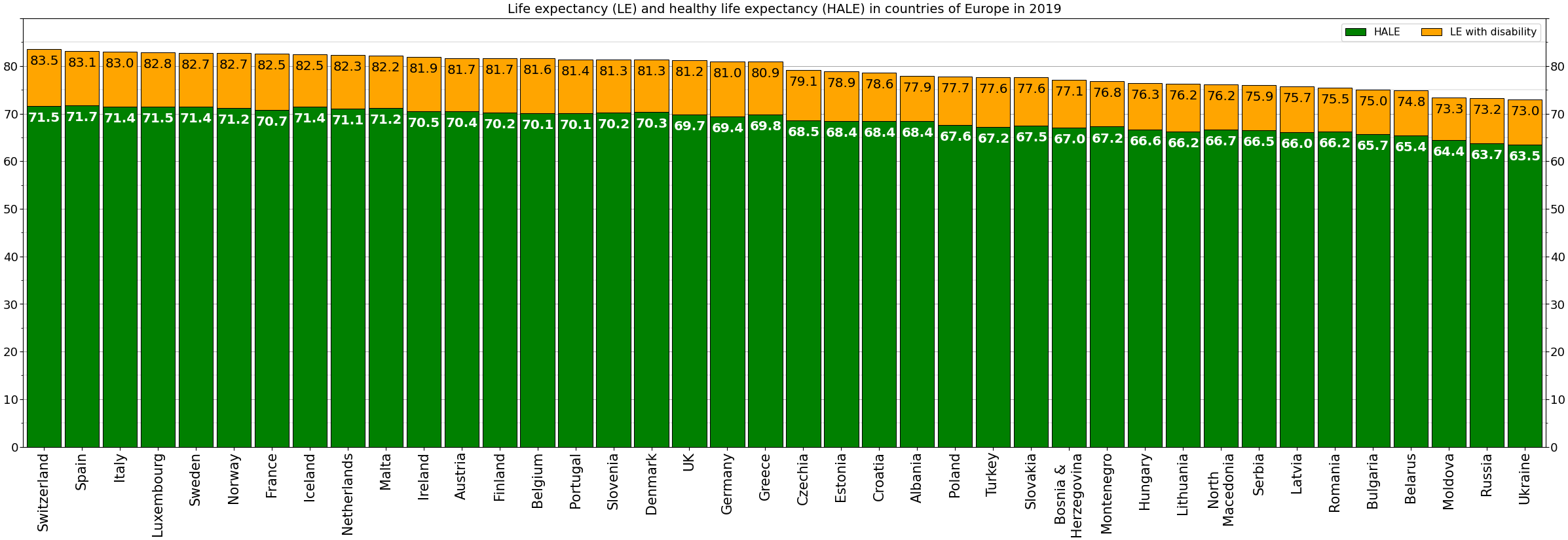
Life expectancy and healthy life expectancy in Italy on the background of other countries of Europe in 2019

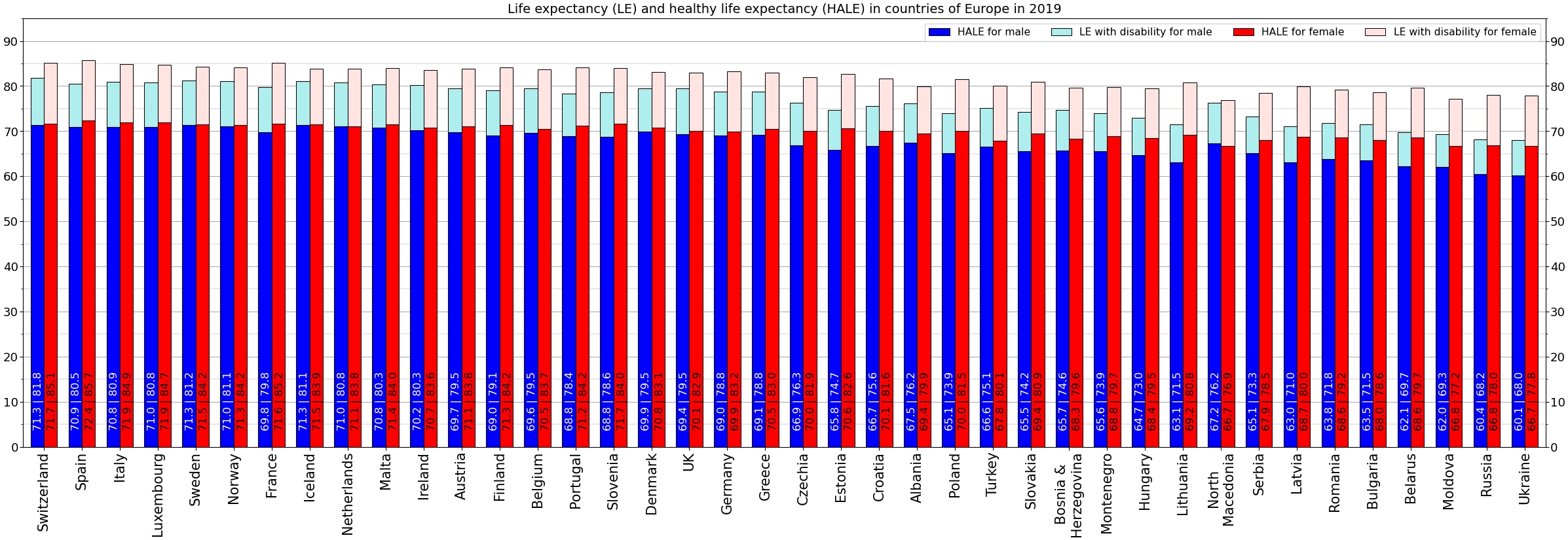
Life expectancy and healthy life expectancy for males and females separately

== See also ==
- List of countries by life expectancy
- List of European countries by life expectancy
- Demographics of Italy
