= Piero Capizzi =

Italian politician (born 1974)

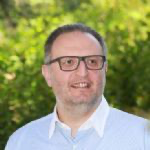

President of the Free Municipal Consortium of Enna
- Incumbent
- Assumed office 28 April 2025
- Preceded by: Office established

Mayor of Calascibetta
- Incumbent
- Assumed office 7 June 2016
- Preceded by: Carmelo Cucci
- In office 17 June 2008 – 11 June 2013
- Preceded by: Giuseppe Lo Vetri
- Succeeded by: Carmelo Cucci

Personal details
- Born: Piero Antonio Santi Capizzi; 1 November 1974 (age 51) Catania, Sicily, Italy
- Party: Democratic Party
- Profession: Lawyer

Piero Antonio Santi Capizzi (born 1 November 1974) is an Italian politician and lawyer who has served as president of the Free Municipal Consortium of Enna since 2025 and as mayor of Calascibetta since 2016.

== Life and career ==
Capizzi was born in Catania, Sicily, in 1974 and works as a lawyer.

He entered local politics in Calascibetta, province of Enna, serving as a municipal councillor from 1998 to 2003 and as a municipal assessor from 2003 to 2005. In the 2008 municipal elections, Capizzi was elected mayor of Calascibetta, serving until June 2013, when he was succeeded by Carmelo Cucci. In 2016, he was re-elected mayor with 1,123 votes (46.71%), heading a coalition including the Democratic Party and civic lists. Capizzi was re-elected for a second consecutive term in 2021.

In April 2025, Capizzi was elected president of the Free Municipal Consortium of Enna, receiving 54,858 weighted votes (58%) against Rosario Colianni, mayor of Nissoria. Capizzi became the first elected president of the reconstituted Enna's provincial body after more than twelve years of administration by regional commissioners.
