= Cataldo Salerno =

Italian politician

President of the Province of Enna
- In office 28 May 2003 – 17 June 2008
- Preceded by: Elio Galvagno
- Succeeded by: Giuseppe Monaco

Personal details
- Born: 1 September 1951 (age 75) Enna, Italy
- Party: Democrats of the Left (2003–2007); Democratic Party (2007–2008)
- Education: University of Catania
- Profession: University professor

Cataldo Salerno (born 1 September 1951) is an Italian politician who served as president of the Province of Enna.

He was born in Enna, Sicily. A graduate in philosophy and (honoris causa) in psychology, Salerno founded the Kore University of Enna, and is the president of the university and the president of the university's foundation.

Salerno was elected president of the Province of Enna in 2003 with the 60% of the votes; he was a candidate of the main Italian centre-left party, Democrats of the Left.
