= Kore University of Enna =

University in Enna, Italy

Coordinates: 37.5537°N 14.2922°E

- Università Kore di Enna
- Latin: Studiorum Universitas Hennae
- Type: State-supported
- Established: 2004
- Affiliations: Compostela Group of Universities
- Rector: Prof. Cataldo Salerno
- Location: Enna, Italy
- Website: www.unikore.it

The Kore University of Enna, in Italian Università Kore di Enna, is a university founded in 2004 in Enna, the capital city of the Province of Enna, in the center of Sicily and has been visited by two Italian Presidents (Oscar Luigi Scalfaro before, and Carlo Azeglio Ciampi for the final inauguration). The university has very modern facilities; it also has a strong relationships with governments and universities of the Mediterranean Sea countries (Malta, Cyprus, Tunisia) and with some of European and U.S. areas. Kore University of Enna has also been accredited with awards in engineering and architecture with technology.

The president of the university and the president of the university foundation is Cataldo Salerno, a Sicilian professor who is also the president of the Province of Enna. The university has laboratories, auditoriums and a conference and concert hall where important musicians play; other Kore facilities include a sports centre and a residential building for students. Kore is planned to be a large campus in the American style with two student houses and many facilities for students. The international relationship of Kore University involves many countries of the Mediterranean Area (Tunisia, Malta, Cyprus, Morocco, etc.) and also American, European and Asian universities. The Kore University of Enna is the newest Sicilian university: in fact, it's the first university founded in Sicily after the unification of Italy, and it was founded 200 years after the foundation of the last Sicilian university, the University of Palermo.
