= List of presidents of the Province of Enna =

President of the Province of Enna
- Presidente della Provincia di Enna; Presidente del Libero consorzio comunale di Enna

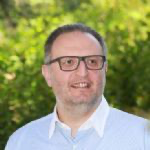
- Incumbent; Piero Capizzi since 28 April 2025
- Inaugural holder: Alessandro D'Ayala
- Formation: 1927

The president of the Province of Enna was the head of the provincial administration of Enna, a local government authority in Sicily, Italy. Since 2025, the chairman of the provincial administration is the president of the Free Municipal Consortium (Libero consorzio comunale).

== List ==
=== Presidents of the Provincial Rectorate (1927–1943) ===
No.	Portrait	Name	Term of office		Party
No.	Portrait	Name	Start	End	Party
1		Alessandro D'Ayala	1927	1937	National Fascist Party
2		Enrico Grimaldi	1937	1941	National Fascist Party

=== Presidents of the Province (1947–2013) ===
Portrait	Name	Term of office		Party
Portrait	Name	Start	End	Party
	?	?	?	?
	Luigi Curcio	1973	1983	Christian Democracy
	Luigi Vetri	?	?	Italian Socialist Party
	Giuseppe Genovese	?	?	Italian Socialist Party
	Eugenio Stefanizzi	14 September 1990	11 February 1992	Italian Socialist Party
	Vincenzo Capizzi	11 February 1992	13 March 1993	Italian Socialist Party
	Pier Francesco Battiato	13 March 1993	21 January 1994	Italian Democratic Socialist Party
	Elio Galvagno	21 January 1994	26 June 1994	Italian People's Party; The Daisy
	Elio Galvagno	26 June 1994	25 May 1998	Italian People's Party; The Daisy
	Elio Galvagno	25 May 1998	28 May 2003	Italian People's Party; The Daisy
	Cataldo Salerno	28 May 2003	21 June 2008	Democrats of the Left; Democratic Party
	Giuseppe Monaco	21 June 2008	18 June 2013	The People of Freedom

=== Regional commissioners (2013–2025) ===
Name	Term of office	
Name	Start	End
Salvatore Caccamo	18 June 2013	31 October 2014
Francesco Riela	31 October 2014	1 December 2014
Antonio Parrinello	1 December 2014	8 April 2015
Francesco Riela	8 April 2015	24 April 2015
Pietro Lo Monaco	24 April 2015	7 January 2016
Angela Scaduto	7 January 2016	29 September 2016
Margherita Rizza	29 September 2016	30 January 2018
Ferdinando Guarino	30 January 2018	31 December 2019
Girolamo Di Fazio	31 December 2019	28 April 2025

=== Presidents of the Free Municipal Consortium (2025–present) ===
No.	Portrait	Name	Term of office		Party
No.	Portrait	Name	Start	End	Party
1		Piero Capizzi	28 April 2025	Incumbent	Democratic Party

== Sources ==
- "Storia amministrativa dell'ente". Ministero dell'Interno.
- Cantaro, Gaetano (6 December 2023). "Gli albori di una nuova Provincia: Enna 1927 - 1940". Enna Magazine. Ufficio Stampa Provincia Regionale di Enna.
