= Nissoria =

Nissoria Nissurìa (Sicilian)
- Comune
- Comune di Nissoria
- View of Nissoria

- Location within Italy Location within Sicily
- Coordinates: 37°39′N 14°27′E
- Country: Italy
- Region: Sicily
- Province: Enna (EN)

Government
  - Mayor: Armando Glorioso

Area
  - Total: 61.83 km^{2} (23.87 sq mi)
- Elevation: 691 m (2,267 ft)

Population (2026)
  - Total: 2,781
  - Density: 44.98/km^{2} (116.5/sq mi)
- Demonym: Nissorini
- Time zone: UTC+1 (CET)
  - Summer (DST): UTC+2 (CEST)
- Postal code: 94010
- Dialing code: 0935
- Patron saint: Saint Joseph
- Website: Official website

Nissoria (Sicilian: Nissurìa) is a town and comune (municipality) in the Province of Enna in the autonomous island region of Sicily in Italy, located about 18 kilometres (11 mi) northeast of Enna and 110 kilometres (68 mi) southeast of Palermo. It has 2,781 inhabitants.

Nissoria borders the municipalities of Agira, Assoro, Gagliano Castelferrato, Leonforte, and Nicosia.

== Demographics ==
As of 2026, the population is 2,781, of which 50.4% are males, and 49.6% are females. Minors make up 14.1% of the population, and seniors make up 23.2%.

Historical population

Year	Pop.	±%
1861	2,555	—
1871	2,665	+4.3%
1881	2,957	+11.0%
1901	3,406	+15.2%
1911	2,821	−17.2%
1921	3,019	+7.0%
1931	3,121	+3.4%
1936	2,776	−11.1%

Year	Pop.	±%
1951	3,438	+23.8%
1961	3,115	−9.4%
1971	3,032	−2.7%
1981	3,296	+8.7%
1991	3,152	−4.4%
2001	3,014	−4.4%
2011	2,969	−1.5%
2021	2,861	−3.6%

Source: ISTAT

=== Immigration ===
As of 2025, immigrants make up 5.4% of the population. The 5 largest foreign countries of birth are Germany, Romania, Switzerland, Argentina, and Australia.
