= Province of Enna =

Province of Italy

Coordinates: 37°34′N 14°16′E

Province of Enna Provincia di Enna (Italian) Pruvincia di Enna (Sicilian)
- Province
- Free Municipal Consortium of Enna; Libero consorzio comunale di Enna (Italian)
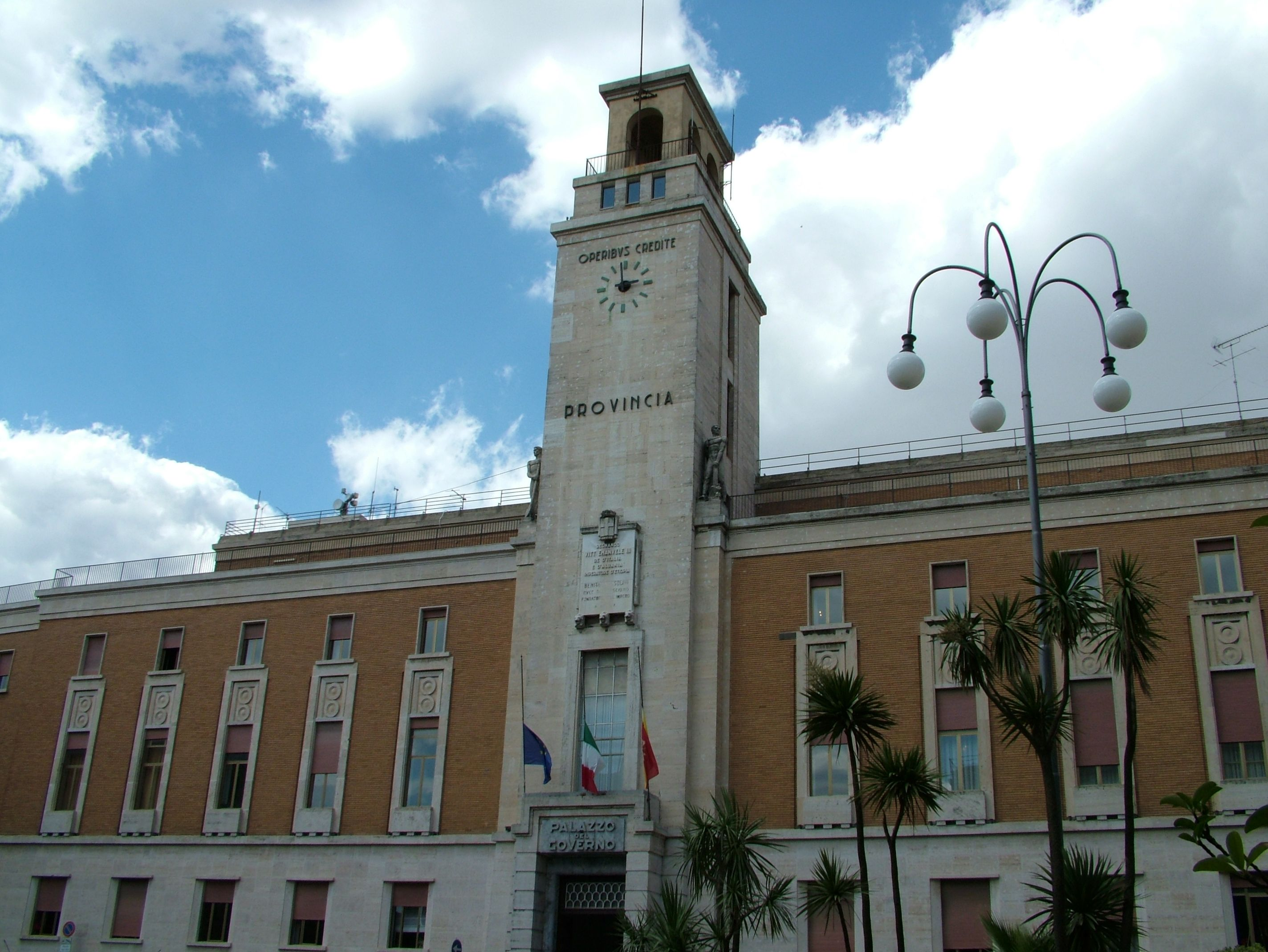
- Palazzo del Governo, the provincial seat

- Coat of arms

- Location of the province of Enna in Italy
- Country: Italy
- Region: Sicily
- Capital(s): Enna
- Municipalities: 20

Government
  - President: Piero Capizzi

Area
  - Total: 2,574.70 km^{2} (994.10 sq mi)

Population (2026)
  - Total: 151,525
  - Density: 58.8515/km^{2} (152.425/sq mi)

GDP
  - Total: €2.608 billion (2015)
  - Per capita: €15,297 (2015)
- Time zone: UTC+1 (CET)
  - Summer (DST): UTC+2 (CEST)
- Postal code: 94000-94100
- Telephone prefix: 0935, 0934
- Vehicle registration: EN
- ISTAT code: 086

The province of Enna (Italian: provincia di Enna; Sicilian: pruvincia di Enna; officially libero consorzio comunale di Enna) is a province in the autonomous island region of Sicily in Italy.

It was created in 1927, out of parts of the provinces of Caltanisetta and Catania. The capital was designated as Enna (then called Castrogiovanni), instead of Piazza Armerina, due to the influence of politician Napoleone Colajanni. Following the suppression of the Sicilian provinces, it was replaced in 2015 by the free municipal consortium of Enna (Italian: libero consorzio comunale di Enna). Its capital is the city of Enna, located on a mountain and the highest provincial capital in Sicily. Located in the center of the island, it is the only landlocked province in Sicily.

It has a population of 151,525 in an area of 2,574.70 square kilometres (994.10 mi^{2}) across its 20 municipalities.

== Municipalities ==
The province has 20 municipalities:

- Agira
- Aidone
- Assoro
- Barrafranca
- Calascibetta
- Catenanuova
- Centuripe
- Cerami
- Enna
- Gagliano Castelferrato
- Leonforte
- Nicosia, Sicily
- Nissoria
- Piazza Armerina
- Pietraperzia
- Regalbuto
- Sperlinga
- Troina
- Valguarnera Caropepe
- Villarosa

== Demographics ==
As of 2026, the population is 151,525, of which 48.7% are male, and 51.3% are female. Minors make up 14.1% of the population, and seniors make up 26.4%.

Historical population

Year	Pop.	±%
1861	164,517	—
1871	163,641	−0.5%
1881	189,106	+15.6%
1901	231,794	+22.6%
1911	253,618	+9.4%
1921	272,671	+7.5%
1931	225,696	−17.2%
1936	218,294	−3.3%

Year	Pop.	±%
1951	242,675	+11.2%
1961	229,126	−5.6%
1971	202,131	−11.8%
1981	190,939	−5.5%
1991	186,182	−2.5%
2001	177,200	−4.8%
2011	173,451	−2.1%
2021	156,730	−9.6%

Source: ISTAT

=== Immigration ===
As of 2025, immigrants make up 6.4% of the total population. The 5 largest foreign countries of birth are Germany, Romania, Switzerland, Belgium, and Argentina.

== Main sites ==
- Villa Romana del Casale, in Piazza Armerina, a huge ancient Roman "villa", where there are many well preserved Roman mosaics, the most important mosaic system in the Roman world of that time;
- Morgantina, an ancient town that constitutes the most important archeological area in Central Sicily, whose finds are located in many big museums all over the world: Malibu, Los Angeles, California; New York; Musée du Louvre, Paris; and the Archeological Museum of Aidone, the commune in which Morgantina is located.
- Castello di Lombardia, in Enna, the biggest castle of Sicily: it had 20 towers centuries ago, but now it has 6 towers, and among these there is Torre Pisana, a very big tower affording an extensive panoramic vista of the surrounding countryside;
- Duomo of Enna, a cathedral built in the 13th century;
- Museo Alessi in Enna, a museum which hosts the exhibitions of the Treseaure of Enna's Our Lady and her crown, made with gold.
- The Cathedral of Piazza Armerina, characterized by a huge green dome.
- Lake Pergusa, in Enna: it has a forest inside a wildlife reserve, where thousands of rare birds can be found.
- The Autodromo di Pergusa, the most important racing circuit of southern Italy: it hosted and still hosts international competitions, such as Formula One, Formula 3000, and the Ferrari Party and other events

=== Events ===
In Enna, for Good Friday, there is a procession, and on 2 July is held the Enna's Our Lady feast; Piazza Armerina, on 11, 12 and 13 August, is seat of the Palio dei Normanni, an ancient and traditional feast whose protagonists are the horses.

== See also ==
- Sulfur mining in Sicily
