= List of marquesses in the peerages of Britain and Ireland =

Peerages and baronetcies of Britain and Ireland
Extant	All
Dukes	Dukedoms
Marquesses	Marquessates
Earls	Earldoms
Viscounts	Viscountcies
Barons	Baronies
Baronets	Baronetcies

This is a list of the 34 present and extant marquesses in the peerages of the Kingdom of England, Kingdom of Scotland, Kingdom of Great Britain, Kingdom of Ireland, and the United Kingdom of Great Britain and Ireland which became the United Kingdom of Great Britain and Northern Ireland in 1922. It does not mention any Marquessates held as a subsidiary title of a Duke. For a more complete listing, which adds these "hidden" Marquessates as well as extant, extinct, dormant, abeyant, and forfeit ones, see List of marquessates in the peerages of Britain and Ireland.

They were a relatively late introduction to the British peerage, and on the evening of the Coronation of Queen Victoria in 1838, the Prime Minister Lord Melbourne explained to her why (from her journals):

"I spoke to Ld M. about the numbers of Peers present at the Coronation, & he said it was quite unprecedented. I observed that there were very few Viscounts, to which he replied "There are very few Viscounts," that they were an odd sort of title & not really English; that they came from Vice-Comites; that Dukes & Barons were the only real English titles; — that Marquises were likewise not English, & that people were mere made Marquises, when it was not wished that they should be made Dukes".

== Order of precedence ==
Heraldic representation of the Coronet of a British Marquess.

The general order of precedence among Marquesses is:

1. Marquesses in the Peerage of England
2. Marquesses in the Peerage of Scotland
3. Marquesses in the Peerage of Great Britain
4. Marquesses in the Peerage of Ireland created before 1801
5. Marquesses in the Peerage of the United Kingdom and Marquesses in the Peerage of Ireland created after 1801

== Marquesses in the Peerages of Britain and Ireland ==
#	Title	Creation	Peerage	Current holder			Heir Apparent Presumptive
#	Title	Creation	Peerage	Marquess	Age	Accession	Heir Apparent Presumptive
1	Marquess of Winchester	1551	England	Christopher Paulet, 19th Marquess of Winchester	57	2016	Michael Paulet, Earl of Wiltshire (b. 1999)
2	Marquess of Huntly	1599	Scotland	Granville Gordon, 13th Marquess of Huntly	82	1987	Alastair Gordon, Earl of Aboyne (b. 1973)
3	Marquess of Queensberry	1682	Scotland	Sholto Douglas, 13th Marquess of Queensberry	59	2026	Torquil Oberon Tobias Douglas (brother) (b. 1978)
4	Marquess of Tweeddale	1694	Scotland	Charles Hay, 14th Marquess of Tweeddale	79	2005	Alistair Hay (brother) (b. 1955)
5	Marquess of Lothian	1701	Scotland	Ralph Kerr, 14th Marquess of Lothian	68	2024	John Kerr, Earl of Ancram (b. 1988)
6	Marquess of Lansdowne	1784	Great Britain	Charles Petty-Fitzmaurice, 9th Marquess of Lansdowne	85	1999	Simon Petty-FitzMaurice, Earl of Kerry (b. 1970)
7	Marquess Townshend	1787	Great Britain	Thomas Townshend, 9th Marquess Townshend	48	2025	Rafe Thomas Townshend, Viscount Raynham (b. 2014)
8	Marquess of Salisbury	1789	Great Britain	Robert Gascoyne-Cecil, 7th Marquess of Salisbury	80	2003	Robert Edward William Gascoyne-Cecil, Viscount Cranborne (b. 1970)
9	Marquess of Bath	1789	Great Britain	Ceawlin Thynn, 8th Marquess of Bath	52	2020	John Thynn, Viscount Weymouth (b. 2014)
10	Marquess of Hertford	1793	Great Britain	Henry Seymour, 9th Marquess of Hertford	68	1997	William Seymour, Earl of Yarmouth (b. 2013)
11	Marquess of Bute	1796	Great Britain	John Bryson Crichton-Stuart, 8th Marquess of Bute	36	2021	John, Earl of Dumfries (b. 2024)
12	Marquess of Waterford	1789	Ireland	Henry Beresford, 9th Marquess of Waterford	68	2015	Richard de la Poer Beresford, Earl of Tyrone (b. 1987)
13	Marquess of Downshire	1789	Ireland	Nicholas Hill, 9th Marquess of Downshire	67	2003	Edmund Hill, Earl of Hillsborough (b. 1996)
14	Marquess of Donegall	1791	Ireland	Patrick Chichester, 8th Marquess of Donegall	74	2007	James Chichester, Earl of Belfast (b. 1990)
15	Marquess of Headfort	1800	Ireland	Christopher Taylour, 7th Marquess of Headfort	67	2005	Thomas Taylour, Earl of Bective (b. 1989)
16	Marquess of Sligo	1800	Ireland	Sebastian Browne, 12th Marquess of Sligo	62	2014	Christopher Browne, Earl of Altamont (b. 1988)
17	Marquess of Ely	1800	Ireland	John Tottenham, 9th Marquess of Ely	83	2006	Timothy Tottenham (brother) (b. 1948)
18	Marquess of Exeter	1801	United Kingdom	Michael Cecil, 8th Marquess of Exeter	91	1988	Anthony Cecil, Lord Burghley (b. 1970)
19	Marquess of Northampton	1812	United Kingdom	Spencer Compton, 7th Marquess of Northampton	80	1978	Daniel Compton, Earl Compton (b. 1973)
20	Marquess Camden	1812	United Kingdom	David Pratt, 6th Marquess Camden	96	1983	James Pratt, Earl of Brecknock (b. 1965)
21	Marquess of Anglesey	1815	United Kingdom	Charles Paget, 8th Marquess of Anglesey	75	2013	Benedict Paget, Earl of Uxbridge (b. 1986)
22	Marquess of Cholmondeley	1815	United Kingdom	David Cholmondeley, 7th Marquess of Cholmondeley	66	1990	Alexander Cholmondeley, Earl of Rocksavage (b. 2009)
23	Marquess of Londonderry	1816 (Note: The Marquess of Londonderry was created after the Acts of Union 1800. It takes precedence after earlier Marquessates of the United Kingdom.)	Ireland	Frederick Aubrey Vane-Tempest-Stewart, 10th Marquess of Londonderry	54	2012	Reginald Vane-Tempest-Stuart (brother) (b. 1977)
24	Marquess Conyngham	1816 (Note: The Marquess of Conyngham was created after the Acts of Union 1800. It takes precedence after earlier Marquessates of the United Kingdom.)	Ireland	Alexander Conyngham, 9th Marquess Conyngham	51	2025	Rory Conyngham, Earl of Mount Charles (b. 2010)
25	Marquess of Ailesbury	1821	United Kingdom	David Brudenell-Bruce, 9th Marquess of Ailesbury	73	2024	Thomas Brudenell-Bruce, Earl of Cardigan (b. 1982)
26	Marquess of Bristol	1826	United Kingdom	Frederick Hervey, 8th Marquess of Bristol	47	1999	Frederick Hervey, Earl Jermyn (b. 2022)
27	Marquess of Ailsa	1831	United Kingdom	David Kennedy, 9th Marquess of Ailsa	68	2015	Archibald Kennedy, Earl of Cassillis (b. 1995)
28	Marquess of Normanby	1838	United Kingdom	Constantine Phipps, 5th Marquess of Normanby	72	1994	John Phipps, Earl of Mulgrave (b. 1994)
29	Marquess of Abergavenny	1876	United Kingdom	Christopher Nevill, 6th Marquess of Abergavenny	71	2000	None; Guy Michael Rossmore Nevill (fourth cousin) (b. 1973) is heir presumptive to the Earldom of Abergavenny
30	Marquess of Zetland	1892	United Kingdom	Robin Dundas, 5th Marquess of Zetland	60–61	2026	James Edward Dundas (brother) (b. 1967)
31	Marquess of Linlithgow	1902	United Kingdom	Adrian Hope, 4th Marquess of Linlithgow	80	1987	Andrew Hope, Earl of Hopetoun (b. 1969)
32	Marquess of Aberdeen and Temair	1916	United Kingdom	George Gordon, 8th Marquess of Aberdeen and Temair	43	2020	Ivo Gordon, Earl of Haddo (b. 2012)
33	Marquess of Milford Haven	1917	United Kingdom	George Mountbatten, 4th Marquess of Milford Haven	65	1970	Henry Mountbatten, Earl of Medina (b. 1991)
34	Marquess of Reading	1926	United Kingdom	Julian Isaacs, 5th Marquess of Reading	40	2026	Antony Isaacs (uncle) (b. 1943)

== See also ==
- British nobility
- Marquesses in the United Kingdom
- List of marquessates in the peerages of Britain and Ireland
