= Marjorie Pratt, Countess of Brecknock =

British aristocrat, courtier and socialite

Marjorie, Countess of Brecknock DBE JP
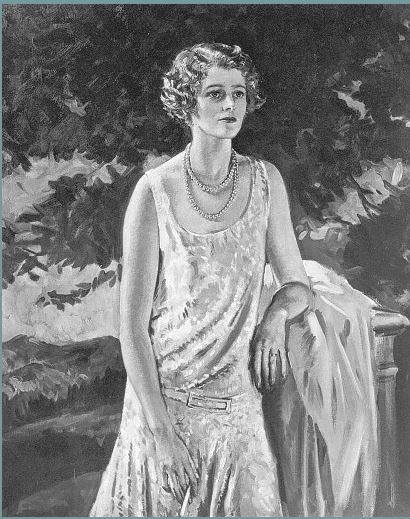
- Countess of Brecknock by William Bruce Ellis Ranken
- Born: Marjorie Minna Amelia Jenkins; 24 February 1900; Mayfair, London
- Died: 24 August 1989 (aged 89); Andover, Hampshire
- Spouse: John Pratt, Earl of Brecknock (m. 1920; div. 1941)
- Children: 2

Marjorie, Countess of Brecknock (born Marjorie Minna Jenkins Amelia Jenkins; 28 March 1900 – 24 August 1989) was a British aristocrat, courtier and socialite.

== Early life ==
Brecknock was born at 48 Grosvenor Square, Mayfair, the only child of Colonel Atherton Edward Jenkins and his wife, Anna Isabella (née Schoenbrunn), the niece of Sir Ernest Cassel. She was a second cousin (and life-long close friend) of Edwina Ashley, who married Lord Louis Mountbatten, 1st Earl Mountbatten of Burma.

== Family ==
She married John, Earl of Brecknock, eldest son of John Pratt, 4th Marquess Camden, and his wife, the former Lady Joan Marion Nevill, on 19 October 1920 in St Margaret's Church, Westminster, London. They had at least two children:

- Lady Mary Clementine Pratt (1921–2002)
- David George Edward Henry Pratt, 6th Marquess Camden (born 1930)

The Earl and Countess of Brecknock divorced in 1941.

== Career ==
She was Lady-in-Waiting to Princess Marina, Duchess of Kent, and Superintendent-in-Charge, St. John's Ambulance Brigade.

== Honours ==
- United Kingdom:
  - 2 June 1967: Dame Commander (DBE) of the Order of the British Empire.
  - 28 January 1971: Dame Grand Cross (GCStJ) of the Most Venerable Order of the Hospital of Saint John of Jerusalem.
