= Sant'Antonio Abate, Cerami =

Church building in Cerami, Italy

Coordinates: 37°48′36″N 14°30′36″E

Sant'Antonio Abate is a Baroque-style Roman Catholic church in the town of Cerami, in the province of Enna, region of Sicily, Italy.

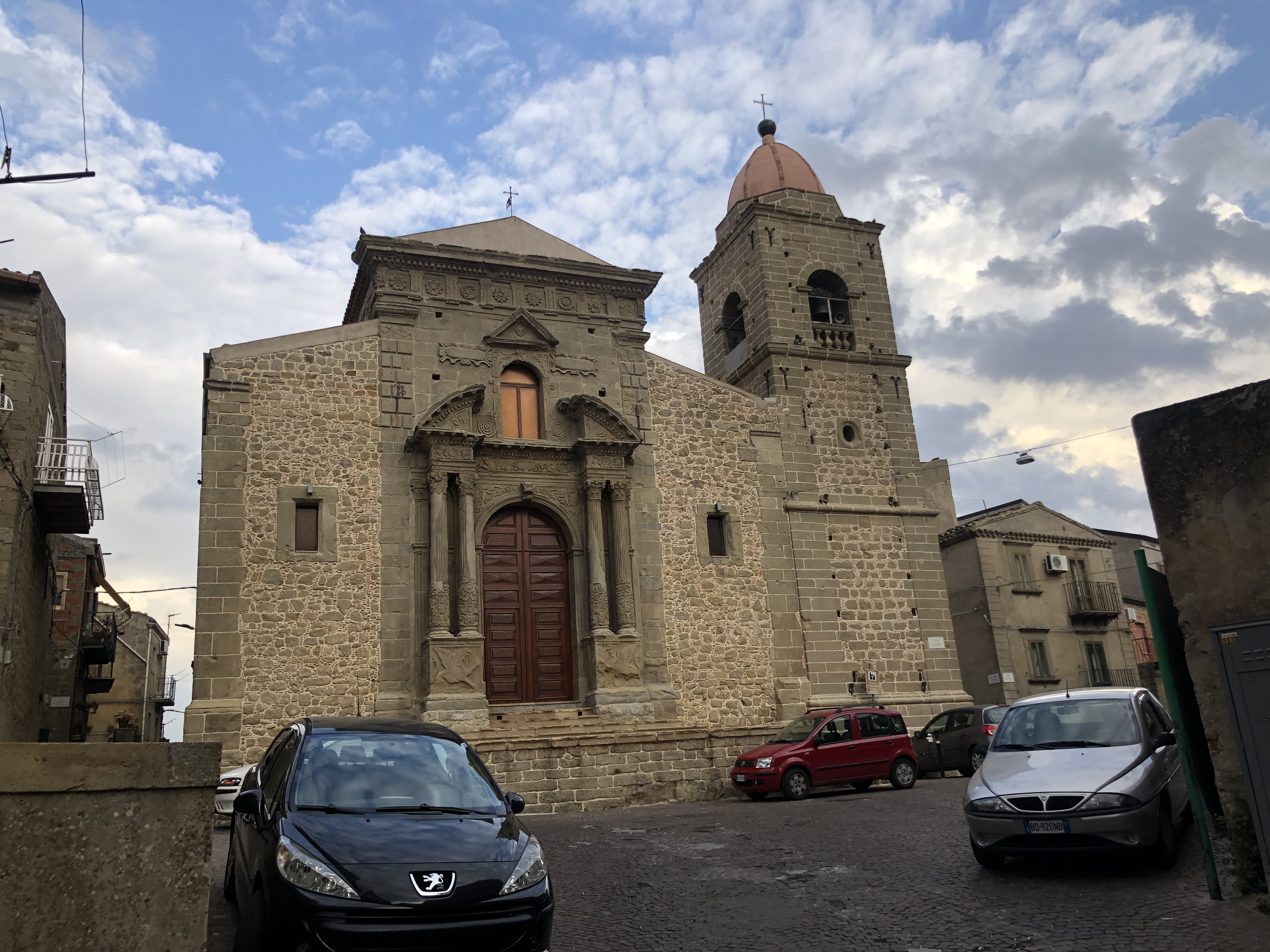
Church facade and bell-tower

== History and description ==
A church we see today was apparently erected in circa 1623, but likely at the location of an older church that had been erected in the early 16th century under the patronage of the feudal owner of the town, the Baron Vincenzo Gerolamo Rosso. In 1600, the confraternity of San’Antonio Abate was founded, and still remains attached to this church. In 1774, a bid for the interior stucco decoration was awarded to Giuseppe Sciacchitano of Capizzi. In 1854, a new bell tower was designed and built by Ambrogio Castellana. The facade has a protruding portico with a broken tympanum and a horizontal frieze along the second story with floral decorations.

The interior has a central nave and two aisles separated by columns and pilasters. The choir and organ from the apse have been removed, and the paintings of the Madonna of the Sorrows and St John the Evangelist (2013) in the apse are modern, and part of a triptych of the Crucifixion by Cesare di Narda. Two 18th-century frescoes in the apse depict the Meeting St Anthony Abbott and St Paul of Thebes and a St Anthony in the desert.

The left nave has a presbytery altar to Jesus the Good Shepherd with a small 18th-century wooden icon. Above the niche is a pelican, a symbol of the sacrifice of the eucharist. A bas relief in stucco depicts Moses and the mannah of the heavens. There is also a 16th-century icon of St Vito Martire.

The right nave has a wooden statue of St Anthony Abbot (1946) signed by Giuseppe Stufflesser.

On the walls of the nave are five canvases depicting Madonna of Sorrows, Rest on the way to Egypt; Immaculate Conception; Crucifixion, and a Noli me Tangere. A painting of the Souls of Purgatory was lost in the 1920s. The church houses a processional fercolo, a copy of the original which was attributed to the Li Volsi family of sculptors.
