= Lord Michael Pratt =

Lord Michael John Henry Pratt (15 August 1946 – 3 September 2007) was a scion of the British aristocracy. An eccentric, he is best known as the author of several historical books.

== Birth and ancestors ==
Michael Pratt was born at Bayham, near Lamberhurst in Kent, the younger son of John Charles Henry Pratt, 5th Marquess Camden, and his second wife, Averil Streatfield. The Pratt family were lawyers and politicians, and became wealthy through large property holdings, particularly in Camden Town, although the last properties in London were sold circa 1946. His father later sold the 100-room neo-Jacobean mansion at Bayham Abbey, near the ruins of the medieval Bayham Abbey, and built a new house nearby.

== Education ==
Pratt was educated at Eton and Balliol College, Oxford, where he read modern history and was secretary of the Gridiron, a lunch and dining club founded in 1884. He sustained severe injuries as a passenger in a road accident while an undergraduate, and sat his exams with a broken back, graduating with a second class degree. He worked for a brief time as a merchant banker for Lazard Brothers in the City of London, but left to become a writer.

== Books ==
He published his first book, Britain's Greek Empire, in 1978, reviewing the history of Corfu and the Ionian Islands from the 15th century, when the influence of Byzantium ended, through rule by Venice from 1401 and then as a British protectorate from the Napoleonic Wars until 1863, when the islands became part of the newly independent Greece. His second book, Great Country Houses of Central Europe, was published in 1990, with a revised edition in 2005. Finally, he published Nelson's Duchy in 2005, on Castello Nelson and the estate at Bronte in Sicily, granted to Lord Nelson by Ferdinand III of Sicily and IV of Naples.

He married Janet Giannuzzi Savelli in 1999. He suffered from poor health in later life, and underwent a triple heart bypass operation in 2006.

He had a life interest in Bayham Manor through a family trust, but was often in dispute with his trustees. Near the end of his life, he was evicted by the trustees so they could sell the house, but he was later let back in. He died at Bayham Manor in his sleep. He was survived by his wife. An inquest subsequently found that he had died after accidentally taking an overdose of the painkiller Tramadol at his house in Glen Ellyn, Il.

== Obituaries ==
His obituaries variously describe him as a "brainy buffoon", "Wodehouseian", "unusual and abrasive", "jolly, boisterous and odd", and a "wildly self-indulgent eccentric", with an unmistakable physical appearance, often wearing a three-piece suit with pink or purple socks and highly polished co-respondent shoes, topped by an untidy hat. He was at home in the gentlemen's clubs of St. James's, where he frequented White's and Pratt's, and had his hair cut at Trumper's.

A scathing anonymous obituary published in The Daily Telegraph on 8 September 2007 described him as "an unabashed snob and social interloper on a grand scale". It criticised him for outstaying his welcome as a house guest and failing to contribute to the cost of the lavish, over-engineered turbo kits he was famous for commissioning, and for "regaling listeners with stories of family matters". He was described as being unlucky with cars, having been involved in several accidents, and accident-prone with guns. Nor was he adept at running baths. A commentator in The Guardian described the obituary as the "least hagiographic obit ever published in the Telegraph." Other obituaries, notably in The Times and The Independent, stressed his generosity, good humour and wide circle of friends. A number of letters to the editor of The Daily Telegraph included one published on 11 September, which described the obituary as "mean-spirited", "in a number of respects, false", "a travesty of the truth", and "wicked" resulting in an apology some days later following a series of protests to the Editor from his many friends.
