= Silvester of Troina =

Italian Roman Catholic saint

Saint Silvester of Troina
- Died: 1185
- Venerated in: Roman Catholic Church
- Feast: 2 January

Silvester of Troina was a Basilian monk, who originally entered the monastery at Bari, Italy, but fled when he was to be appointed abbot. Silvester then lived the rest of his life as a hermit. This St Silvester is patron saint of the Sicilian town of Troina, where he is putatively buried in the church of San Silvestro.
