= Cerami (torrent) =

Location
- Country: Italy
- Region: Sicily

Physical characteristics
- Mouth: Salso
  - coordinates: 37.7003°N 14.4832°E

Basin features
- Progression: Salso→ Simeto→ Ionian Sea

The Cerami is a river in Sicily. It is located about 10 km south of the comune of Cerami and flows into the Salso (a tributary of the Simeto).
