= Troina (torrent) =

Location
- Country: Italy
- Region: Sicily

Physical characteristics
- Mouth: Simeto
  - coordinates: 37.8025°N 14.8003°E

Basin features
- Progression: Simeto→ Ionian Sea

The Troina is a torrent in Sicily. It is located near a town also named Troina and is in the comune (municipality) also bearing that name. It is both the inflow and outflow for Lake Ancipa. It empties into the Simeto near Bronte.
