= John Pratt, 3rd Marquess Camden =

British politician

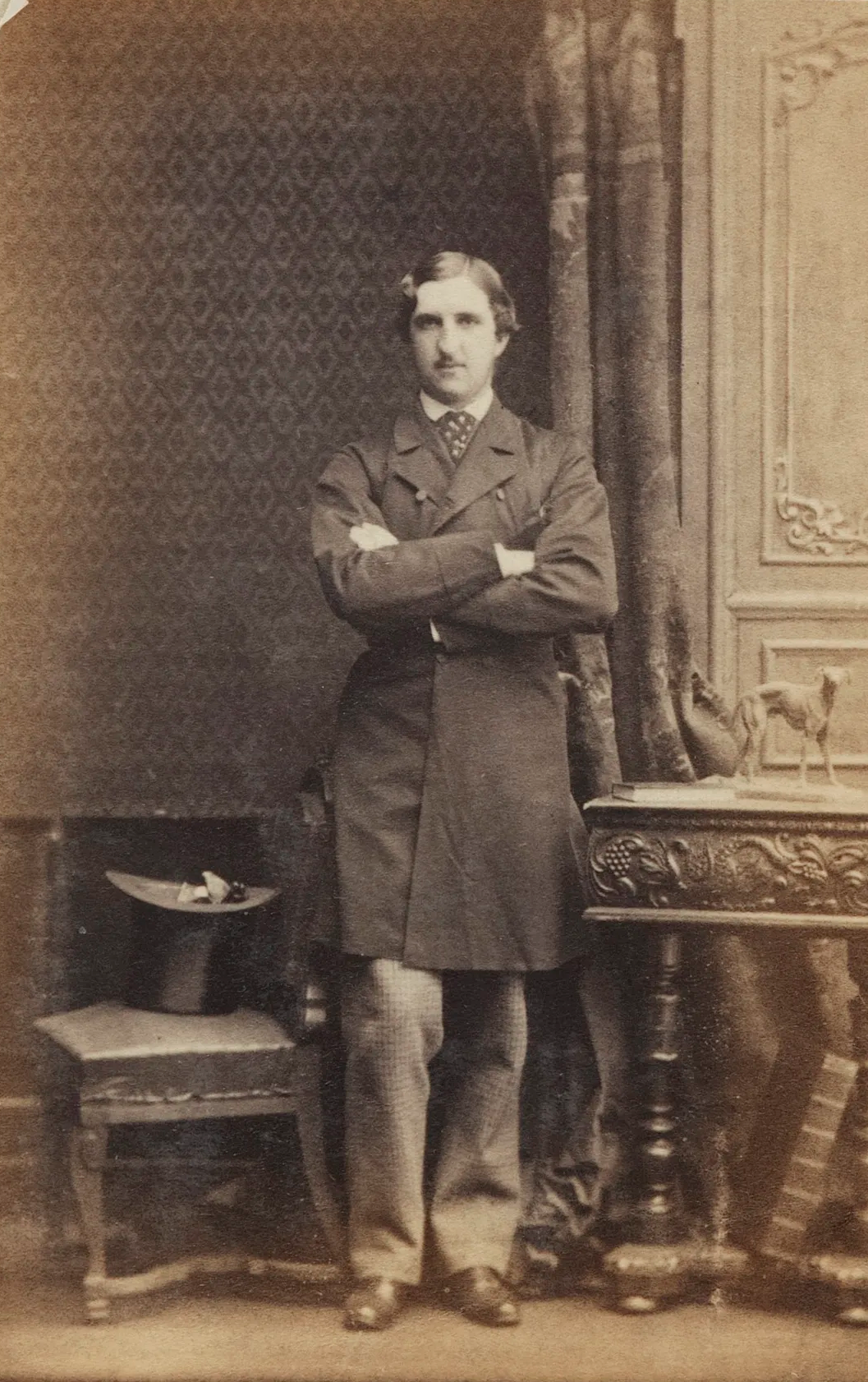
Portrait by Camille Silvy, 1861

John Charles Pratt, 3rd Marquess Camden DL (30 June 1840 – 4 May 1872), styled Viscount Bayham in 1840 and Earl of Brecknock between 1840 and 1866, was a British Liberal politician.

Camden was born at Belgrave Square, London, the eldest son of George Pratt, 2nd Marquess Camden, by Harriet, daughter of the Right Reverend George Murray, Bishop of Rochester. He was educated at Trinity College, Cambridge, graduating MA in 1860. In February 1866 he was returned to parliament for Brecon. However, in August of the same year he succeeded his father in the marquessate and entered the House of Lords.

Lord Camden married Lady Clementina Augusta, daughter of George Spencer-Churchill, 6th Duke of Marlborough, in 1866. They had three sons (of whom the two eldest died in infancy who are both buried at Bayham Old Abbey) and one daughter. He died at Eaton Square, London, in May 1872, aged 31, and was succeeded by his third but only surviving son, John, who was then two months old. The Marchioness Camden married as her second husband Captain Philip Green in 1876. She died in March 1886, aged 36.

Parliament of the United Kingdom
Preceded by John Lloyd Vaughan Watkins	Member of Parliament for Brecon; February–August 1866	Succeeded by Howel Gwyn
Peerage of the United Kingdom
Preceded by George Charles Pratt	Marquess Camden; 1866–1872	Succeeded by John Charles Pratt
