= San Silvestro, Troina =

Roman Catholic church in Italy

San Silvestro

Religion
- Affiliation: Roman Catholic
- Province: Enna

Location
- Location: Troina, Sicily, Italy
- Interactive map of San Silvestro
- Coordinates: 37°47′00″N 14°36′04″E

Architecture
- Type: Church
- Completed: 15th Century

San Silvestro is a Roman Catholic parish church located on Via Sccaone, along SS120, in the town of Troina, in the province of Enna, region of Sicily, Italy.

== History and description ==
A small church at this site, dedicated to St Bartholemew was present by the 13th-century; in this century, the tomb and body of St Silvester of Troina, a basilian monk and patron of the town, were putatively discovered. The church was granted to the Confraternity of San Silvestro in 1436. A new church was erected and the saint is now buried in the chapel crypt. The present church is the result of refurbishment in the 19th century. A central nave is separated from the aisles by solid stone columns with Corinthian capitals. The simplicity of the walls and the wooden choir stalls above a domed apse are completed in a late Renaissance style. The facade is simply articulated with pilasters. The nave leads to a domed apse. The tomb of St Sylvester of Troina is covered with a recumbent statue of white alabaster, attributed to followers of Antonello Gagini.
