= Rosemary Pratt, Marchioness Camden =

British noble (1921–2004)

The Most Honourable The Marchioness Camden
- Born: Cecil Rosemary Pawle; 9 May 1921
- Died: 27 February 2004 (aged 82); London, England
- Occupations: Socialite, artist
- Spouses: Peter Townsend (m. 1941; div. 1952) John de László (m. 1953; div. 1977) John Pratt, 5th Marquess Camden (m. 1978; died 1983)
- Children: 4
- Parent(s): Hanbury Pawle; Mary Cecil Hughes-Hallett

Cecil Rosemary Pratt, Marchioness Camden (née Pawle; 9 May 1921 – 27 February 2004) was a British socialite and artist, best known as the first wife of Group Captain Peter Townsend, who later became romantically involved with Princess Margaret.

== Early life and background ==
She was the daughter of Brigadier Hanbury Pawle CBE DL (1886–1972), a Deputy Lieutenant for Hertfordshire, by his marriage to Mary Cecil Hughes-Hallett (d. 1971), both of whom were from families of the landed gentry.

On 17 July 1941 at Much Hadham, Hertfordshire, she married Peter Townsend (1914–1995). Townsend was a decorated Royal Air Force pilot, who early in the Second World War had brought down the first German bomber to crash in England since 1918. In 1941, he was recovering from injuries incurred in a dogfight. The young Rosemary met the glamorous young ace, and married him after a whirlwind two-week courtship. Townsend later joined the Royal Household in 1944 under an "equerries of honour scheme". With Townsend, she had two sons, Giles (1942–2015) and Hugo (born 1945). King George VI was godfather to Hugo, who was briefly a monk and later married Yolande Princesse de Ligne, fourth daughter of Antoine, 13th Prince of Ligne and granddaughter of Charlotte, Grand Duchess of Luxembourg.

== Divorce ==
According to news reports, their marriage began to collapse due to Rosemary's social life and Townsend's prolonged absences from home. He later discovered Rosemary's affair with John de László, the youngest son of the painter Philip de László, and was granted a decree nisi in 1952 on the grounds of his wife's adultery in August 1951. Since Townsend was a divorced man, and divorce was then anathema to the British establishment and the royal household, Princess Margaret was told that she would lose her royal status and privileges if she married him.

The accounts of this period are somewhat in conflict, and some obituaries for Rosemary and her former husband have suggested a different story behind the official one. Princess Margaret and Townsend became close at some point before Townsend sued for divorce in November 1952; most obituaries state that the Princess turned to Townsend for comfort after the sudden death of her father in February 1952.

== Later life ==
Rosemary married John de László a year later and they had two children, Piers and Charlotte. John de László worked first in export and later as a stockbroker. Meanwhile, Rosemary became a painter, from which she made an income. According to The Times obituary, she had previously refused large sums from newspapers that wanted exclusives. She never spoke publicly about her first marriage or her divorce.

She was divorced from her second husband in 1977; and on 12 January 1978, at Kensington registry office, she became the third wife of John Charles Henry Pratt, 5th Marquess Camden. He died in 1983, and she died in London on 27 February 2004, aged 82, having outlived all three of her husbands: Townsend died in 1995 and de László in 1990. She was survived by three sons and one daughter: Giles Townsend (1942-2015), Hugo Townsend (b. 1945), Charlotte Watkins (née de László), and Piers de László, and several grandchildren.
