= Troina =

Troina Traina (Sicilian)
- Comune
- Comune di Troina
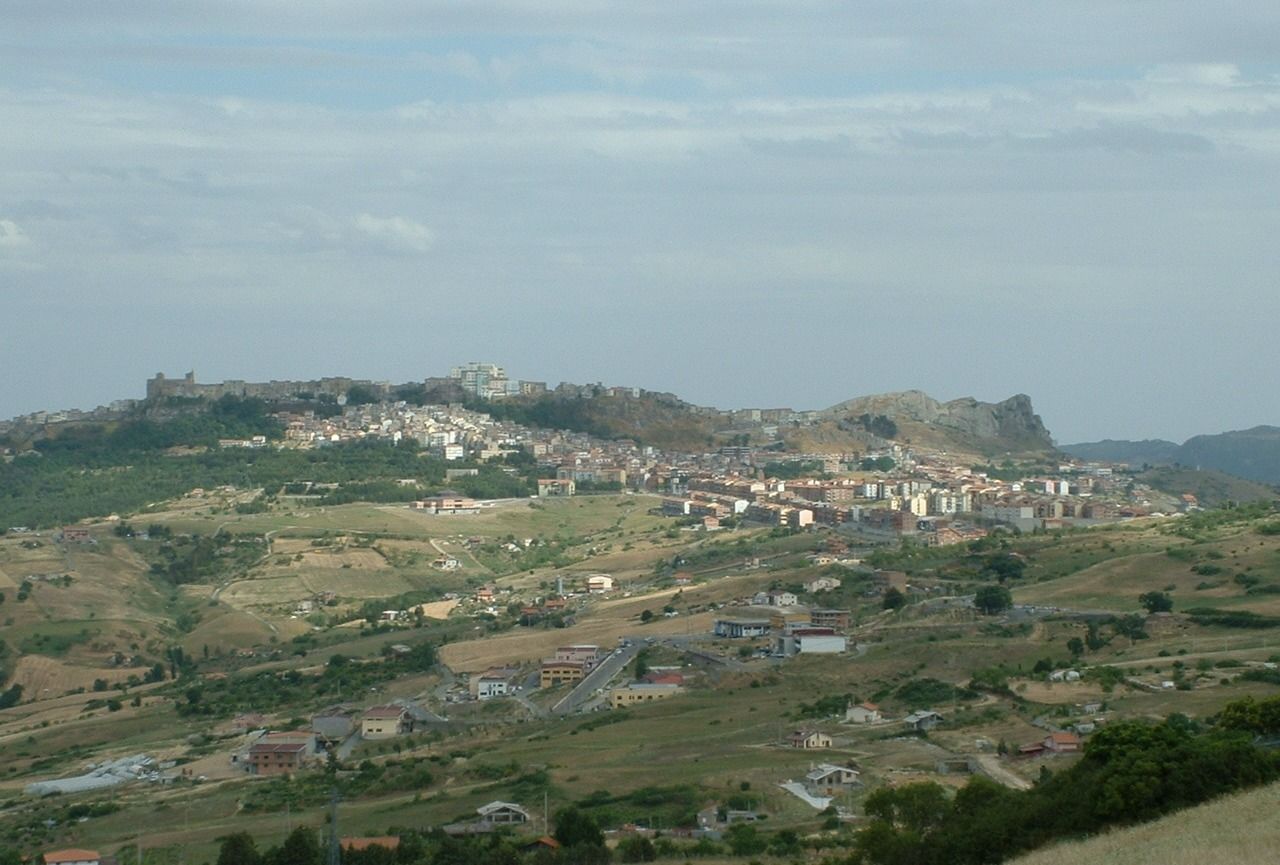
- View of Troina

- Location within Italy Location within Sicily
- Coordinates: 37°47′N 14°36′E
- Country: Italy
- Region: Sicily
- Province: Enna (EN)

Government
  - Mayor: Alfio Giachino

Area
  - Total: 168.28 km^{2} (64.97 sq mi)
- Elevation: 1,121 m (3,678 ft)

Population (2026)
  - Total: 8,201
  - Density: 48.73/km^{2} (126.2/sq mi)
- Demonym: Troinesi
- Time zone: UTC+1 (CET)
  - Summer (DST): UTC+2 (CEST)
- Postal code: 94018
- Dialing code: 0935
- Patron saint: St. Sylvester
- Saint day: June 3
- Website: Official website

Troina (Sicilian: Traina) is a town and comune (municipality) in the Province of Enna in the autonomous island region of Sicily in southern Italy, located about 30 kilometres (19 mi) northeast of Enna and 110 kilometres (68 mi) southeast of Palermo. It is located in the Nebrodi Park. It has 8,201 inhabitants.

Troina borders the municipalities of Regalbuto, Gagliano Castelferrato, Cerami, Bronte, Randazzo, San Teodoro, and Cesarò.

It is one of I Borghi più belli d'Italia ("The most beautiful villages of Italy").

== History ==
Excavations have proved that the area of Troina was settled as early as the 7th millennium BC (a farm dating from that period, and a later necropolis). Of the Greek town (most likely known as Engyon) parts of the 4th-century-BC walls remain, while from the Roman age are baths. After the fall of the Western Roman Empire it was a Byzantine stronghold and during the Islamic period the religious and moral capital of the Greek and Christian Orthodox part of Sicily. It was the site of the Battle of Troina. Roger I of Sicily had in its castle (which he captured in 1061) also a start base of his conquest of the island.

During World War II, Troina was the site of a battle between the Allies and the Axis forces. The town was mostly destroyed during the six-day fighting (31 July – 6 August 1943).

In 2021 the town began selling homes for as little as one euro in an effort to lure residents and increase the population size.

== Demographics ==
As of 2026, the population is 8,201, of which 48.5% are males, and 51.5% are females. Minors make up 13.4% of the population, and seniors make up 28.9%.

Historical population

| Year | Pop. | ±% |
|---|---|---|
| 1861 | 8,447 | — |
| 1871 | 10,242 | +21.3% |
| 1881 | 10,348 | +1.0% |
| 1901 | 12,412 | +19.9% |
| 1911 | 12,453 | +0.3% |
| 1921 | 11,831 | −5.0% |
| 1931 | 12,361 | +4.5% |
| 1936 | 12,024 | −2.7% |

| Year | Pop. | ±% |
|---|---|---|
| 1951 | 14,075 | +17.1% |
| 1961 | 13,066 | −7.2% |
| 1971 | 11,853 | −9.3% |
| 1981 | 11,052 | −6.8% |
| 1991 | 10,406 | −5.8% |
| 2001 | 10,061 | −3.3% |
| 2011 | 9,628 | −4.3% |
| 2021 | 8,642 | −10.2% |

Source: ISTAT

=== Immigration ===
As of 2025, immigrants make up 4.5% of the population. The 5 largest foreign countries of birth are Germany, Romania, Switzerland, Argentina, and Tunisia.

== Main sights ==
- Santa Maria Maggiore
- San Silvestro

== International relations ==
=== Twin towns — sister cities ===
Troina is twinned with:

- Coutances, France

== See also ==
- Battle of Troina
- List of Catholic dioceses in Italy
- Troina (torrent)
