= San Teodoro, Sicily =

San Teodoro
- Comune
- Comune di San Teodoro
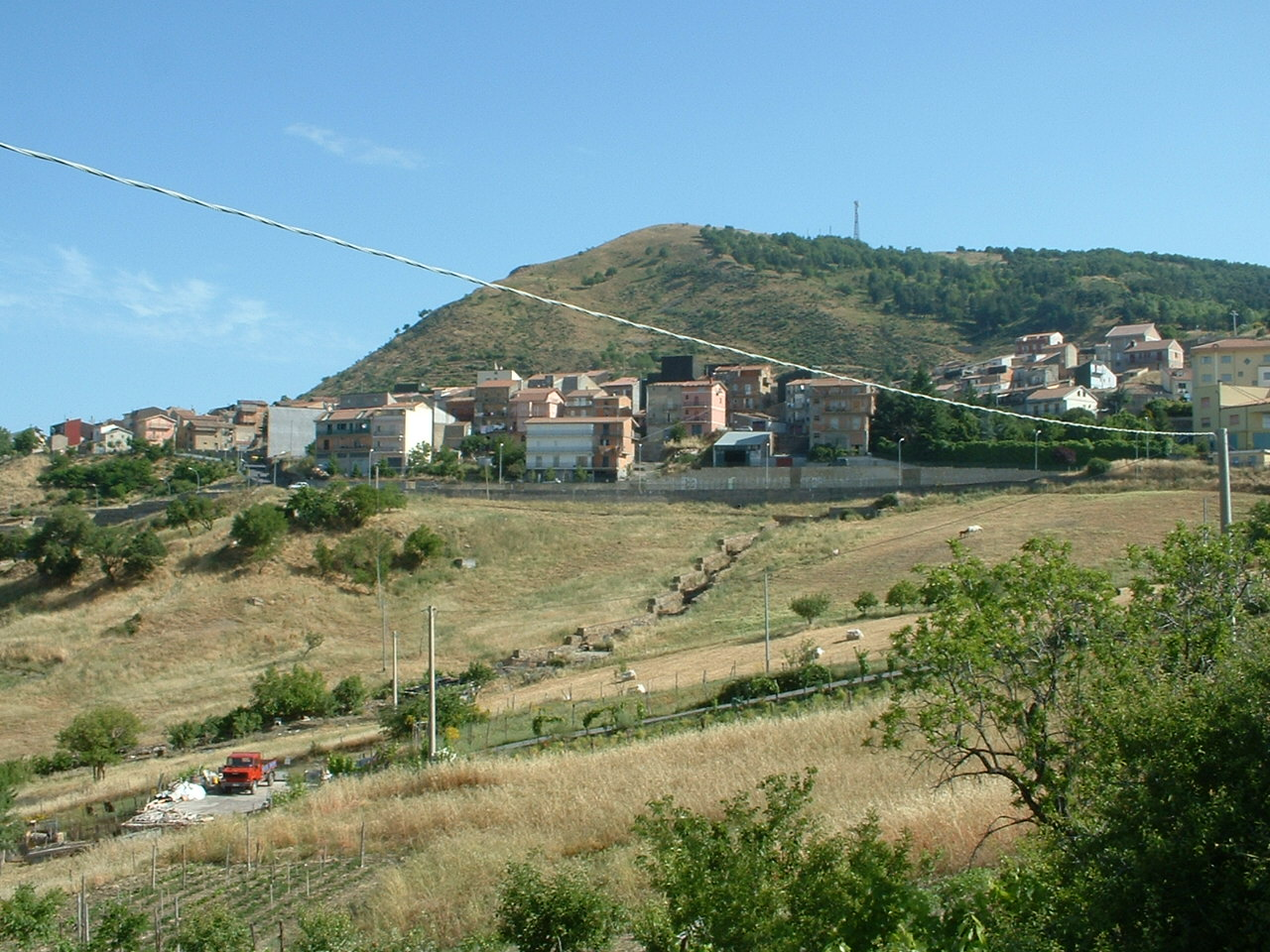

- Coat of arms

- Location within Italy Location within Sicily
- Coordinates: 37°51′N 14°42′E
- Country: Italy
- Region: Sicily
- Metropolitan city: Messina (ME)

Government
  - Mayor: Valentina Costantino

Area
  - Total: 13.97 km^{2} (5.39 sq mi)
- Elevation: 1,150 m (3,770 ft)

Population (31 December 2010)
  - Total: 1,420
  - Density: 102/km^{2} (263/sq mi)
- Demonym: Santeodoresi
- Time zone: UTC+1 (CET)
  - Summer (DST): UTC+2 (CEST)
- Postal code: 98030
- Dialing code: 095
- Patron saint: St. Cajetan
- Website: Official website

San Teodoro (Sicilian: U Casali) is a comune (municipality) in the Province of Messina in the Italian region Sicily, located about 120 kilometres (75 mi) east of Palermo and about 80 kilometres (50 mi) southwest of Messina.

San Teodoro borders the following municipalities: Cesarò, Troina.
