= Sant'Ambrogio, Cerami =

Church building in Cerami, Italy

Sant'Ambrogio
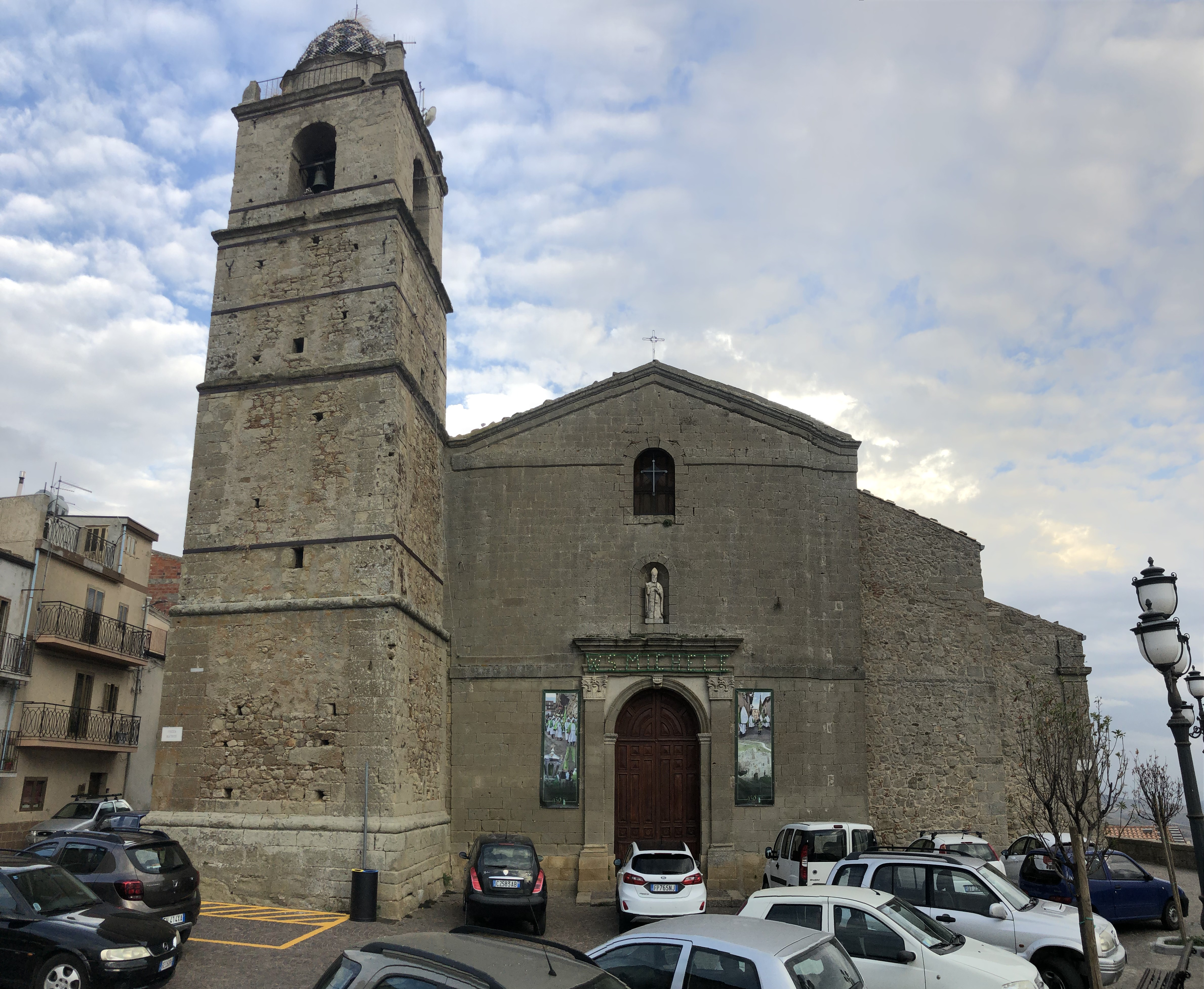
- The façade of the church.

Religion
- Affiliation: Roman Catholic
- Province: Enna

Location
- Location: Cerami, Sicily, Italy
- Interactive map of Sant'Ambrogio
- Coordinates: 37°48′43″N 14°30′30″E

Architecture
- Type: Church
- Completed: 15th Century

Sant'Ambrogio is the Roman Catholic mother church or chiesa matrice in the center of the town of Cerami, in the province of Enna, region of Sicily, Italy.

== History and description ==
A church at this site, dedicated to St Ambrose, was likely implanted by the Norman conquerors of the 12th-century. A larger church was initially built in 1455 and refurbished in the following centuries. It houses a white marble Madonna and Child by Antonello Gagini. It also has an 18th-century statues of St Michael Archangel by Filippo Quattrocchi of Gangi.
