= John Pratt, 1st Marquess Camden =

British politician (1759–1840)

The Most Honourable The Marquess Camden KG PC FSA
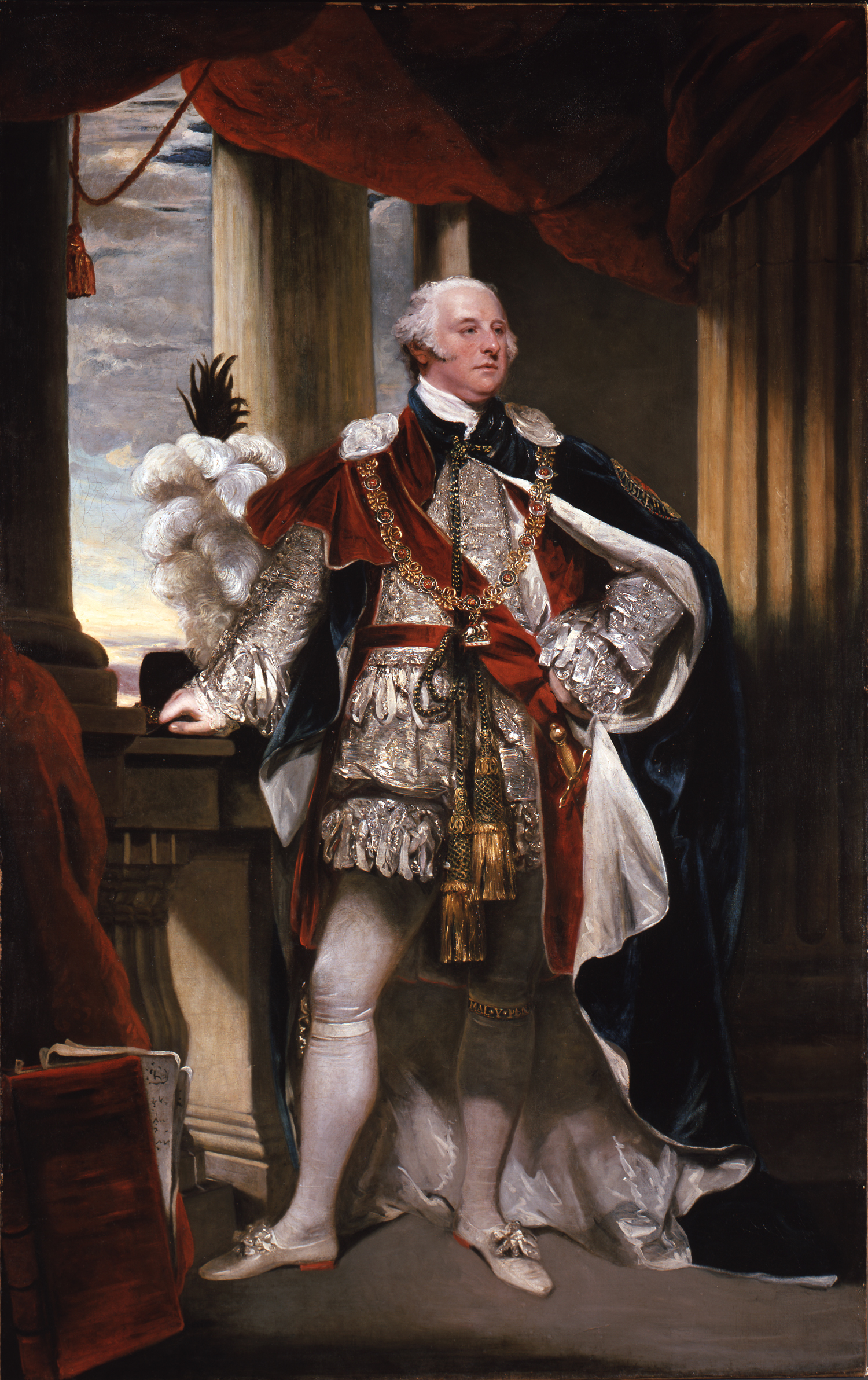
- Portrait of Lord Camden by John Hoppner, 1806

Lord Lieutenant of Ireland
- In office 13 March 1795 – 14 June 1798
- Monarch: George III
- Prime Minister: William Pitt the Younger
- Preceded by: The Earl Fitzwilliam
- Succeeded by: The Marquess Cornwallis

Secretary of State for War and the Colonies
- In office 14 May 1804 – 10 July 1805
- Monarch: George III
- Prime Minister: William Pitt the Younger
- Preceded by: Lord Hobart
- Succeeded by: Viscount Castlereagh

Lord President of the Council
- In office 10 July 1805 – 19 February 1806
- Monarch: George III
- Prime Minister: William Pitt the Younger
- Preceded by: Viscount Sidmouth
- Succeeded by: The Earl Fitzwilliam
- In office 26 March 1807 – 8 April 1812
- Monarch: George III
- Prime Minister: The Duke of Portland; Spencer Perceval
- Preceded by: Viscount Sidmouth
- Succeeded by: Viscount Sidmouth

Member of Parliament for Bath
- In office 1780–1794
- Preceded by: Sir John Sebright, Bt
- Succeeded by: Sir Richard Arden

Personal details
- Born: 11 February 1759 Lincoln's Inn Fields, London
- Died: 8 October 1840 (aged 81) Seal, Kent
- Party: Tory
- Spouse(s): Frances Molesworth (d. 1829)
- Children: 4, including George
- Education: Trinity College, Cambridge

John Jeffreys Pratt, 1st Marquess Camden (11 February 1759 – 8 October 1840), styled Viscount Bayham from 1786 to 1794 and known as the 2nd Earl Camden from 1794 to 1812, was a British politician. He served as Lord Lieutenant of Ireland in the revolutionary years 1795 to 1798 and as Secretary of State for War and the Colonies between 1804 and 1805.

== Background and education ==
John Jeffreys Pratt was born at Lincoln's Inn Fields, London, the only son of the barrister Charles Pratt, KC (a son of Sir John Pratt, a former Lord Chief Justice of the King's Bench), and Elizabeth, daughter of Nicholas Jeffreys, of The Priory, Brecknockshire. He was baptised on the day Halley's Comet appeared. In 1765, his father (by then Sir Charles Pratt, having been appointed Chief Justice of the Common Pleas in 1762) was created Baron Camden, at which point he became The Hon. John Pratt. He was educated at the University of Cambridge (Trinity College).

== Political career ==
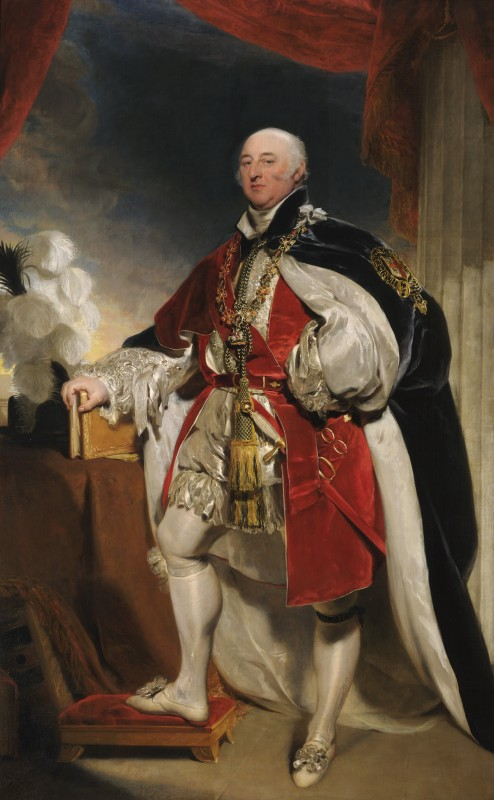
Portrait by Thomas Lawrence, 1802

In 1780, Pratt was elected Member of Parliament for Bath and obtained the position of Teller of the Exchequer the same year, a lucrative office which he kept until his death, although after 1812 he refused to receive the large income arising from it. He served under Lord Shelburne as Lord of the Admiralty between 1782 and 1783 and in the same post under William Pitt the Younger between 1783 and 1789, as well as a Lord of the Treasury between 1789 and 1792.

In 1786, his father was created Earl Camden, at which point he became known by one of his father's subsidiary titles as Viscount Bayham.

In 1793, Bayham was sworn of the Privy Council. In 1794 he succeeded his father as 2nd Earl Camden, and the following year he was appointed Lord Lieutenant of Ireland by Pitt.

As an opponent of parliamentary reform and of Catholic emancipation, Camden's term of office was one of turbulence, culminating in the rebellion of 1798. His refusal in 1797 to reprieve the United Irishman William Orr, convicted of treason on the word of one witness of dubious credit (and for which his own sister Frances, Lady Londonderry, petitioned him), aroused great public indignation. To break the United Irish conspiracy, he suspended habeas corpus and unleashed a ruthless martial-law campaign to disarm and break up the republican organization.

He resigned from office in June 1798, to be replaced with Lord Cornwallis, who oversaw the military defeat of the rebellion. In 1804, Camden became Secretary of State for War and the Colonies under Pitt, and in 1805 Lord President of the Council, an office he retained until 1806. He was again Lord President from 1807 to 1812, after which date he remained for some time in the cabinet without office. In 1812 he was created Earl of Brecknock and Marquess Camden.

The enforced resignation from the Cabinet of Lord Castlereagh, the stepson of his sister Frances (Lady Londonderry), to whom he had always been personally close, in September 1809, led to a series of bitter family quarrels, when it became clear that Camden had known for months of the plan to dismiss Castlereagh, but had given him no warning. Castlereagh himself regarded Camden as "a weak friend", not an enemy, and they were eventually reconciled. Other members of the Stewart family, however, never forgave Camden for what they regarded as his disloyalty.

Camden was also Lord Lieutenant of Kent between 1808 and 1840 and appointed himself Colonel of the Cranbrook and Woodsgate Regiment of Local Militia in 1809. He was Chancellor of Cambridge University between 1834 and 1840. He was made a Knight of the Garter in 1799 and elected a Fellow of the Society of Antiquaries of London in 1802.

== Family ==
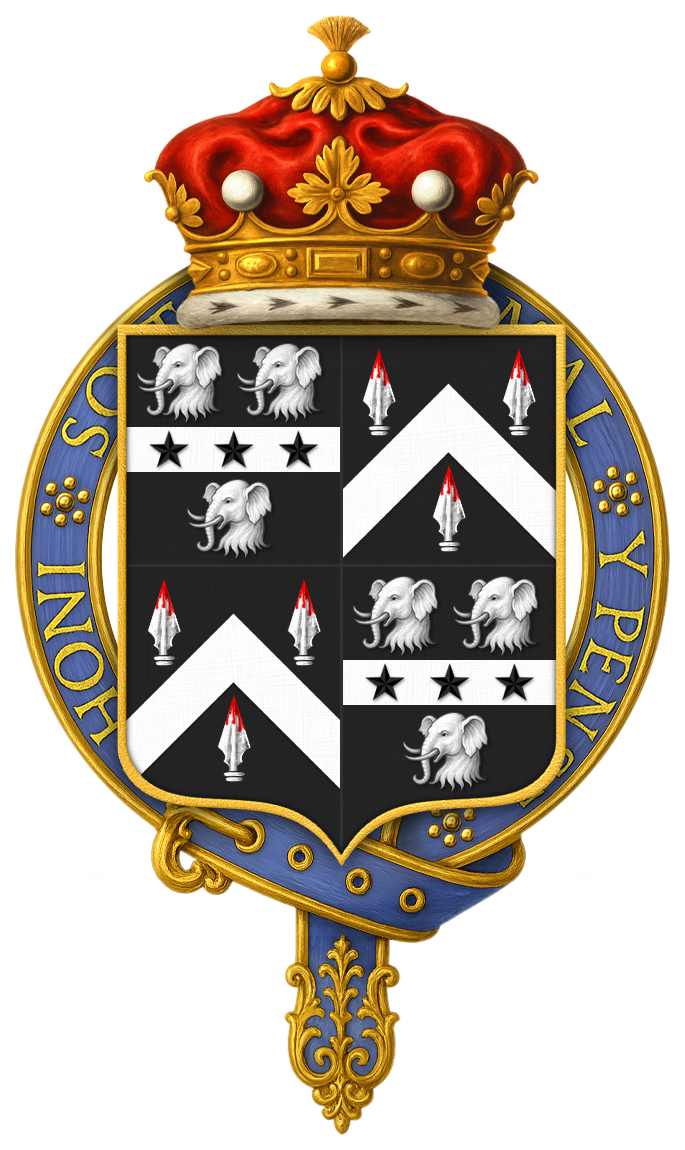
Quartered arms of John Jeffreys Pratt, 1st Marquess Camden, KG, PC

Lord Camden married Frances, daughter of William Molesworth, in 1785. She died at Bayham Abbey, Sussex, in July 1829. Lord Camden survived her by eleven years and died at Seal, Kent, on 8 October 1840, aged 81. He was succeeded by his only son, George.

The family owned and lived in a house located at 22 Arlington Street in St. James's, a district of the City of Westminster in central London, which is adjoining the Ritz Hotel. In the year of his death, he sold the house to The 7th Duke of Beaufort.

Parliament of Great Britain
Preceded by Abel Moysey; Sir John Sebright, Bt	Member of Parliament for Bath; 1780–1794 with Abel Moysey 1780–1790; Viscount Weymouth 1790–1794	Succeeded by Viscount Weymouth; Sir Richard Arden
Political offices
Preceded by Thomas Townshend	Teller of the Exchequer; 1780–1834	Office abolished
Preceded by The Earl Fitzwilliam	Lord Lieutenant of Ireland; 1795–1798	Succeeded by The Marquess Cornwallis
Preceded by Lord Hobart	Secretary of State for War and the Colonies; 1804–1805	Succeeded by Viscount Castlereagh
Preceded by The Viscount Sidmouth	Lord President of the Council; 1805–1806	Succeeded by The Earl Fitzwilliam
Preceded by The Viscount Sidmouth	Lord President of the Council; 1807–1812	Succeeded by The Viscount Sidmouth
Honorary titles
Preceded by The Earl of Romney	Lord Lieutenant of Kent; 1808–1840	Succeeded by The Earl of Thanet
Vacant Title last held by The Duke of Dorset	Vice-Admiral of Kent; 1808–1840	Vacant
Academic offices
Preceded by The Duke of Gloucester and Edinburgh	Chancellor of Cambridge University; 1834–1840	Succeeded by The Duke of Northumberland
Peerage of the United Kingdom
New title	Marquess Camden; 1812–1840	Succeeded by George Charles Pratt
Peerage of Great Britain
Preceded by Charles Pratt	Earl Camden; 1794–1840	Succeeded by George Charles Pratt
Preceded by Charles Pratt	Baron Camden (descended by acceleration); 1794–1835	Succeeded by George Charles Pratt
