= Marquesses in the United Kingdom =

Rank of nobility in the peerages of the United Kingdom

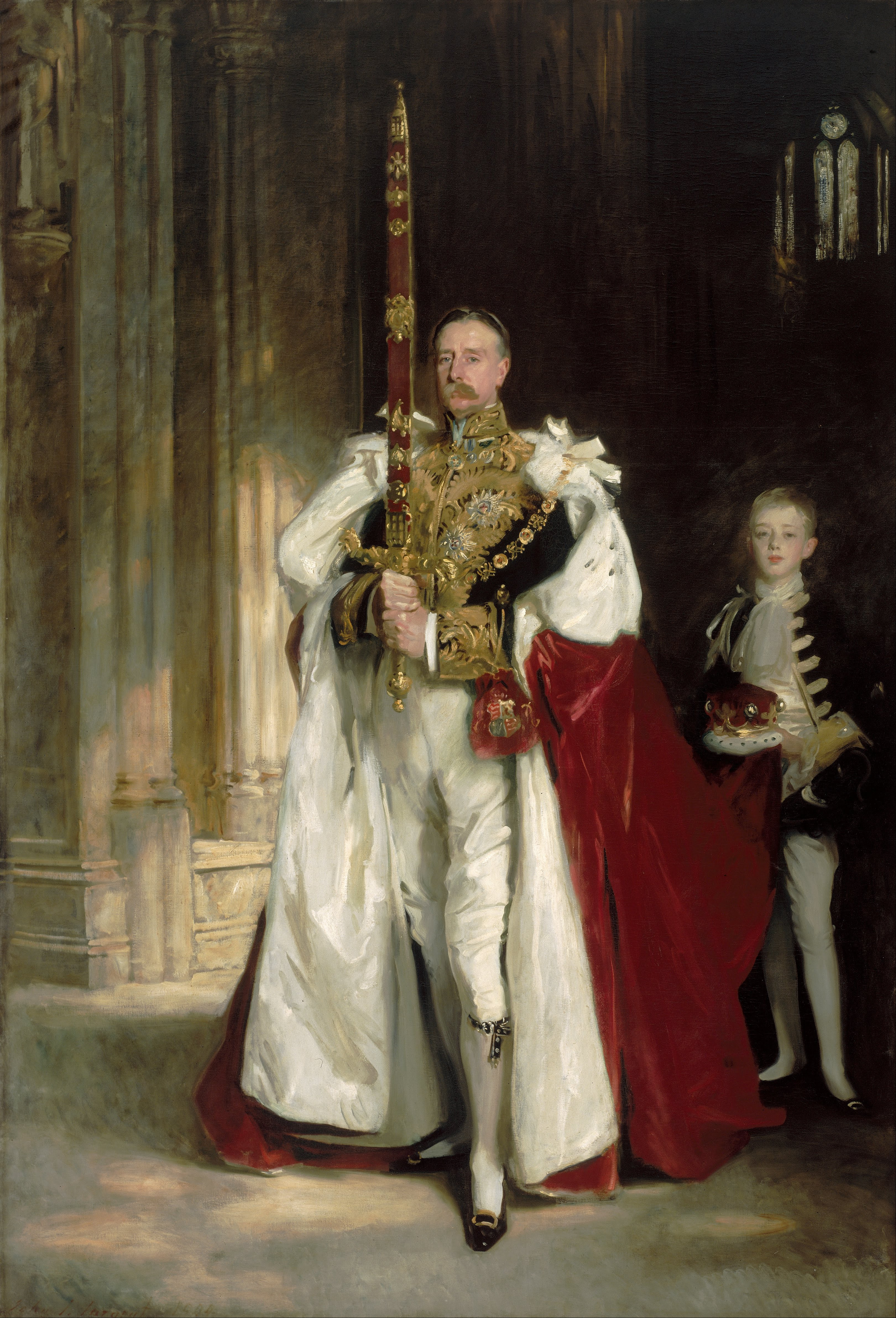
Charles Vane-Tempest-Stewart, 6th Marquess of Londonderry, carrying the Sword of State at the coronation of Edward VII; a page bears his coronet, which has four strawberry leaves and four silver balls.

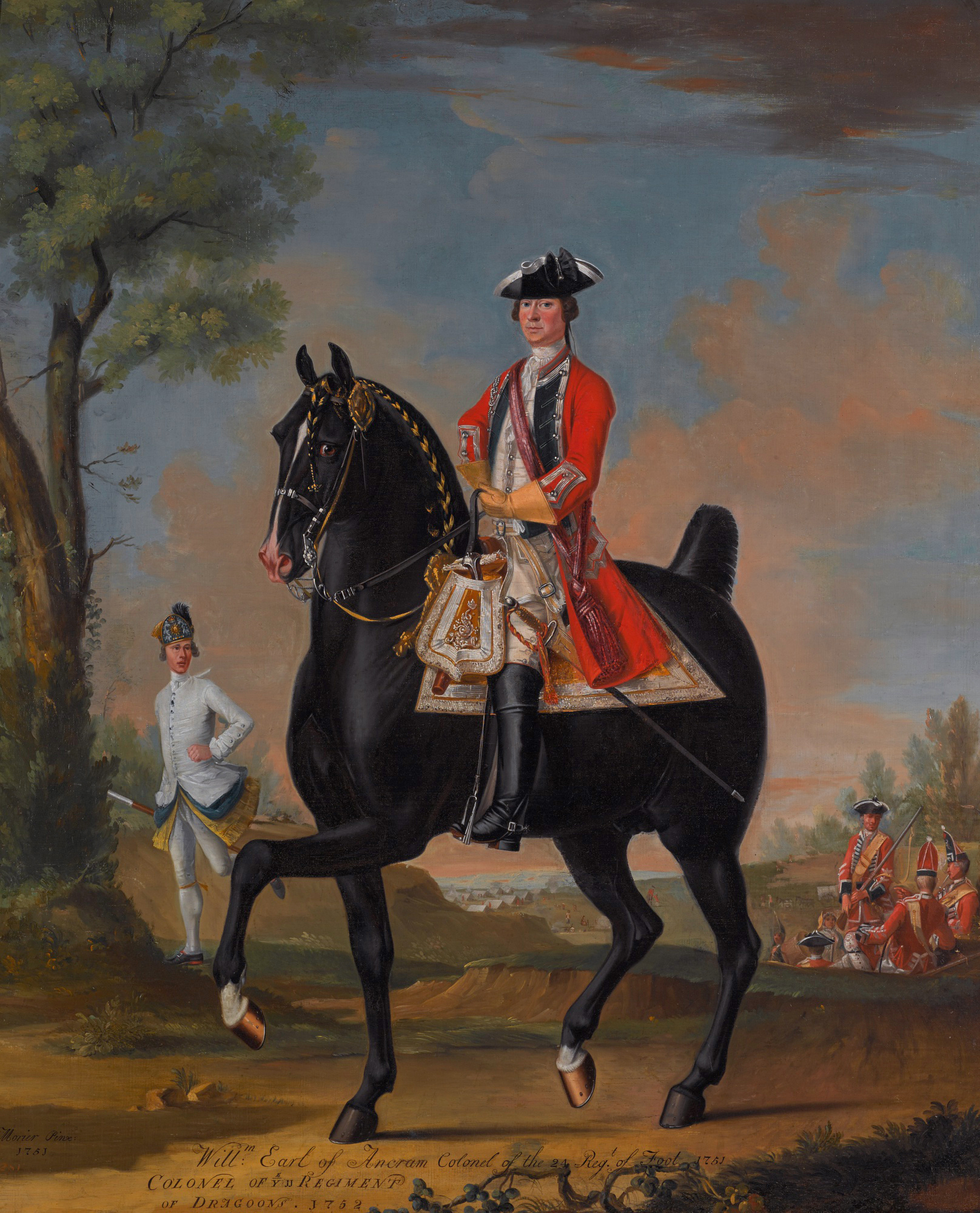
A portrait of William Kerr, 4th Marquess of Lothian wearing his British Army uniform.

Marquess is a rank of nobility in the peerages of the United Kingdom, ranking below a duke and above an earl. There are currently 35 marquessates.

== Peerage of England ==
The first marquess in England was Robert de Vere, 9th Earl of Oxford, who was created Marquess of Dublin by King Richard II of England on 1 December 1385. On 13 October 1386, the patent of this marquessate was recalled, and Robert de Vere was raised to Duke of Ireland. John Beaufort, 1st Earl of Somerset, the second illegitimate son of John of Gaunt, was raised to the second marquessate as the Marquess of Dorset in September 1397.

In 1399, he was disgraced, and the king revoked his marquessate. The House of Commons of England later petitioned King Henry IV for his restoration, but the King objected, stating "the name of marquess is a strange name in this realm". From that period the title appears to have been dormant until it was revived by Henry VI in 1442. The only woman to be appointed as a marquess in her own right was Anne Boleyn, who was created Marchioness of Pembroke in preparation for her marriage to Henry VIII. The investiture ceremony was held at Windsor Castle on 1 September 1532.

The Marquess of Winchester (created in 1551) is the oldest surviving English or British marquessate, and as a result the holder of the title is considered the "Premier Marquess of England". Since marquessates in England created after 1707 became marquessates of Great Britain and, from 1801, of the United Kingdom, he is now the only English marquess with no higher rank. All other marquesses in the Peerage of England are also dukes and use their title of Marquess as a subsidiary title.

== Peerage of Ireland ==
The first marquesses (Irish: marcas) in the Peerage of Ireland were Randal MacDonnell, 1st Marquess of Antrim (1645) and Ulick Burke, 1st Marquess of Clanricarde (1646), both titles created during the Irish Confederate Wars. (The above-mentioned Robert de Vere was created Marquess of Dublin and Duke of Ireland, but both of these were titles in the Peerage of England, not Ireland.)

The Marquess of Waterford (created 1791) is the oldest surviving Irish marquessate, currently held by Henry Beresford, 9th Marquess of Waterford.

== Peerage of the United Kingdom ==
The title Marquess was always higher than that of an Earl. In the late 19th and the 20th century many Viceroys of India were created marquesses after their term of office. (It is indicative of the importance of the Indian Empire in British national life that retiring Viceroys were offered marquessates while retiring prime ministers were offered only earldoms). Some of the German relations of King George V were made marquesses in the Peerage of the United Kingdom after renouncing their German princely titles in 1917. Prince Louis of Battenberg, the princely head of the Battenberg family and the maternal grandfather of Prince Philip, Duke of Edinburgh, became the first Marquess of Milford Haven.

The last marquess created by the British crown was the Marquess of Willingdon in 1936. The creation of new hereditary titles is today confined almost exclusively to members of the royal family, but the creation of new marquessates appears to have ceased entirely. When new Royal Dukes are created (such as the Duke of Cambridge in 2011), the preferred next-highest subsidiary title appears to be that of an earldom. No explanation for this apparent policy of omitting marquessates has been forthcoming.

== Forms of address ==
An English or British marquess is formally styled "The Most Honourable The Marquess of [X]" and less formally styled "Lord [X]', and his wife "Lady [X]". As with dukes, all sons of a marquess have the courtesy style of "the Lord Forename [Surname]" and all daughters have the courtesy style of "the Lady Forename [Surname]". The style for the eldest son, however, is often trumped by a subsidiary title of his father, such as earl or viscount, which is used instead. Especially for signing documents, the signature being only the name of the title, [X]). This form of signature is true for all peers, including peers by courtesy. For example, the Marquess of Salisbury would sign his name merely "Salisbury".

A marquess by courtesy, however (who would always be the heir to a dukedom, since the courtesy title of an heir must always be at least one rank below that of the peer), does not enjoy the style of "Most Honourable", but is merely Marquess of [X], without the definite article. The genuine marquess as a peer, however, is always "The Most Honourable The Marquess of [X]", to differentiate a marquess by courtesy (i.e., the heir to a dukedom) from a marquess in his own right.

The spelling of the title in a few older Scottish cases is "Marquis", particularly when the title was created prior to the formation of the Kingdom of Great Britain in 1707.

== Coronet ==
The coronet of a marquess in heraldry

A British marquess is entitled to a coronet bearing four strawberry leaves (three visible in two-dimensional depiction) and four silver spheres round the rim (two visible in two-dimensional depiction). The actual coronet is worn mostly on certain ceremonial occasions, but a marquess can bear his coronet of rank on his coat of arms above the shield.

== See also ==
- Peerage of the United Kingdom
- British nobility
- List of marquesses in the peerages of Britain and Ireland
- List of marquessates in the peerages of Britain and Ireland
