= George Pratt, 2nd Marquess Camden =

British politician

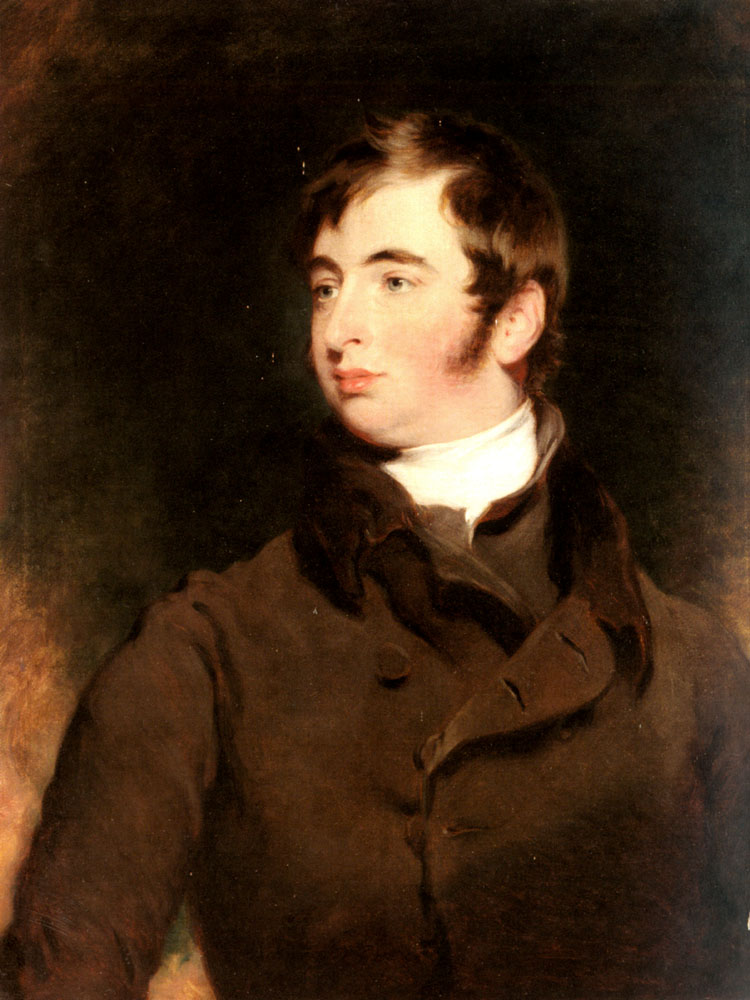
The second Marquess Camden

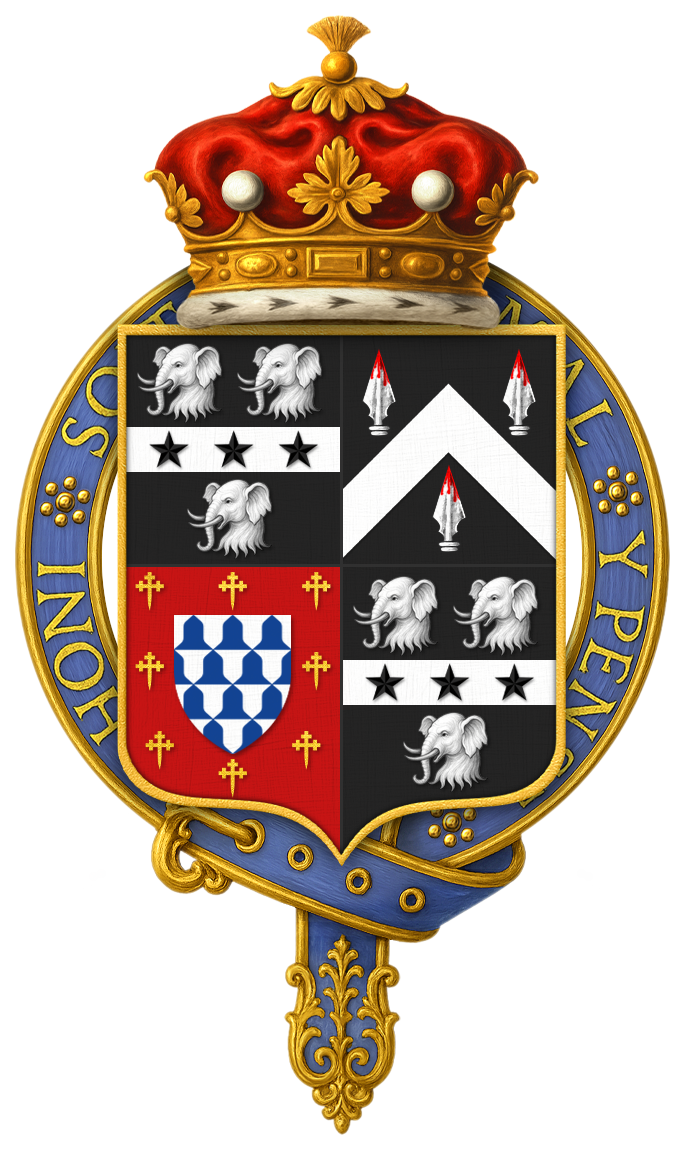
Quartered arms of George Charles Pratt, 2nd Marquess Camden, KG

George Charles Pratt, 2nd Marquess Camden, KG (2 May 1799 – 6 August 1866) was a British peer and Tory politician, styled Viscount Bayham from 1794 to 1812 and Earl of Brecknock in 1812–1840.

Pratt's father was John Pratt, Viscount Bayham, eldest son of Charles Pratt, 1st Earl Camden. His mother was Frances Molesworth, daughter of William Molesworth of Wembury, Devon (the second son of Sir John Molesworth, 4th Baronet).

In 1821, Brecknock became Tory Member of Parliament for Ludgershall, then for Bath in 1830 and finally for Dunwich in 1831. He was also a Lord of the Admiralty from 1828 to 1829.

On 8 January 1835, he was called to the House of Lords in his father's barony of Camden and was married later that year, on 27 August, to Harriet Murray (1813–1854), the daughter of George Murray, Bishop of Rochester. His wife was later made a Lady of the Bedchamber and they had eleven children.

In 1840, Camden inherited his father's titles. He was appointed a Knight of the Garter in 1846 and Lord Lieutenant of Brecknockshire in 1865.

He died at his country seat, Bayham Abbey, near Tunbridge Wells on 6 August 1866, having a few days earlier presided at the annual meeting of the Kent Archaeological Society at Ashford. His titles passed to his eldest son, John, Earl of Brecknock.

== Sources ==
- Cokayne et al., The Complete Peerage

Parliament of the United Kingdom
Preceded by The Earl of Carhampton; Sandford Graham	Member of Parliament for Ludgershall; 1821–1826; With: Sandford Graham	Succeeded by George Agar-Ellis; Edward Foley
Preceded by Lord John Thynne; Charles Palmer	Member of Parliament for Bath; 1826–1830; With: Lord John Thynne	Succeeded by Lord John Thynne; Charles Palmer
Preceded by Andrew Arcedeckne; Frederick Barne	Member of Parliament for Dunwich; 1831–1832; With: Frederick Barne	Succeeded by Frederick Barne; Viscount Lowther
Honorary titles
Preceded by Lloyd Watkins	Lord Lieutenant of Brecknockshire; 1865–1866	Succeeded by The Lord Tredegar
Peerage of the United Kingdom
Preceded by John Pratt	Marquess Camden; 1840–1866	Succeeded by John Pratt
Peerage of Great Britain
Preceded by John Pratt	Baron Camden (writ of acceleration); 1835–1866	Succeeded by John Pratt
