= John Pratt, 5th Marquess Camden =

British Member of the House of Lords

Marquess Camden in 1953.

John Charles Henry Pratt, 5th Marquess Camden (12 April 1899 – 22 March 1983) was a British peer, soldier, and landowner, a member of the House of Lords from 1943 until his death.

== Early life ==
The son of John Pratt, 4th Marquess Camden, later Lord Lieutenant of Kent, and his wife Lady Joan Marion Nevill, a daughter of Henry Nevill, 3rd Marquess of Abergavenny, he was styled as Earl of Brecknock from birth and was educated at Eton College and the Royal Military College, Sandhurst.

== Career ==
Commissioned into the Scots Guards, he rose to the rank of major and was later appointed as Honorary Colonel of the 516 Light Anti-Aircraft Regiment, Royal Artillery.

In civilian life, Brecknock was a director of Darracq Motor Engineering Company, Bayard Cars Ltd, and Pobjoy Aircraft & Airmotors.

On 14 December 1943, Brecknock succeeded as Marquess Camden (1812), Earl of Camden (1786), Earl of Brecknock (1812), Viscount Bayham (1786), and Baron Camden of Camden Place, Chislehurst, Kent (1765).

In 1945 he became a Justice of the Peace and in 1957 a Deputy Lieutenant.

== Personal life ==
On 19 October 1920, at St Margaret's, Westminster, Lord Brecknock married firstly Marjorie Minna Jenkins (1900–1989), a daughter of Col. Atherton Edward Jenkins. Before their divorce in 1941, they were the parents of two children:

- Lady Mary Clementine (1921–2002)
- David George Edward Henry (born 1930)

Marjorie, who retained the title Countess of Brecknock, was a Superintendent of the St John Ambulance Brigade and a lady-in-waiting to Princess Marina, Duchess of Kent. In 1988, with Dame Mary Fagan and Dr Marjorie Williams, she began fundraising for a hospice in Andover. The Countess of Brecknock Hospice opened after Lady Brecknock's death, the Duchess of Kent having laid the foundation stone.

On 31 January 1942 he married secondly Averil Streatfeild, daughter of Colonel H. S. J. Streatfeild. Together they were the parents of one son:

- Lord Michael John Henry Pratt (1946–2007)

In 1978, as Lord Camden, he married thirdly Cecil Rosemary Pawle, a daughter of Brigadier Hanbury Pawle, former wife of Peter Townsend.

== Notes ==
Peerage of the United Kingdom
Preceded by John Charles Pratt	Marquess Camden; 1943–1983	Succeeded by David George Edward Henry Pratt
