= Lake Ancipa =

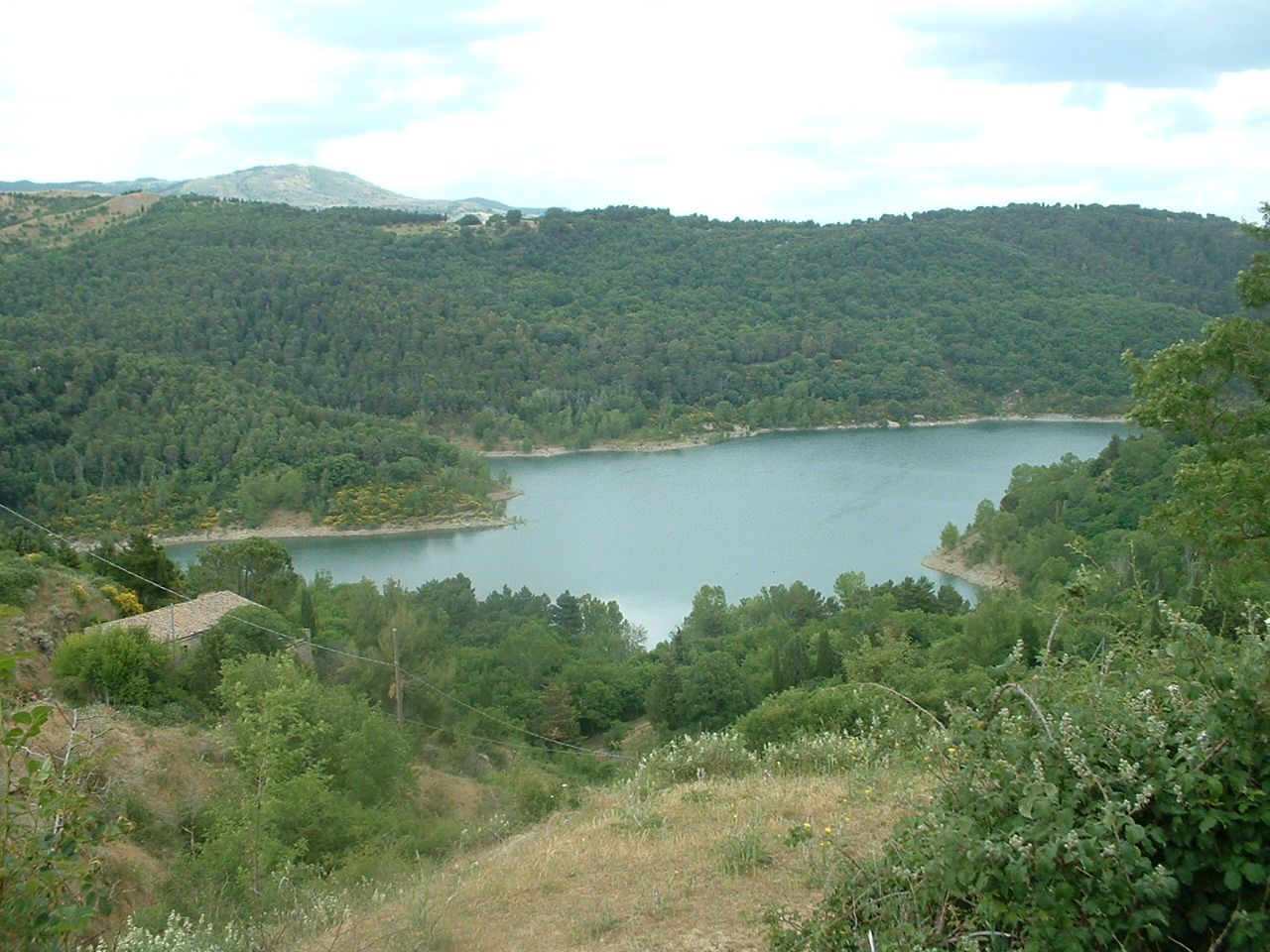

- Location within Sicily
- Location: Province of Enna/Province of Messina, Sicily
- Coordinates: 37.8357°N 14.5614°E
- Type: reservoir
- Primary inflows: torrente Troina
- Primary outflows: torrente Troina
- Catchment area: 99 km^{2} (38 sq mi)
- Basin countries: Italy
- Surface area: 1.1 km^{2} (0.42 sq mi)
- Average depth: 18.6 m (61 ft)
- Max. depth: 70.5 m (231 ft)
- Water volume: 20,500,000 m^{3} (720,000,000 cu ft)
- Residence time: 0.4 years
- Surface elevation: 944 m (3,097 ft)

Lake Ancipa is a reservoir in the Province of Enna and the Province of Messina, Sicily, Italy. At an elevation of 944 m, its surface area is 1.1 km². It has an average depth of 70.5m, and was created in the 1950s. It is currently used for drinking water and irrigation, but was formerly used for electricity.
