= Peter Townsend (RAF officer) =

British World War II flying ace (1914–1995)

Group Captain Peter Townsend CVO DSO DFC & Bar
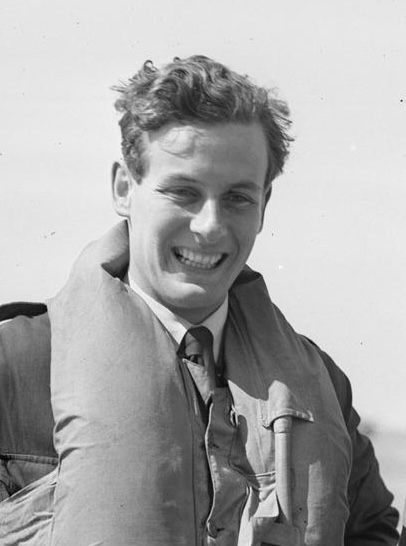
- Townsend in 1940
- Born: 22 November 1914; Rangoon, Burma, British India (now Yangon, Myanmar)
- Died: 19 June 1995 (aged 80); Saint-Léger-en-Yvelines, France
- Burial place: Saint-Léger-en-Yvelines
- Spouses: Rosemary Pawle (m. 1941; div. 1952) Marie-Luce Jamagne (m. 1959)
- Children: 5
- Military career
- Allegiance: United Kingdom
- Branch: Royal Air Force
- Service years: 1933–1955
- Rank: Group Captain
- Commands: RAF West Malling (1943–44); No. 605 Squadron RAF (1942); RAF Drem (1942); No. 85 Squadron RAF (1940–41)
- Conflicts: Second World War: Battle of Britain
- Awards: Commander of the Royal Victorian Order; Distinguished Service Order; Distinguished Flying Cross & Bar; Mentioned in Despatches

Group Captain Peter Wooldridge Townsend (22 November 1914 – 19 June 1995) was a British Royal Air Force officer, flying ace, courtier, and author. He served with distinction during the Second World War and, in 1944, was appointed equerry to King George VI, before later becoming comptroller of Queen Elizabeth the Queen Mother's household. Townsend became widely known for his relationship with Princess Margaret, the younger sister of Queen Elizabeth II, which attracted significant public and political attention in the 1950s.

He married twice and had five children. After leaving the Royal Household, he served as air attaché in Brussels and later pursued a successful writing career. He died in France in 1995 and has since been portrayed in the Netflix series The Crown.

== Early life ==
Peter Wooldridge Townsend was born on 22 November 1914 in Rangoon, Burma, to Lieutenant Colonel Edward Copleston Townsend, of the British Indian Army, and his wife, Gladys, daughter of Herbert Hatt-Cook of Hartford Hall, Cheshire. At the time of their marriage, his father was 20 years older than his bride.

The Townsend family, originally from Devon, traditionally sent its sons into the Church or the armed forces. Townsend was one of six children, with two brothers and three sisters. (One brother, Philip, was awarded the DSO while serving with the 6th Gurkha Rifles, and one sister, Stephanie, married Arthur Gaitskell, brother of Hugh Gaitskell.)

From 1928 to 1932, Townsend was educated at Haileybury and Imperial Service College, then an all-boys private school.

== RAF career ==
Townsend joined the Royal Air Force in 1933 and trained at RAF Cranwell. He was commissioned a pilot officer on 27 July 1935. On graduation, he was posted to No. 1 Squadron RAF at RAF Tangmere, flying the Hawker Fury biplane fighter. In 1936, he was transferred to No. 36 Squadron RAF in Singapore, where he flew the Vickers Vildebeest torpedo bomber.

He was promoted to flying officer on 27 January 1937, and returned to Tangmere later that year as a member of No. 43 Squadron RAF. Townsend was promoted to flight lieutenant on 27 January 1939.

In his memoir, Townsend described No. 605 Squadron's arrival at Tangmere shortly before the outbreak of war. He wrote:

Things hummed at Tangmere Cottage, just opposite the guard room, where [605's commanding officer John Willoughby de Broke and his wife Rachel] kept open house. There we spent wild evenings, drinking, singing, dancing to romantic tunes ... we danced blithely, relentlessly towards catastrophe ... With one chance in five of survival – not counting the burnt and the wounded – only a handful of us would come through.

The first enemy aircraft to crash on English soil during the Second World War fell to fighters from RAF Acklington in Northumberland on 3 February 1940, when three Hurricanes of 'B' flight, No. 43 Squadron, shot down a Luftwaffe Heinkel He 111 of 4./KG 26 near Whitby. The pilots were Flight Lieutenant Townsend, Flying Officer "Tiger" Folkes, and Sergeant Herbert Hallowes. Townsend claimed two further He 111s on 22 February and 8 April, and a sixth share on 22 April. Enemy aircraft had previously been shot down in 1939 over Scotland's Scapa Flow naval base during the Luftwaffe's first raid on Britain.

Townsend was awarded the Distinguished Flying Cross (DFC) in April 1940:

Flight Lieutenant Peter Wooldridge Townsend (33178) In April 1940, whilst on patrol over the North Sea, Flight Lieutenant Townsend intercepted and attacked an enemy aircraft at dusk and after a running fight shot it down. This is the third success obtained by this pilot and in each instance he has displayed qualities of leadership, skill and determination of the highest order, with little regard for his own safety.

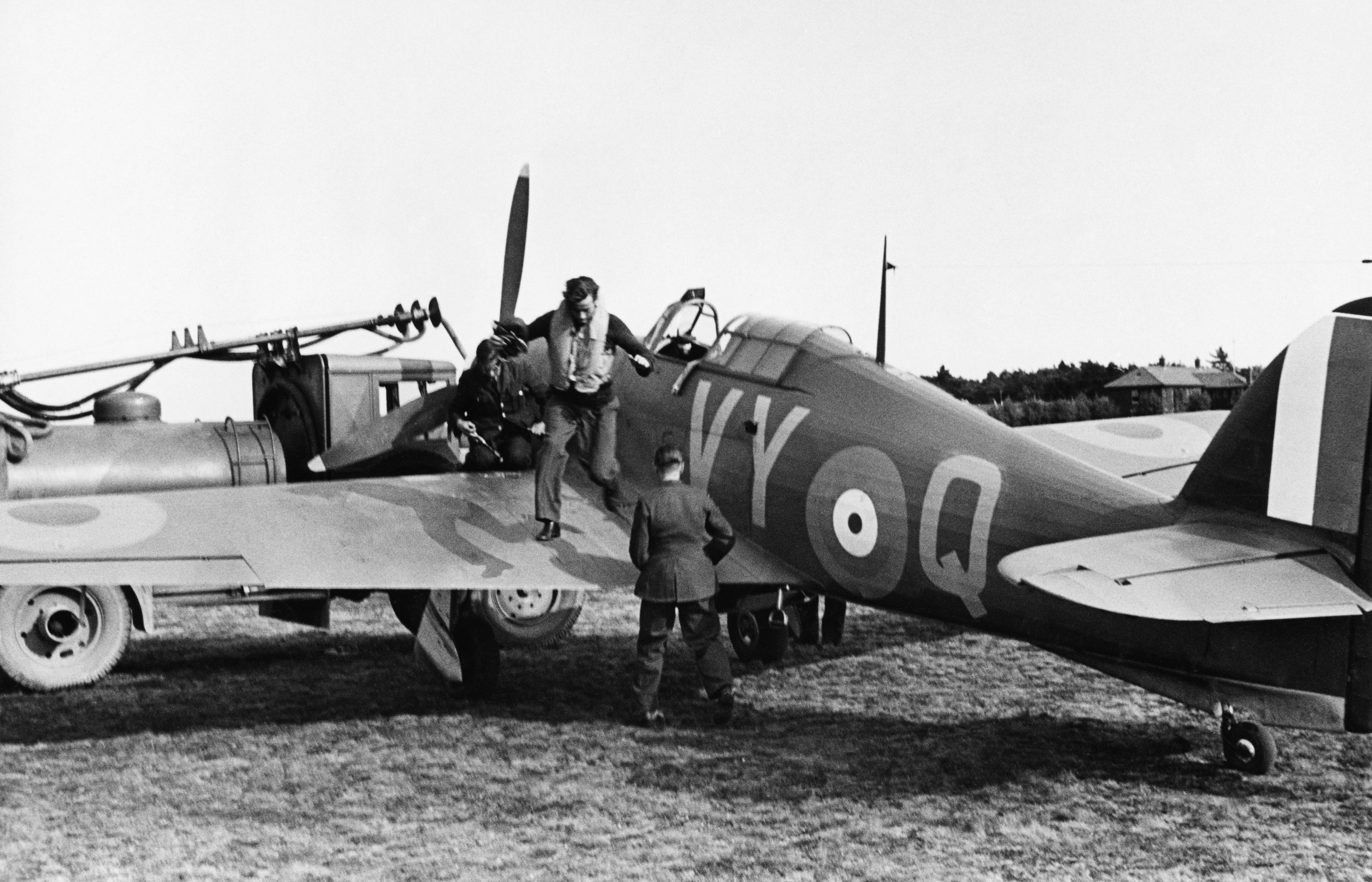
Squadron Leader Townsend of No. 85 Squadron RAF exits his Hawker Hurricane at RAF Castle Camps, July 1940

By May 1940, Townsend was regarded as one of the most capable squadron leaders of the Battle of Britain. He served throughout the battle as commanding officer of No. 85 Squadron RAF, flying Hawker Hurricanes. On 11 July 1940, Acting Squadron Leader Townsend, flying Hurricane VY-K (P2716), intercepted a Dornier Do 17 of KG 2 and severely damaged it, forcing the bomber to crash-land at Arras. Return fire ruptured the Hurricane's coolant system, and Townsend ditched 20 miles (32 km) from the English coast, where he was rescued by HM Trawler Cape Finisterre. He was mentioned in despatches the same month.

On 31 August, during combat with Messerschmitt Bf 110s over Tonbridge, Townsend was shot down and wounded in the left foot by a cannon shell that passed through the glycol tank and exploded in the cockpit. He continued to lead the squadron on the ground even after the wound resulted in the amputation of his big toe, and he returned to operational flying on 21 September. Townsend was promoted to the substantive rank of squadron leader on 1 September 1940.

A Bar to his DFC was awarded in early September 1940 for leading his squadron in protecting convoys during July and August 1940, personally shooting down four enemy aircraft, and leading his unit in destroying at least 10 more and damaging many others. The citation stated: "The success which has been achieved has been due to Squadron Leader Townsend's unflagging zeal and leadership."

Townsend oversaw the conversion of No. 85 Squadron to night operations at RAF Hunsdon in Hertfordshire in early 1941. In May 1941, by then an acting wing commander and credited with shooting down at least 11 enemy aircraft, he was awarded the Distinguished Service Order (DSO). His citation recorded that he had "displayed outstanding powers of leadership and organisation, combined with great determination and skill in air combat. By his untiring efforts he has contributed materially to the many successes obtained by his squadron."

Townsend was promoted to the temporary rank of wing commander on 1 December 1941. He later became commanding officer of RAF Drem in Scotland in April 1942 and subsequently commanded No. 611 Squadron RAF, a Spitfire unit. He later led No. 605 Squadron RAF, a night-fighter unit, and attended the staff college from October 1942. In January 1943, he was appointed commanding officer of RAF West Malling in Kent. His wartime record was nine aircraft destroyed, two shared, two "probables" and four damaged.

Claims by Flt Lt Peter Townsend during World War II air operations
Date	Location	Aircraft shot down
3 February 1940	Near Whitby, North Yorkshire	Heinkel He 111 (4./KG 26) – first enemy aircraft to crash on English soil
22 February 1940	North England patrol	Heinkel He 111 – claimed destroyed
8 April 1940	North England patrol	Heinkel He 111 – claimed destroyed
11 July 1940	Off Arras / English Channel	Dornier Do 17 – severely damaged, forced to crash‑land in France
11 August 1940	Thames Estuary region	Dornier Do 17 – destroyed (plus damaged Bf 110)
18 August 1940	Thames Estuary region	Two Messerschmitt Bf 109 and one Bf 110 – three fighters destroyed
26 August 1940	Over England	Shared in destruction of two Dornier Do 17s
28 August 1940	Over England	Messerschmitt Bf 109 – destroyed
29 August 1940	Over England	Messerschmitt Bf 109 – destroyed

In 1944, Townsend was appointed temporary equerry to King George VI; he had previously served as the future king's flight instructor in the 1930s. Later that year, the appointment was made permanent, and he served until 1953, when he became Extra Equerry, an honorary office he held until his death. He ended his wartime service with the temporary rank of wing commander and was promoted to the permanent rank of wing commander on 1 January 1949.

In August 1950, Townsend was appointed deputy Master of the Household, and after the death of George VI in 1952 he was moved to the post of comptroller to Queen Elizabeth the Queen Mother. He was promoted to group captain on 1 January 1953, and retired from the Royal Household later that year.

Townsend served as air attaché in Brussels from 1953 to 1956.

== Personal life ==
On 17 July 1941, Townsend married (Cecil) Rosemary Pawle (1921–2004). They had two sons, Giles (1942–2015) and Hugo (b. 1945). The family lived at Adelaide Cottage during the 1940s. The younger son, Hugo, married Yolande, Princess of Ligne, daughter of Antoine, 13th Prince of Ligne, and Alix, Princess of Ligne (née Princess Alix of Luxembourg, daughter of Charlotte, Grand Duchess of Luxembourg). Townsend and Pawle divorced in 1952.

After the divorce, Townsend and Princess Margaret decided to marry. He had first met her during his service as an equerry to her father, George VI. Divorce carried significant social stigma at the time, and the Church of England did not permit the remarriage of divorced persons if their former spouse was still living. Their relationship was considered particularly sensitive because Margaret's sister, Queen Elizabeth II, was the Church's supreme governor.

When news of the relationship appeared in the press, the government posted Townsend to the British Embassy in Brussels as air attaché. On 31 October 1955, Margaret issued a public statement formally ending the relationship:

I have been aware that, subject to my renouncing my rights of succession, it might have been possible for me to contract a civil marriage. But, mindful of the Church's teachings that Christian marriage is indissoluble, and conscious of my duty to the Commonwealth, I have resolved to put these considerations before others.

The BBC interrupted its scheduled radio programme to broadcast the statement.

In 1959, aged 45, Townsend married 20-year-old Marie-Luce Jamagne, a Belgian national he had met the previous year. They had two daughters and one son. Their younger daughter, Isabelle, became a commercial model for the fashion designer Ralph Lauren in the late 1980s and early 1990s. Isabelle and her family later renovated and lived at Le Moulin de la Tuilerie in Gif-sur-Yvette, a former residence of the Duke and Duchess of Windsor.

Townsend and Margaret remained in occasional contact by correspondence in the years that followed. Their final meeting took place in 1992 at Kensington Palace, where they had lunch before walking together in the palace garden.

== Later life and death ==
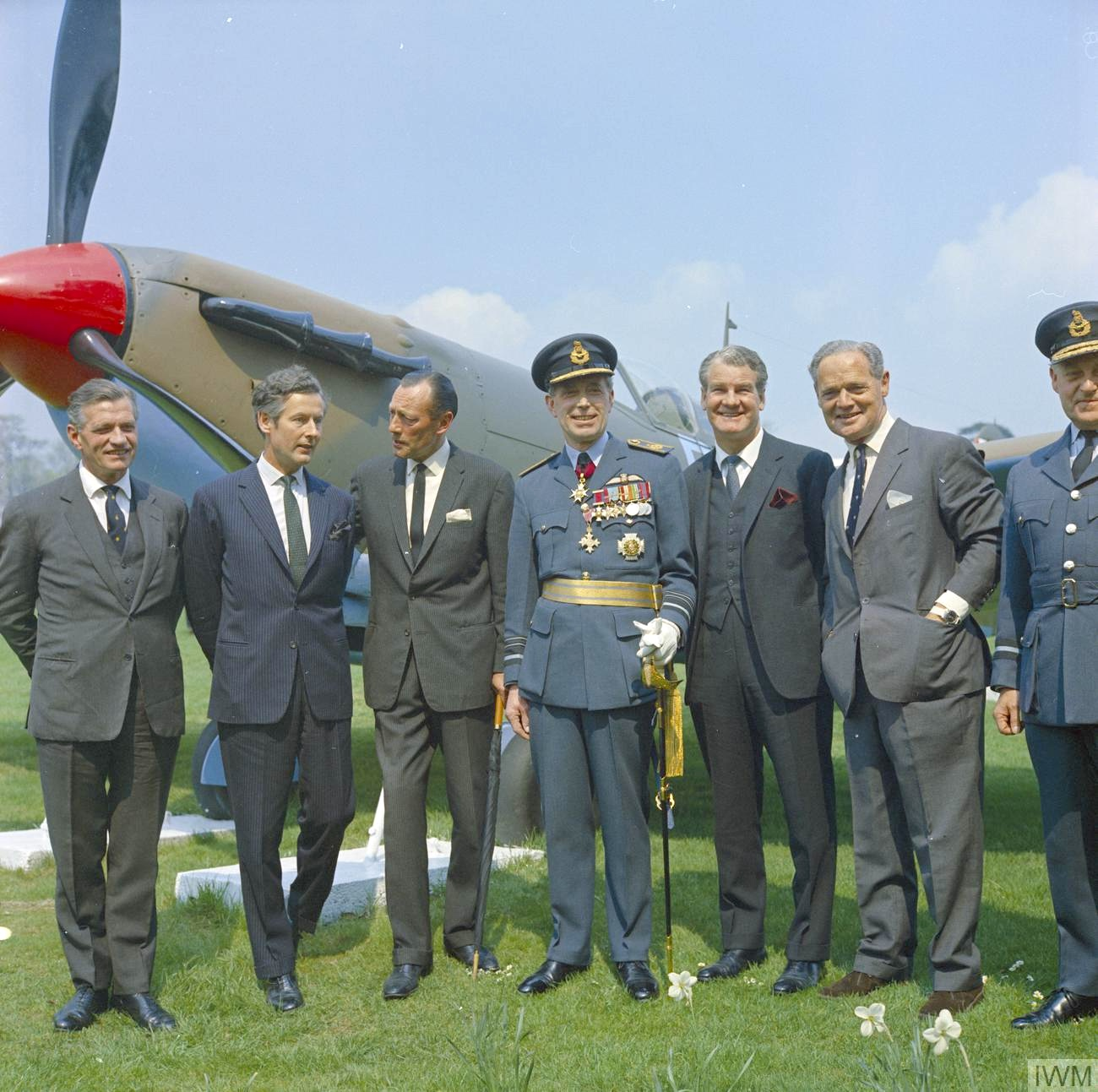
Townsend (second from left) with several other World War II aces, 1968

Townsend spent much of his later life writing non-fiction. His books include Earth My Friend (about travelling alone around the world by car and boat in the mid‑1950s), Duel of Eagles (on the Battle of Britain), The Odds Against Us (also published as Duel in the Dark, about night-fighter operations against Luftwaffe bombers in 1940–1941), The Last Emperor (a biography of George VI), The Girl in the White Ship (about a young Vietnamese refugee who survived the sinking of her boat in the late 1970s), The Postman of Nagasaki (on the atomic bombing of Nagasaki), and Time and Chance (an autobiography). He also wrote numerous shorter articles and contributed to other works.

Townsend later served as a director of one of Gerald Carroll's Carroll Group companies.

He was one of several military advisers for the film Battle of Britain (1969), and he appeared in the PBS documentary The Windsors: A Royal Family (1994).

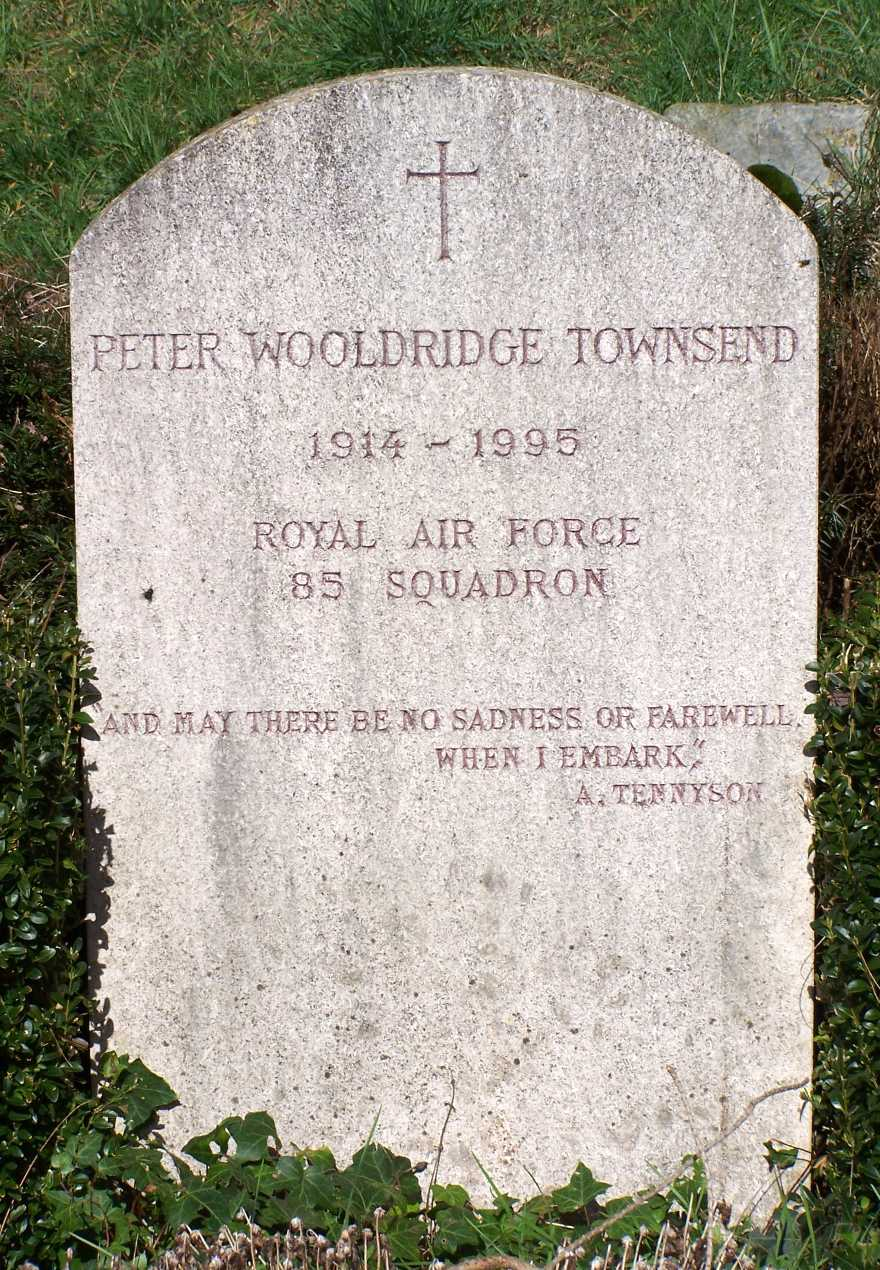
Townsend's grave in the churchyard of Saint-Léger-en-Yvelines, France.

Townsend died of stomach cancer in Saint-Léger-en-Yvelines, France, on 19 June 1995, aged 80. The Independent wrote in its obituary that "He developed, too, a perceptible sense of relief that things turned out the way they did", noting that "for men like Mark Phillips and Princess Margaret's eventual husband Antony Armstrong-Jones, [marrying into the royal family] turned out to be an almost impossible undertaking".

== Decorations and awards ==
In 2002, a sculpture of Townsend, designed by Guy Portelli, was erected at Townsend Square, part of the Kings Hill development on the former RAF West Malling airfield.

Townsend received several high‑level British decorations for gallantry and distinguished service during the Second World War, as well as foreign honours from Belgium and the Netherlands. His medals reflect a career of active operational flying and service to the Royal Family.

- Royal Victorian Order – Commander (CVO)
- Distinguished Service Order
- Distinguished Flying Cross and Bar
- 1939–1945 Star with Battle of Britain Clasp
- Air Crew Europe Star
- Defence Medal
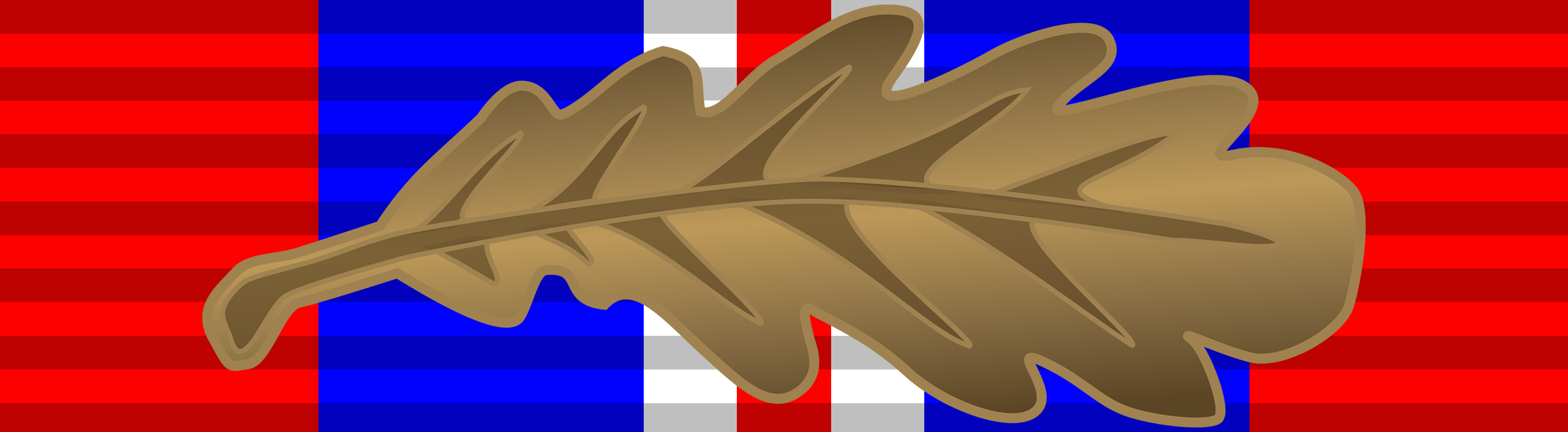
- War Medal 1939–1945 with Mentioned in Despatches oak leaf
- Queen Elizabeth II Coronation Medal
- Queen Elizabeth II Silver Jubilee Medal

Foreign honours

- Officer of the Order of the Crown (Belgium)
- Queen Juliana Inauguration Medal
- Commander of the Order of Orange-Nassau

Townsend's group of medals was sold at auction in June 2021 for £260,000 through the Dix Noonan Webb auction house.

== In popular culture ==
Townsend is portrayed by Aden Gillett in the Channel 4 television film The Queen's Sister, Tristan Sturrock in the Channel 4 miniseries The Queen, and Ben Miles, Timothy Dalton, and Hamish Riddle in the Netflix television series The Crown.

== Selected works ==
- Earth, my friend. Coward-McCann. 1960. OCLC 1329573.
- Duel of Eagles. Simon and Schuster. 1970. ISBN 0-671-20641-9. OCLC 119851.
- The last emperor: an intimate account of George VI and the fall of his empire. Simon and Schuster. 1976. ISBN 0-671-22328-3. OCLC 2284054.
- Time and Chance: an autobiography. Methuen. 1978. ISBN 0-458-93710-X. OCLC 4307096.
- The Girl in the White Ship. Holt, Rinehart, and Winston. 1983. ISBN 0-03-057787-X. OCLC 8387613.
- The Postman of Nagasaki. Collins. 1984. ISBN 0-00-217067-1. OCLC 12010257.
- Duel in the Dark: The Sequel to Duel of Eagles. Harrap. 1986. ISBN 0-245-54247-7. OCLC 16801897. (also published as Duel in the Dark: A Fighter Pilot's Story of the Blitz by Arrow books in 1988)
- The Odds Against Us: Memoirs of Aerial Combat at Night During the Battle of Britain. William Morrow and Co. 1987. ISBN 978-0688042905. (a larger scale republication of Duel in the Dark)
