= Marquess Camden =

Title in the Peerage of the United Kingdom

Marquessate of Camden
- Arms: Quarterly 1st & 4th, Sable, on a Fess Argent, between three Elephant’s Heads erased Argent, three Mullets Sable (Pratt); 2nd, Sable, a Chevron between three Spear Heads Argent, the points embrued (Jeffreys), 3rd, Gules, an Inescutcheon Vair, between eight Cross-Crosslets Or (Molesworth). Crests: Dexter: An Elephant’s Head erased Argent (Pratt); Sinister: a Dragon’s Head erased Vert, holding in the mouth a Sinister Hand couped at the wrist Gules, and about the neck a Chain and pendant therefrom a Portcullis Or (Jeffreys). Supporters: Dexter: a Griffin Sable, beaked and clawed Gules, gorged with a Collar Argent, charged with three Mullets Sable; Sinister: a Lion Or, armed and langued Gules, gorged with a Collar Argent, charged with three Mullets Sable.
- Creation date: 7 September 1812
- Created by: The Prince Regent (acting on behalf of his father King George III)
- First holder: John Pratt, 2nd Earl Camden
- Present holder: David Pratt, 6th Marquess Camden
- Heir apparent: James Pratt, Earl of Brecknock
- Subsidiary titles: Earl Camden; Earl of Brecknock; Viscount Bayham; Baron Camden
- Status: Extant
- Motto: JUDICIUM PARIUM AUT LEX TERRÆ (The judgement of my peers, or the law of the land)

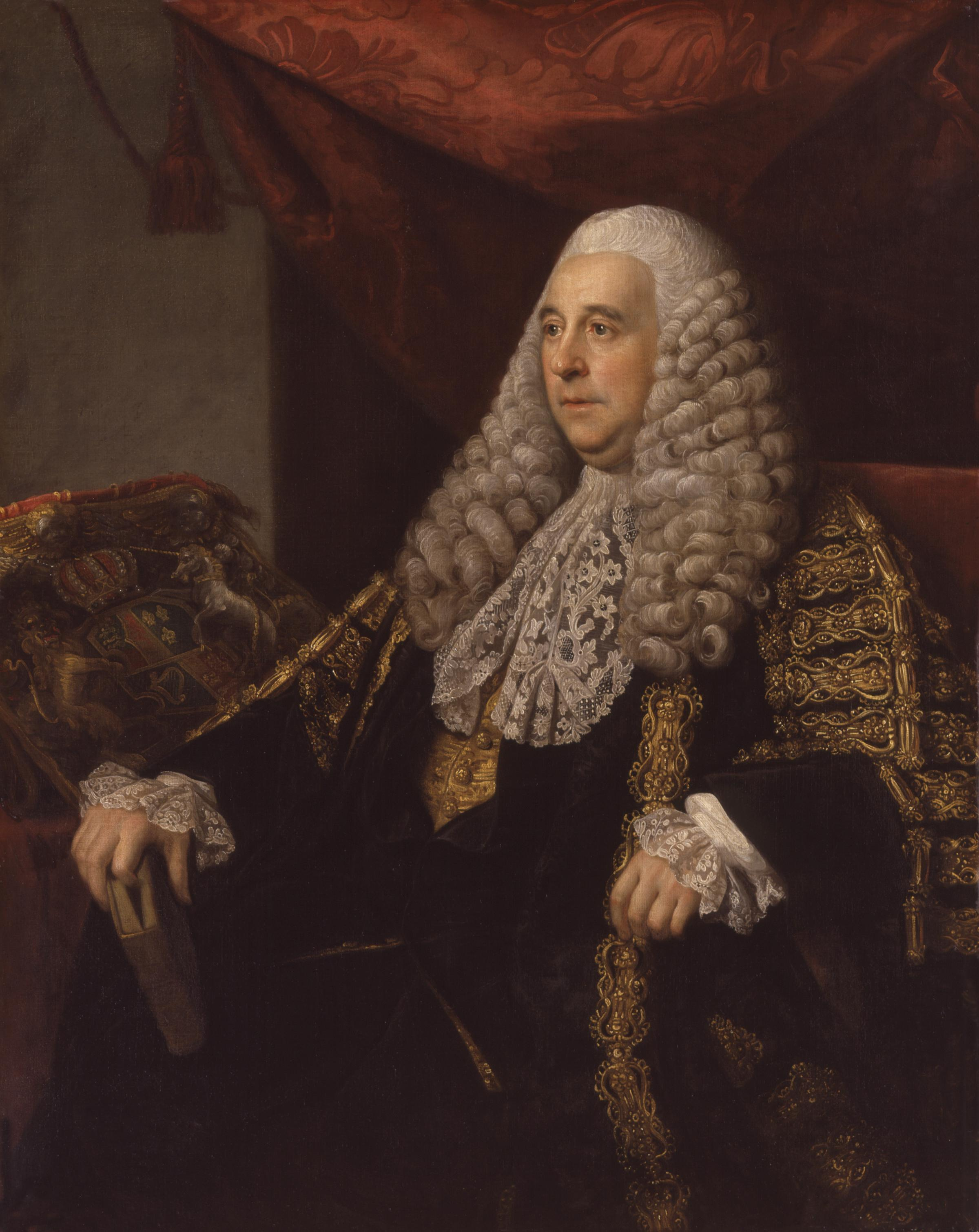
Charles Pratt, 1st Earl Camden, by Nathaniel Dance-Holland

Marquess Camden is a title in the Peerage of the United Kingdom. It was created in 1812 for the politician John Pratt, 2nd Earl Camden. The Pratt family descends from Sir John Pratt, Lord Chief Justice from 1718 to 1725. His third son from his second marriage, Sir Charles Pratt, was also a prominent lawyer and politician and served as Lord Chancellor between 1766 and 1770. In 1765 he was raised to the Peerage of Great Britain as Baron Camden, of Camden Place in the County of Kent, and in 1786 he was further honoured when he was created Viscount Bayham, of Bayham Abbey in the County of Kent, and Earl Camden. These titles are also in the Peerage of Great Britain. Lord Camden was married to Elizabeth, daughter of Nicholas Jeffreys, of The Priory, Brecknockshire, in Wales.

Their son, the second Earl, was a politician and notably served as Lord Lieutenant of Ireland and as Lord President of the Council. In 1812 he was created Earl of the County of Brecknock (usually shortened to Earl of Brecknock) and Marquess Camden. His son, the second Marquess, represented Ludgershall, Bath and Dunwich in the House of Commons and also served as Lord Lieutenant of Brecknockshire. In 1835 Lord Camden was called to the House of Lords through a writ of acceleration in his father's junior title of Baron Camden. His son, the third Marquess, briefly sat as a Member of Parliament for Brecon in 1866, before he succeeded his father and took his seat in the House of Lords. On his early death, the titles passed to his three-month-old son, the fourth Marquess. He was notably Lord Lieutenant of Kent from 1905 to 1943. As of 2017 the peerages are held by his grandson, the sixth Marquess, who succeeded his father in 1983.

Lord Michael Pratt was a younger son of the fifth Marquess.

Camden Town in London is named after Charles Pratt, 1st Earl Camden, and the elephant from the arms of Marquess Camden is therefore present in the crest in the coat of arms of the London Borough of Camden.

The family seat is Wherwell House, near Andover, Hampshire. Until the early 1980s, the family also owned the Bayham Abbey Estate, near Lamberhurst, Kent.

== Baron Camden (1765) ==
- Charles Pratt, 1st Baron Camden (1713–1794) (created Viscount Bayham and Earl Camden in 1786)

== Earls Camden (1786) ==
- Charles Pratt, 1st Earl Camden (1713–1794)
- John Jeffreys Pratt, 2nd Earl Camden (1759–1840) (created Marquess Camden and Earl of the County of Brecknock in 1812)

== Marquesses Camden (1812) ==
- John Jeffreys Pratt, 1st Marquess Camden (1759–1840)
- George Charles Pratt, 2nd Marquess Camden (1799–1866)
- John Charles Pratt, 3rd Marquess Camden (1840–1872)
- John Charles Pratt, 4th Marquess Camden (1872–1943)
- John Charles Henry Pratt, 5th Marquess Camden (1899–1983)
- David George Edward Henry Pratt, 6th Marquess Camden (b. 1930)

The heir apparent is the present holder's son James William John Pratt, Earl of Brecknock (b. 1965)

== Family tree and Line of succession ==
Family tree of the Marquess Camden

John Pratt; 1657–1725
Baron Camden, 1765; Earl Camden and Viscount Bayham, 1786
Charles Pratt; 1714–1794; 1st Earl Camden, etc.
Marquess Camden and Earl of (the County of) Brecknock, 1812
John Jeffreys Pratt; 1713–1794; 1st Marquess Camden, etc., 2nd Earl Camden, etc.
George Charles Pratt; 1799–1866; 2nd Marquess Camden, etc., 3rd Earl Camden, etc.
John Charles Pratt; 1840–1872; 3rd Marquess Camden, etc., 4th Earl Camden, etc.
John Charles Pratt; 1872–1943; 4th Marquess Camden, etc., 5th Earl Camden, etc.
John Charles Pratt; 1899–1983; 5th Marquess Camden, etc., 6th Earl Camden, etc.
David George Henry Pratt b. 1930; 6th Marquess Camden, etc., 7th Earl Camden, etc.
James William John Pratt b. 1965 styled Earl of Brecknock

Line of succession
- John Pratt, 4th Marquess Camden (1872–1943)
  - John Pratt, 5th Marquess Camden (1899–1983)
    - David Pratt, 6th Marquess Camden (b. 1930)
      - (1). James William John Pratt, Earl of Brecknock (b. 1965)
        - (2). Herbert Jonathan Pratt, Viscount Bayham (b. 2026)
  - Lord Roderic Arthur Neville Pratt (1915–1997)
    - (3). Adrian John Charles Pratt (b. 1952)
