= John Pratt, 4th Marquess Camden =

British peer

The Most Honourable The Marquess Camden GCVO TD JP DL
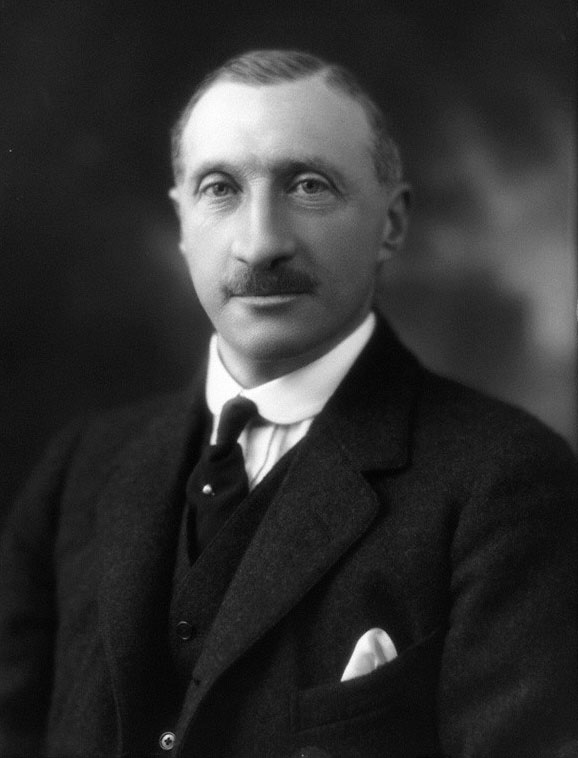

Lord-Lieutenant of Kent
- In office 5 June 1905 – 15 December 1943
- Monarchs: Edward VII; George V Edward VIII; George VI
- Preceded by: The Earl Stanhope
- Succeeded by: The Lord Cornwallis

Personal details
- Born: 9 February 1872 Eaton Square, London, England
- Died: 15 December 1943 (aged 71)
- Spouse: Lady Joan Neville (m. 1898)
- Education: Trinity College, Cambridge

John Charles Pratt, 4th Marquess Camden GCVO TD JP DL (9 February 1872 – 15 December 1943), briefly styled Earl of Brecknock in 1872, was a British peer.

== Background and education ==
Camden was born at Eaton Square, London, the third but only surviving son of John Pratt, 3rd Marquess Camden, by Lady Clementina Augusta, daughter of George Spencer-Churchill, 6th Duke of Marlborough. He was a half-first cousin of Lord Randolph Churchill on his mother's side. He succeeded to the marquessate at the age of two months on the early death of his father, and was subsequently educated at Eton and Trinity College, Cambridge.

He owned 17,000 acres in Kent, Brecon and Sussex.

== Career ==
In 1905 Camden was appointed Lord-Lieutenant of Kent, a position he held until his death. He fought in the First World War as a Major in the West Kent Yeomanry Cavalry, where he was awarded the Territorial Decoration. He was also a deputy lieutenant of Sussex between 1894 and 1922 as well as a justice of the peace for the county. He was appointed a Knight Grand Cross of the Royal Victorian Order in 1933. From 1942 to 1943 he was commodore of the prestigious Royal Yacht Squadron.

== Family ==
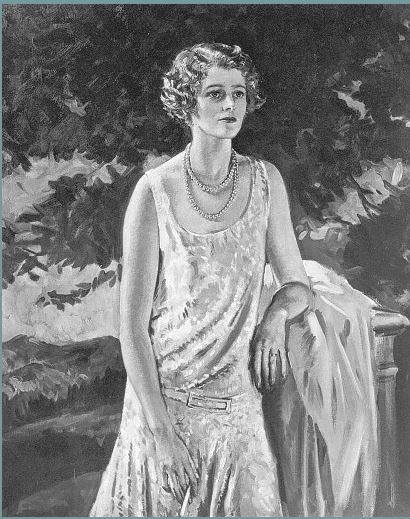
Countess of Brecknock, ca 1929

Lord Camden married Lady Joan Marion, daughter of Henry Nevill, 3rd Marquess of Abergavenny, in 1898. They had two sons and two daughters. He died in December 1943, aged 71, and was succeeded in the marquessate by his eldest son, John. The Marchioness Camden died in July 1952, aged 74.

His daughter Lady Fiona Pratt married firstly Sir Gerard Fuller, 2nd Baronet and secondly Edward Agar, 5th Earl of Normanton, becoming the mother of the third Baronet and of Shaun Agar, 6th Earl of Normanton.

Honorary titles
Preceded by The Earl Stanhope	Lord-Lieutenant of Kent; 1905–1943	Succeeded by The Lord Cornwallis
Peerage of the United Kingdom
Preceded by John Charles Pratt	Marquess Camden; 1872–1943	Succeeded by John Charles Henry Pratt
