= Simeto =

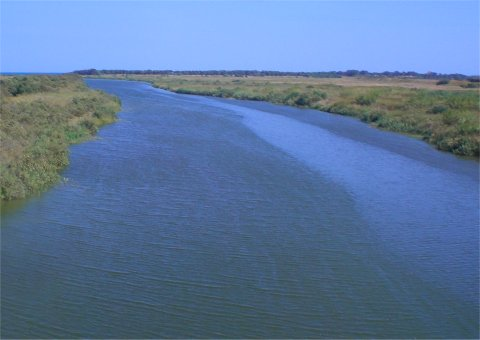
- The river's mouth

Location
- Country: Italy

Physical characteristics
- Source
  - location: Nebrodi Mountains
  - elevation: about 1,700 m (5,600 ft)
- Mouth: Ionian Sea
  - coordinates: 37.4003°N 15.0890°E
- Length: 116 km (72 mi)
- Basin size: 4,029 km^{2} (1,556 sq mi)
- Discharge
  - average: 25 m^{3}/s (880 cu ft/s)

The Simeto (Italian pronunciation: [siˈmɛːto]; Sicilian: Simetu; Latin: Symaethus; Greek: Σύμαιθος) is a 113-kilometre (70 mi) long river in Sicily, southern Italy. At 116 kilometres (72 mi), it is the second longest river on the island after the Salso (also known as Southern Imera), but the most important in terms of watershed (4,029 km^{2} (1,556 mi^{2})). It flows through the province of Enna and the province of Catania.

Its source is located near Bronte, from the union of several streams of the Nebrodi Mountains. After receiving its first affluent, the Troina, the river starts running southwards into a spectacular canyon of lava from eruptions of Mount Etna. Near Adrano, Simeto constitutes the boundary between the province of Catania and that of Enna, and receives the Salso, then flows near Paternò.

Simeto's final course is slower and twisting, being all included in the plain of Catania; its last confluences are with the Dittaino and the Gornalunga, before flowing into the Ionian Sea south of the metropolitan area of Catania.
