= Cerami =

Cerami Cirami (Sicilian)
- Comune
- Comune di Cerami
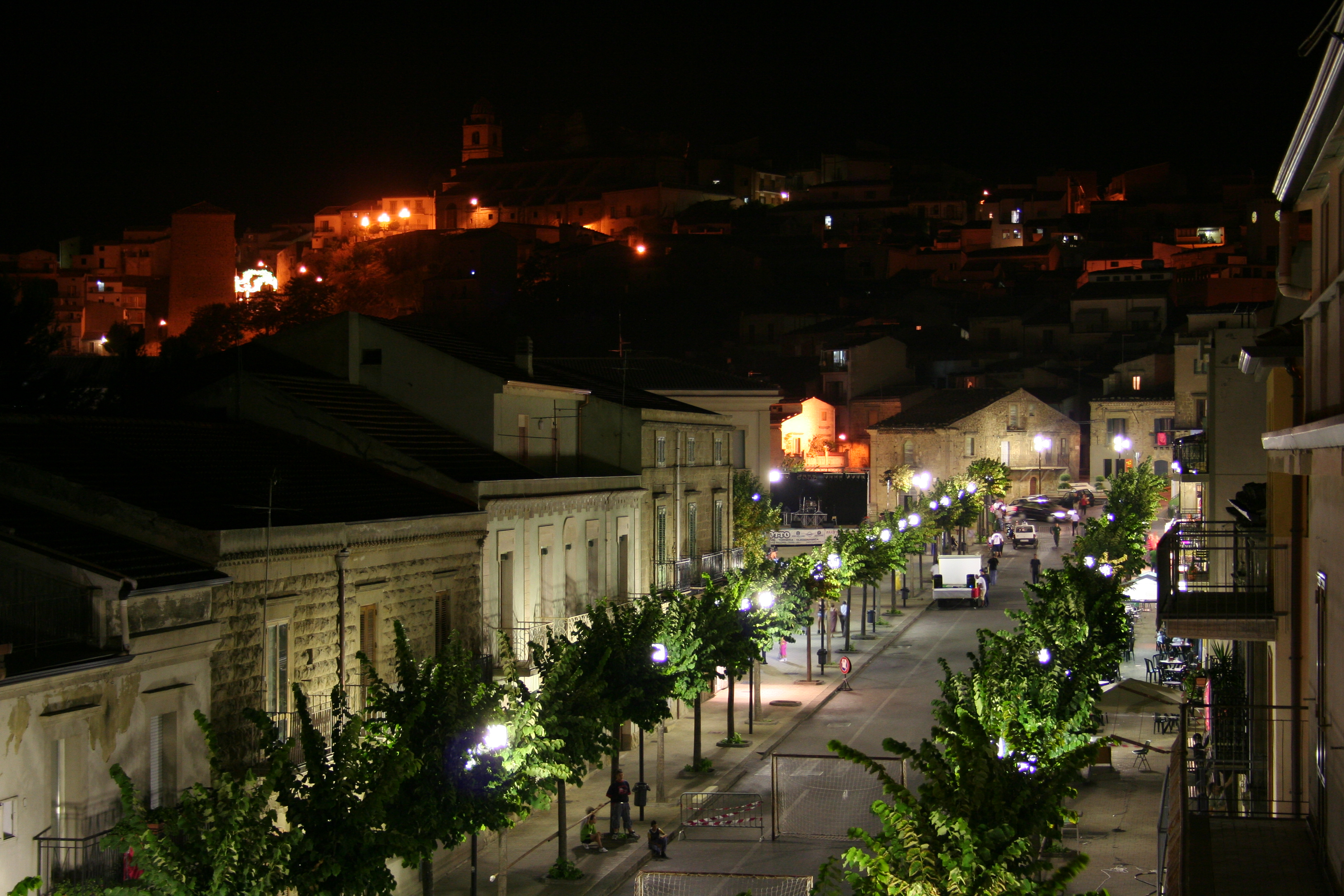
- View of Cerami

- Coat of arms

- Location within Italy Location within Sicily
- Coordinates: 37°49′N 14°30′E
- Country: Italy
- Region: Sicily
- Province: Enna (EN)

Government
  - Mayor: Silvestro Chiovetta

Area
  - Total: 95.05 km^{2} (36.70 sq mi)
- Elevation: 970 m (3,180 ft)

Population (2026)
  - Total: 1,867
  - Density: 19.64/km^{2} (50.87/sq mi)
- Demonym: Ceramesi
- Time zone: UTC+1 (CET)
  - Summer (DST): UTC+2 (CEST)
- Postal code: 94010
- Dialing code: 0935
- Patron saint: Saint Sebastian
- Website: Official website

Cerami (Sicilian: Cirami) is a town and comune (municipality) in the province of Enna the autonomous island region of Sicily in Italy. It has 1,867 inhabitants.

The town itself is perched on a mountaintop 1,000 metres (3,300 ft) above sea level. A river also named Cerami flows through this area.

Cerami produces cereals, olives, grapes, and almonds. It also is known for cattle breeding and sheep herding. It holds a Cattle Fair during the month of August.

== History ==
Cerami was founded by the Greeks as part of Magna Graecia in the fourth century BC. The name Cerami derives from the Greek term Keràmion, that means terracotta. The territory hosts several archeological areas, such as the Raffo district where remains of a Greek necropolis were discovered.

A hilltop town, Cerami was the location of a major battle between Normans and Muslims in 1063, during the Norman conquest of the Island by Roger I of Sicily son of Tancred of Hauteville. According to historian Goffredo Malaterra, after being besieged in the neighboring town of Troina for four months, Roger and 136 ferocious Norman knights took to the field of Cerami and faced approximately 50,000 Muslim soldiers. The apparition of St. George was said to have materialized on a white horse carrying the sign of the cross on his lance and charging into the enemy where their array was the most dense. Malaterra claims the Normans slaughtered 35,000 of the enemy. According to English historian Edward Gibbon, even accounting for 5 or 6 men at arms accompanying each Norman knight into battle, and even accounting for the Normans' superior martial training, the victory was either miraculous or fabulous. A similar trope is associated with the miraculous appearance of St James the Moorslayer (Santiago Matamoros) during the putative Battle of Clavijo in Spain. Nevertheless, the Normans went on to capture the island.

The current community rose approximately in the 11th century, and it belonged to the Count of Policastro, Simone d'Altavilla, and then to his son Manfredi. It was conquered by the Arnaldo family, and was subsequently bestowed to the Antiochia family, thus to the Manna noblemen. In 1336, the town was acquired by noblemen Rosso, who beheld it until the abolition of the feudal rights.

During the Second World War, the hamlet briefly served as headquarters for the U.S. 1st Infantry Division as it prepared to assault German strongpoints located north and south of Troina.

== Demographics ==
As of 2026, the population is 1,867, of which 48.9% are male, and 51.1% are female. Minors make up 12.1% of the population, and seniors make up 28.2%.

Historical population

Year	Pop.	±%
1861	4,402	—
1871	5,056	+14.9%
1881	5,031	−0.5%
1901	4,470	−11.2%
1911	3,851	−13.8%
1921	3,873	+0.6%
1931	3,812	−1.6%
1936	3,869	+1.5%

Year	Pop.	±%
1951	4,652	+20.2%
1961	4,371	−6.0%
1971	3,427	−21.6%
1981	3,182	−7.1%
1991	3,100	−2.6%
2001	2,462	−20.6%
2011	2,150	−12.7%
2021	1,867	−13.2%

Source: ISTAT

=== Immigration ===
As of 2025, immigrants make up 9.7% of the total population. The 5 largest foreign countries of birth are Argentina, Germany, Australia, France, and Tunisia.

== Main sights ==
The most important landmarks are:

- Sant'Ambrogio - 16th-century Mother church (chiesa madre) of the town, dedicated to Saint Ambrosius, preserving a statue of the Madonna and Child by Antonello Gagini
- Madonna del Carmelo - gothic architecture church
- San Benedetto della Badia -baroque Church once attached to a functioning Benedictine Abbey. The church houses a Byzantine icon of the Madonna.
