= Saint-Léger-en-Yvelines =

- Commune
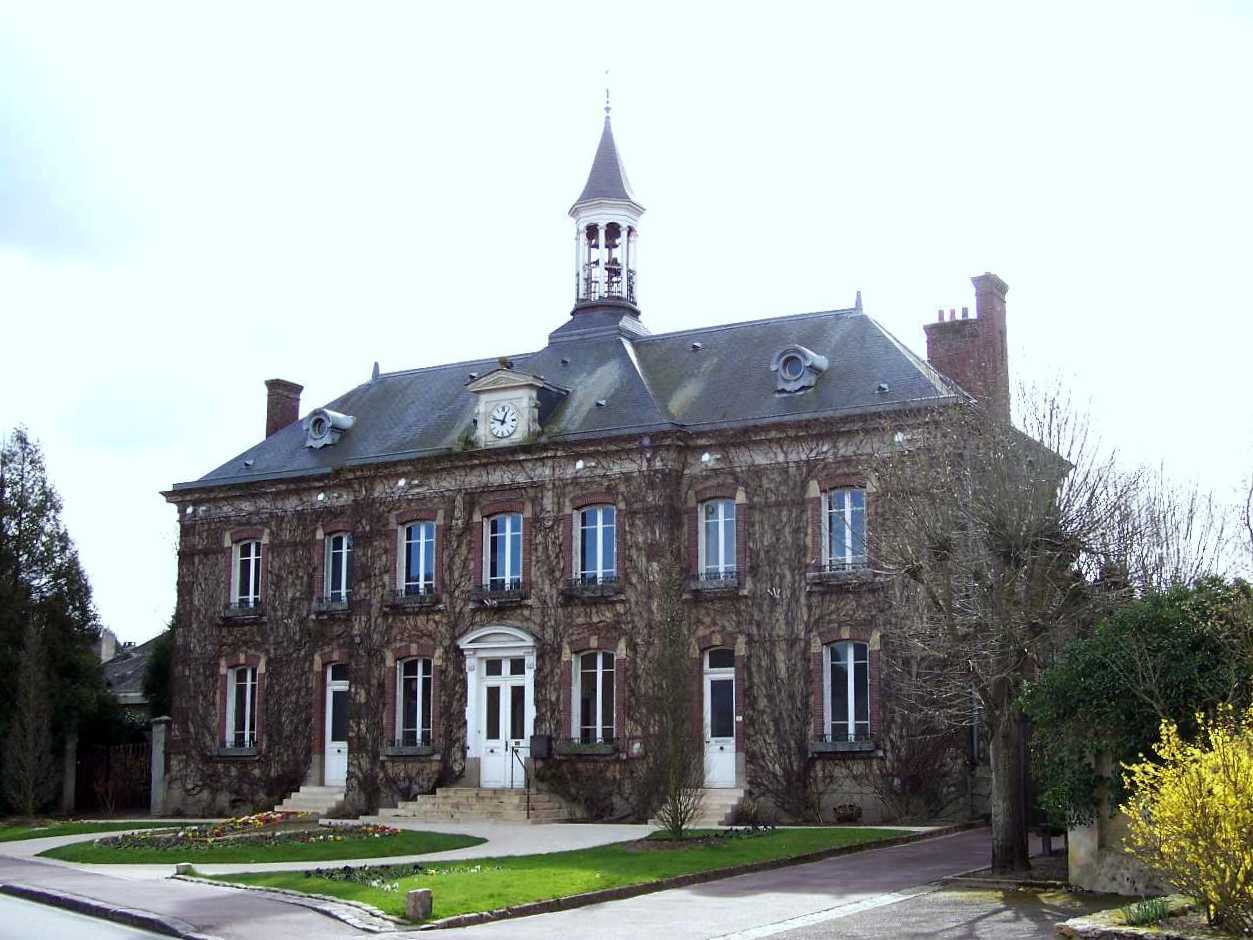
- Town hall

- Coat of arms
- Location of Saint-Léger-en-Yvelines
- Location within France Location within Île-de-France (region)
- Coordinates: 48°43′20″N 1°45′59″E
- Country: France
- Region: Île-de-France
- Department: Yvelines
- Arrondissement: Rambouillet
- Canton: Rambouillet
- Intercommunality: CA Rambouillet Territoires

Government
  - Mayor (2024–2026): Jean-Pierre Ghibaudo
- Area^{1}: 34.52 km^{2} (13.33 sq mi)
- Elevation: 150 m (490 ft)
- Highest elevation: 186 m (610 ft)
- Lowest elevation: 112 m (367 ft)
- Population (2023): 1,468
  - Density: 42.53/km^{2} (110.1/sq mi)
- Demonym: Léodégariens
- Time zone: UTC+01:00 (CET)
  - Summer (DST): UTC+02:00 (CEST)
- INSEE/Postal code: 78562 /78610
- Website: saint-leger-en-yvelines.fr
- ^{1} French Land Register data, which excludes lakes, ponds, glaciers > 1 km^{2} (0.386 sq mi or 247 acres) and river estuaries.

Saint-Léger-en-Yvelines (French pronunciation: [sɛ̃ leʒe ɑ̃.n‿ivlin]) is a commune in the Yvelines department in the Île-de-France region in Northern France. It is situated southwest of Paris, part of the Communauté d'agglomération Rambouillet Territoires. As of 2023, the population of the commune was 1,468.

== Geography ==
The commune of Saint-Léger-en-Yvelines is in the centre of the department and in the heart of the Forest of Rambouillet. Rambouillet itself, the administrative centre of the arrondissement, is some 11 km (6.8 mi) to the south-east, and the prefecture, Versailles, is 37 km (23 mi) to the north-east.

The commune is a rural one, and 94% of the unbuilt area is covered by forest, complemented by some cultivated clearings, primarily to the south of the village.

== See also ==
- Communes of the Yvelines department
