= David Pratt, 6th Marquess Camden =

British hereditary peer (born 1930)

David George Edward Henry Pratt, 6th Marquess of Camden (born 13 August 1930), is a British peer. He was a member of the House of Lords from 1983 to 1999.

== Early life ==
The son of John Pratt, 5th Marquess of Camden, and his wife Marjorie Minna Jenkins, he was educated at Eton College and was commissioned into the Scots Guards.

== Career ==
He was a director of Clive Discount Company between 1958 and 1969.

On 22 March 1983, he succeeded as Marquess Camden (1812), Earl of Camden (1786), Earl of Brecknock (1812), Viscount Bayham of Bayham Abbey (1786), and Baron Camden of Camden Place (1765).

== Personal life ==
On 20 April 1961, he married Virginia Ann Finlaison, daughter of Francis Harry Hume Finlaison; they were divorced in 1984, having had three children:

- Lady Samantha Caroline Pratt (born 1964)
- James William John Pratt, Earl of Brecknock (born 1965)
- Lord Jonathan Bruce Charles Pratt (1970–1976)

In 2003, Lord Camden was living at Wherwell House, Andover, Hampshire.

== Notes ==
Peerage of the United Kingdom
Preceded by John Charles Henry Pratt	Marquess Camden; 1983–	Incumbent
