= Bronte, Sicily =

Bronte
- Comune
- Comune di Bronte
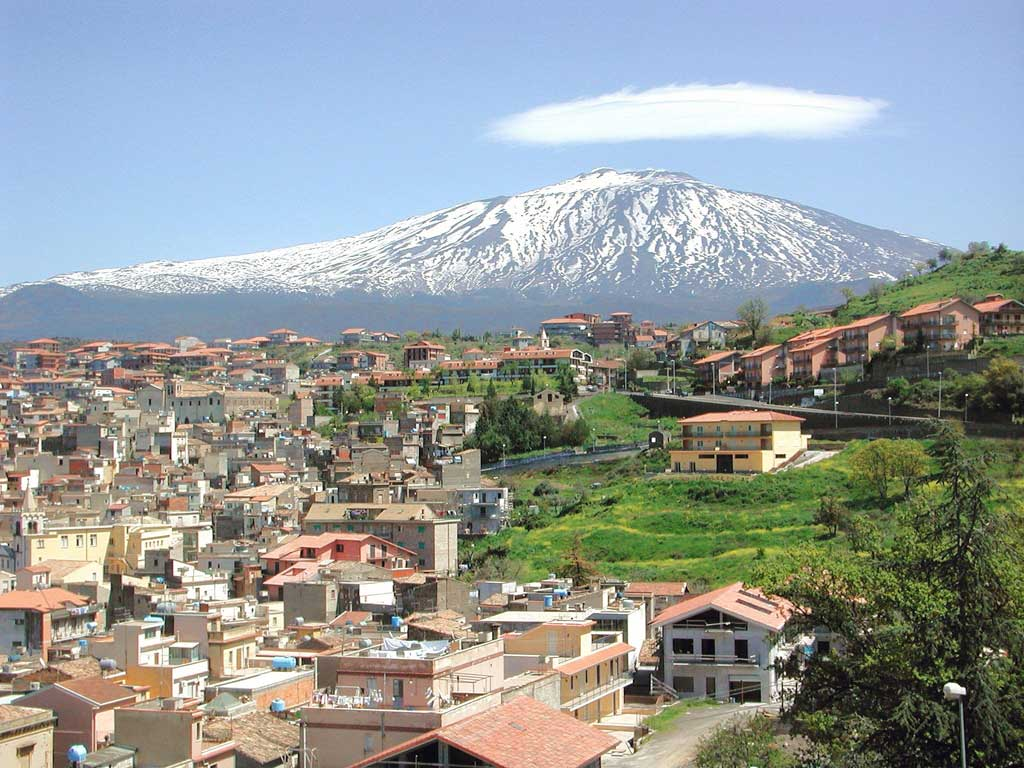

- Coat of arms

- Location within Italy Location within Sicily
- Coordinates: 37°47′N 14°50′E
- Country: Italy
- Region: Sicily
- Metropolitan city: Catania (CT)

Government
  - Mayor: Giuseppe Gullotta

Area
  - Total: 249 km^{2} (96 sq mi)
- Elevation: 760 m (2,490 ft)

Population (30 April 2017)
  - Total: 19,074
  - Density: 76.6/km^{2} (198/sq mi)
- Demonym: Brontesi
- Time zone: UTC+1 (CET)
  - Summer (DST): UTC+2 (CEST)
- Postal code: 95034
- Dialing code: 095
- Patron saint: St Blaise and the Madonna Annunziata
- Saint day: 3 February
- Website: www.comune.bronte.ct.it

Bronte (Arbëreshë Albanian: Brontë) is a town and comune in the Metropolitan City of Catania, in Sicily, southern Italy. The town is situated approximately 16 kilometres (10 mi) west-northwest from Mount Etna, on the side of the valley of the Simeto river, and about 32 kilometres (20 mi) west from Giarre and Sicily's eastern coast. Bronte's economy relies mostly on farming, particularly of pistachio nuts. The town was settled and historically inhabited by the Arbëreshë community.

== History ==
Bronte's name derives from that of one of the Cyclopes in Greek mythology and it means "The Thunderer". Legend has it that the Cyclopes lived under Mount Etna.

In 1520, Charles V united the twenty-four hamlets of the surrounding area, which formed the town of Bronte. Mount Etna nearly destroyed the town three times, in 1651, in 1832, and finally in 1843.

In 1799, King Ferdinand III created Bronte as a Duchy, and rewarded admiral Horatio Nelson with the title of Duke for the help he had provided him in suppressing the revolution in Naples and so in recovering his throne. As well as being made a Duke, Nelson was given as a fief the Castello di Maniace, which at the time was the remains of a Benedictine monastery. The Castle passed into the Bridport family when the 1st Viscount Bridport married the then Duchess of Bronte, who was Admiral Nelson's niece. The Bridports continued to live in the castle until 1982 when the current Viscount sold the property to the Comune of Bronte. Today it is a local tourist attraction in Maniace, and has been restored (including the recreation of ceramic-tiled floors) by the Comune. It is built in the style of an English country house (with formal garden) set in the hills of eastern Sicily.

In 1860, during Giuseppe Garibaldi's Expedition of the thousand, there was a citizen's revolt. Sicilian peasants had hoped for – and did not get from Garibaldi – reforms from the restrictive conditions imposed by noble landowners. This hope had been reinforced by Garibaldi's decree of 2 June 1860 that land would be re-distributed. The southerners revolted in several localities including at Bronte, where 16 were massacred. Buildings were also set on fire, including the theatre, the municipal archive, other buildings, and many houses. On 5 August 1860, Garibaldi sent general Girolamo ("Nino") Bixio with two battalions of bersaglieri to restore order in Bronte. Bixio reached Bronte the next day and repressed the riots. On 9 August, trials where hastily set up, which only lasted for four hours and led to the summary executions of six people. The facts and details of the riots and its repression have been the subject of reinterpretation and debate.

== Landmarks ==
- Castello Nelson – a museum about 7 miles (11 km) north from the town centre. Originally an abbey (Santa Maria di Maniace) dating to 1174, it has a Gothic-Norman portico and contains a Byzantine icon which, according to tradition, was painted by St Luke.
- Church of the Annunziata (1535)
- Collegio Capizzi (1774–1779)
- Cascata di Balze (underground waterfall), close to Castello Nelson.

== Twin towns ==
- (Republic of Ireland) Drogheda, Ireland
- Damghan, Iran

== Sources ==
- Pratt, Michael (2006); Nelson's Duchy: A Sicilian Anomaly, Spellmount Publishers Ltd. ISBN 186227326X.
- Fleming, Ian. Thunderball. (1961) Penguin Group. ISBN 0-141-02828-9. P-076.
