= Centuripe ware =

Class of ancient polychome painted Sicilian pottery

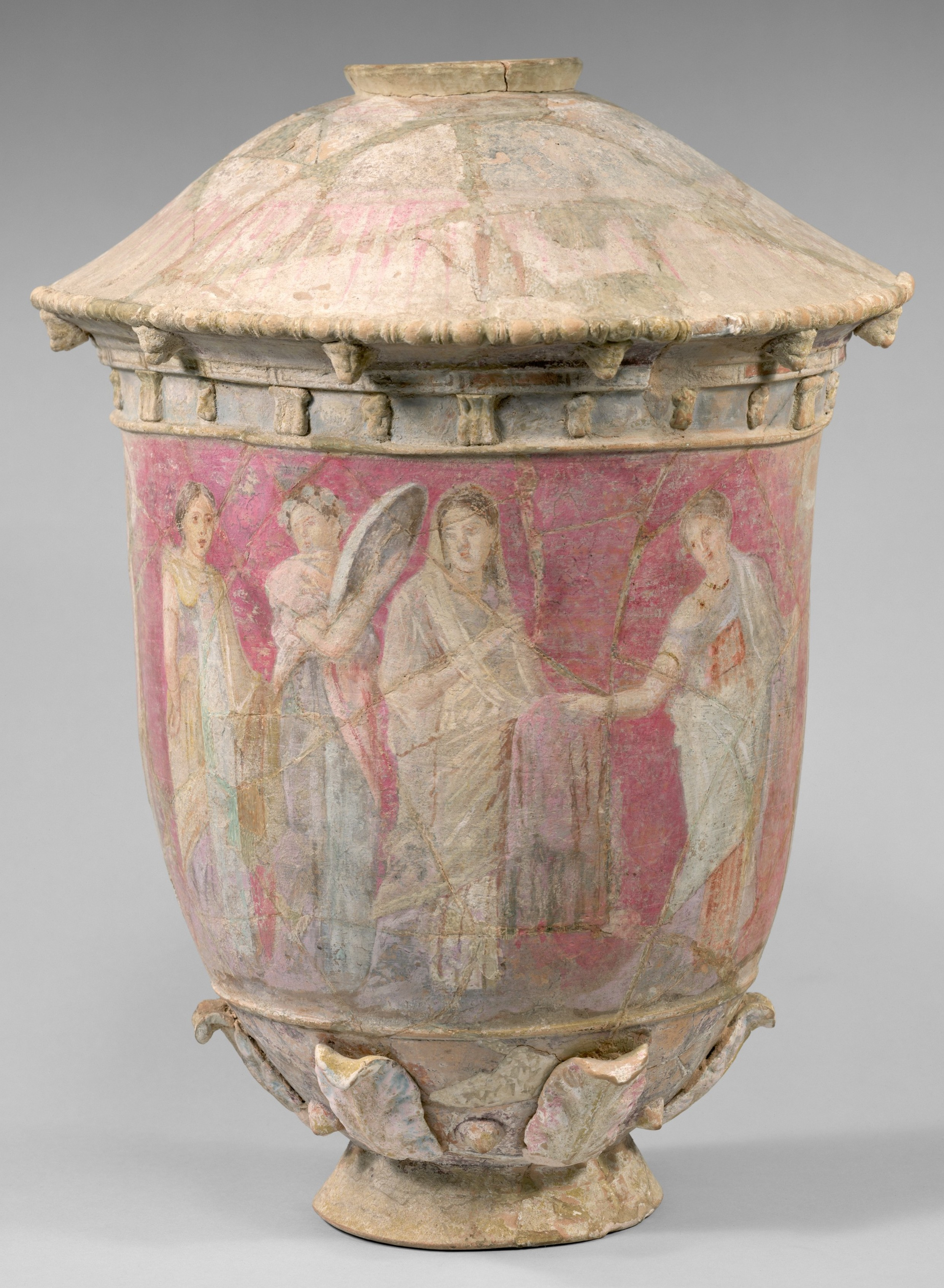
Vase in the Metropolitan Museum of Art, showing a bride and attendants.

Centuripe ware, or East Sicilian polychrome ware, or the Centuripe Class of vase, is a type of polychrome Sicilian vase painting from the 3rd and 2nd centuries BC. It is rare, with only some 50 examples known. They have been described, arguably rather unjustly, as "smothered in ornamental colors and shaped too elaborately", an example of Hellenistic "Middle-class taste [that] was often cloying and hideous, sometimes appealing."

The class is named after its first and main find location, Centuripe in Sicily; most other finds are also in Sicily, especially at Morgantina. There were probably a number of workshops in eastern Sicily making such wares. The painted vases were usually pyxides, lebetes and lekanes in their shapes. Centuripe wares are among the last vases with significant figurative painting in the long tradition of the pottery of Ancient Greece.

== Potting ==
The vessels are large, measuring about 50 cm (20 in) in height on average. They are composed of separately made segments of orange clay, typically assembled as a single piece, so that lids cannot be lifted. Conversely other pieces, especially of the lekanis shape, are made in several pieces, making them equally impractical for use. Ornamental motifs, dominated by acanthus garlands and architectural friezes, as well as heads and busts, are modelled in three dimensions, usually by moulding, and applied to the surfaces. These probably reflect metalwork, now very rarely surviving, as well as architecture. The Morgantina treasure, found nearby and now returned from New York to Italy, includes good examples of comparable raised decoration in metal from the 3rd century.

== Painting ==
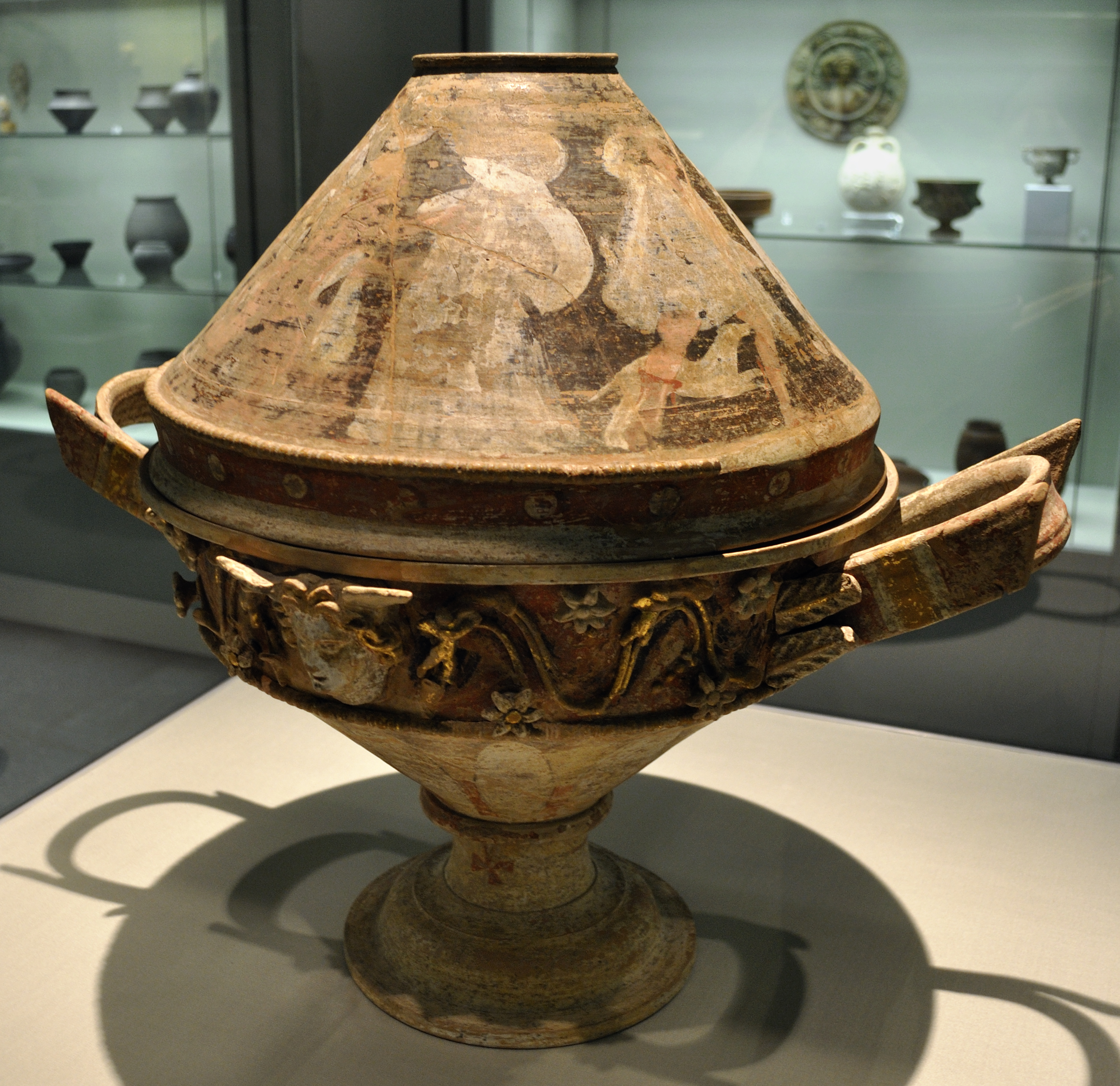
Lekanis in Düsseldorf

The paintings were only applied on one side, entirely using tempera paints applied after all firing. This is a significant difference from most other Greek vase-painting, although some later vases had added some painting after firing as well as the traditional fired ceramic painting, and Greek terracotta figurines were often painted in this way. The colours tend to be pastel shades, which can include white, pink, black, blue, yellow, red, gold, rarely also green. Pink, magenta, or red backgrounds are typical. As well as a main scene with a few figures, the ornamental zones are at least partly painted, and elements might be gilded. In the main scene, outlines were drawn in black after firing, a white ground applied within the areas to be fully painted, which allowed the lines still to be seen, and finally tempera paints applied.

The repertoire of figural subjects is limited virtually entirely to women, erotes and weddings. The few exceptions include scenes from the theatre and gods, mostly Dionysos. The painting can be sophisticated, with highlights modelling the forms and faces in three-quarters view, and the class is important for adding indirectly to our information about Hellenistic panel and wall painting, whose style the vases clearly drew upon. The vases have themselves been described as "vases that want to be wall-paintings". The condition in which the paintings have survived varies, with those excavated at Morgantina in very poor condition. An example in the Metropolitan Museum of Art, showing a wedding, is in very good condition, and often chosen to represent the class.

With tempera painting, and small pieces of clay ornament projecting from the body, they were far too fragile for any regular use, and it is thought they were either made as grave goods, or given as gifts to the bride on the occasion of a wedding, then kept as display pieces in the home, before being buried with their owners. They may also have been buried with unmarried women. Some are also found at temples, and were presumably votive gifts. The Dionysic scenes apparently relate to the Dionysian Mysteries, which were growing in importance in this period, in a form offering the hope of rebirth in the afterlife.

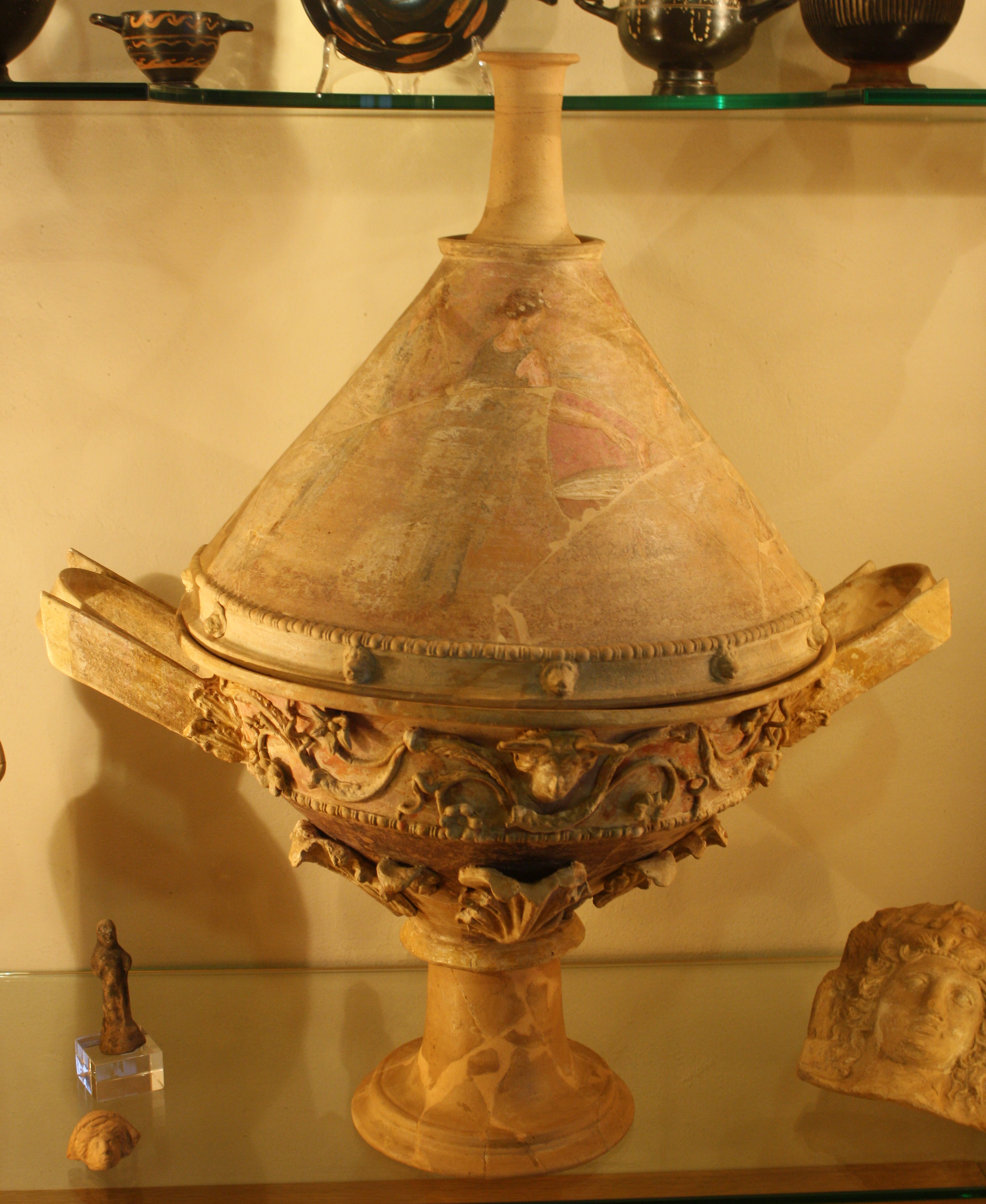
Lekanis in Legnano, with parts reconstructed.

The Metropolitan also has a 3rd-century lebes gamikos, a type of vase used as a wedding gift; this has a very basic form, and is painted with a female head. Indiana University Art Museum has a plaque painted with a woman's head in a similar technique. Centuripe was apparently also a centre of production of terracotta figurines, and has sometimes been called the Tanagra of Sicily.

== Findspots and dating ==
The finds from Centuripe itself have all apparently come from graves, though most earlier finds were illicitly excavated and so lacked proper archaeological provenances. Conversely, at Morgantina the finds are from temple sanctuaries (for female goddesses), with some fragments from houses.

Broad stylistic considerations always dated them to the 3rd and 2nd centuries BC. There has been considerable debate as to whether the undoubted 3rd-century production continued into the 2nd century. Late 20th-century thinking was that it did not, but newly published excavation work suggests that it did. Especially if this is the case, Centuripe wares come right at the end of significant figurative painting in the long tradition of the pottery of Ancient Greece.

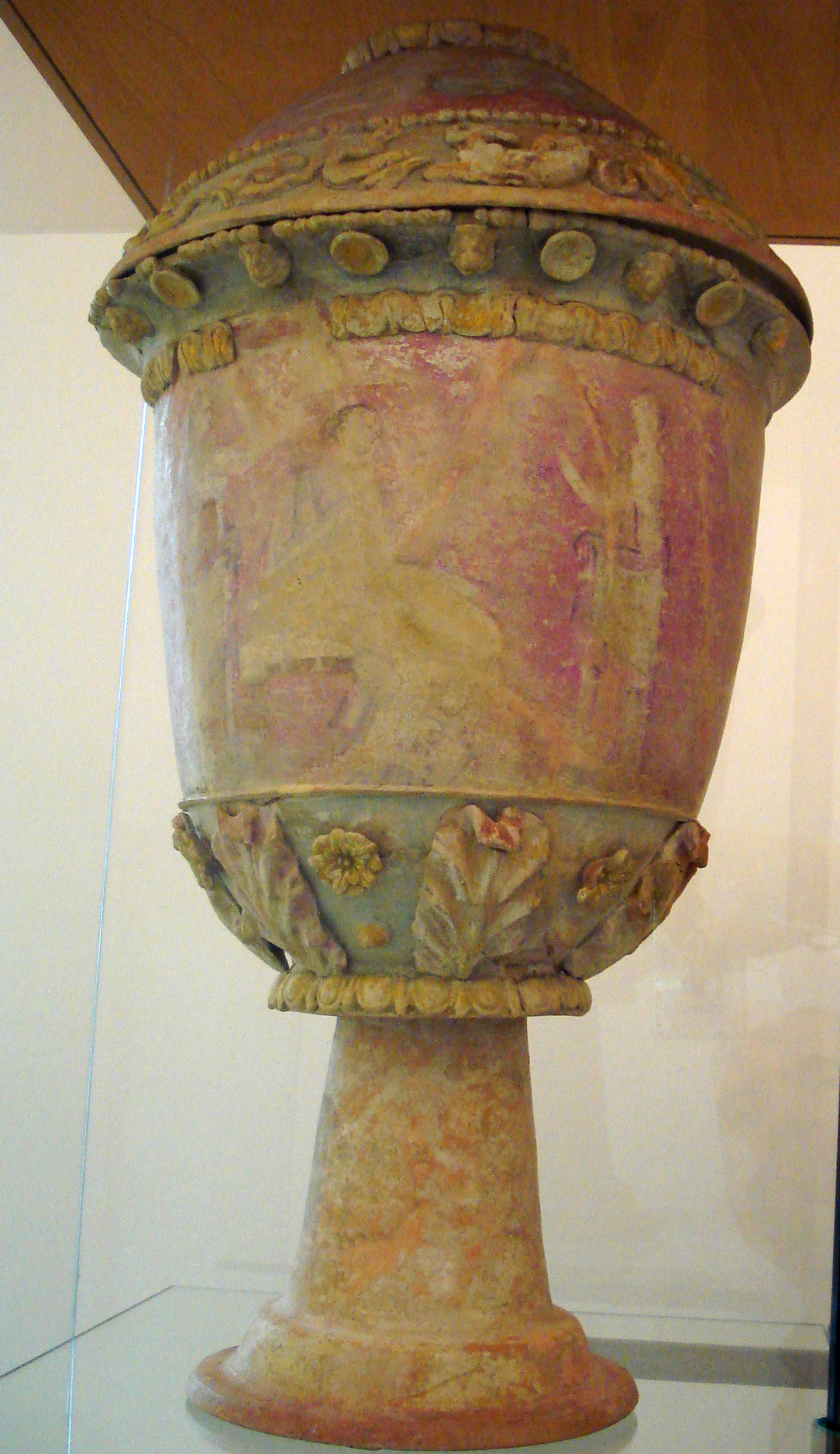
Centuripe vase in Palermo, 280–220 BC

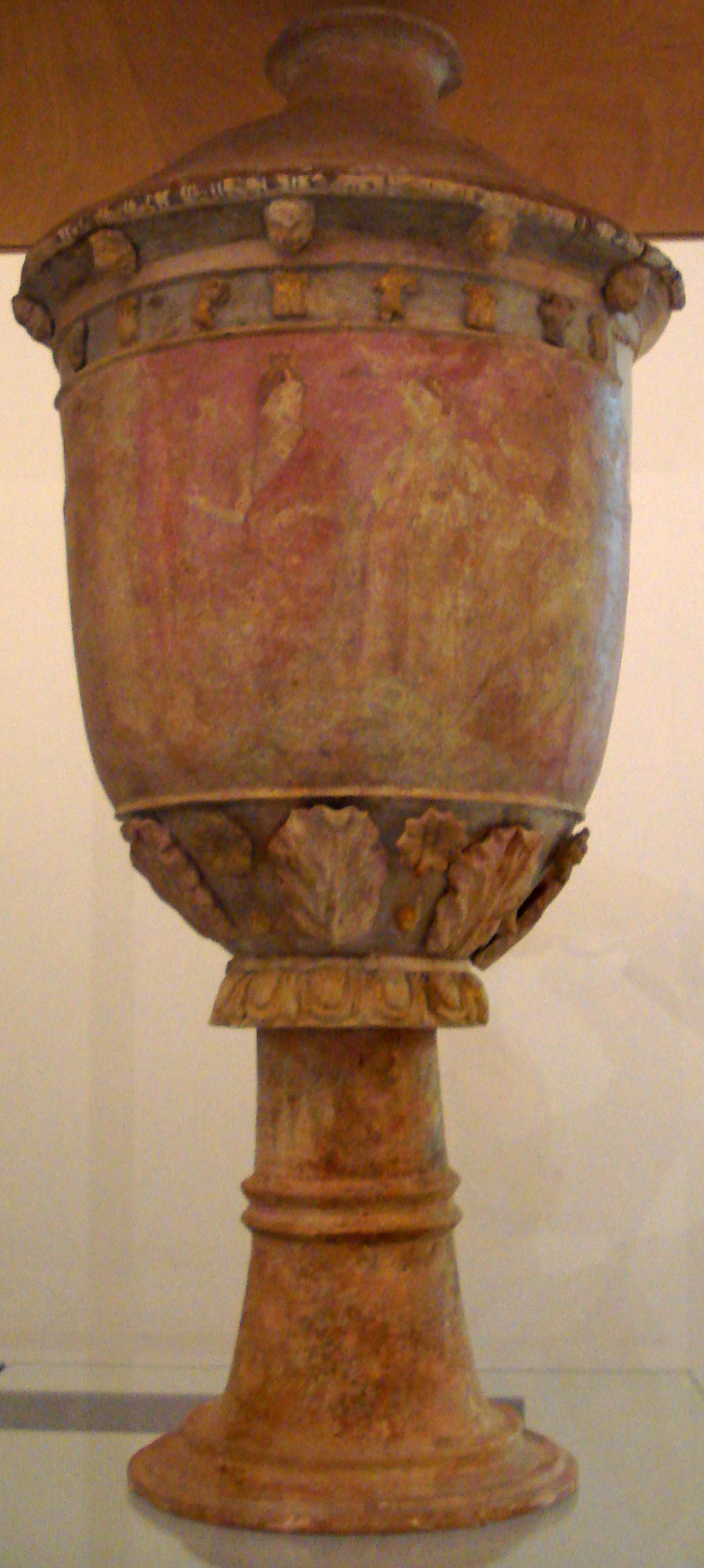
Another vase in Palermo

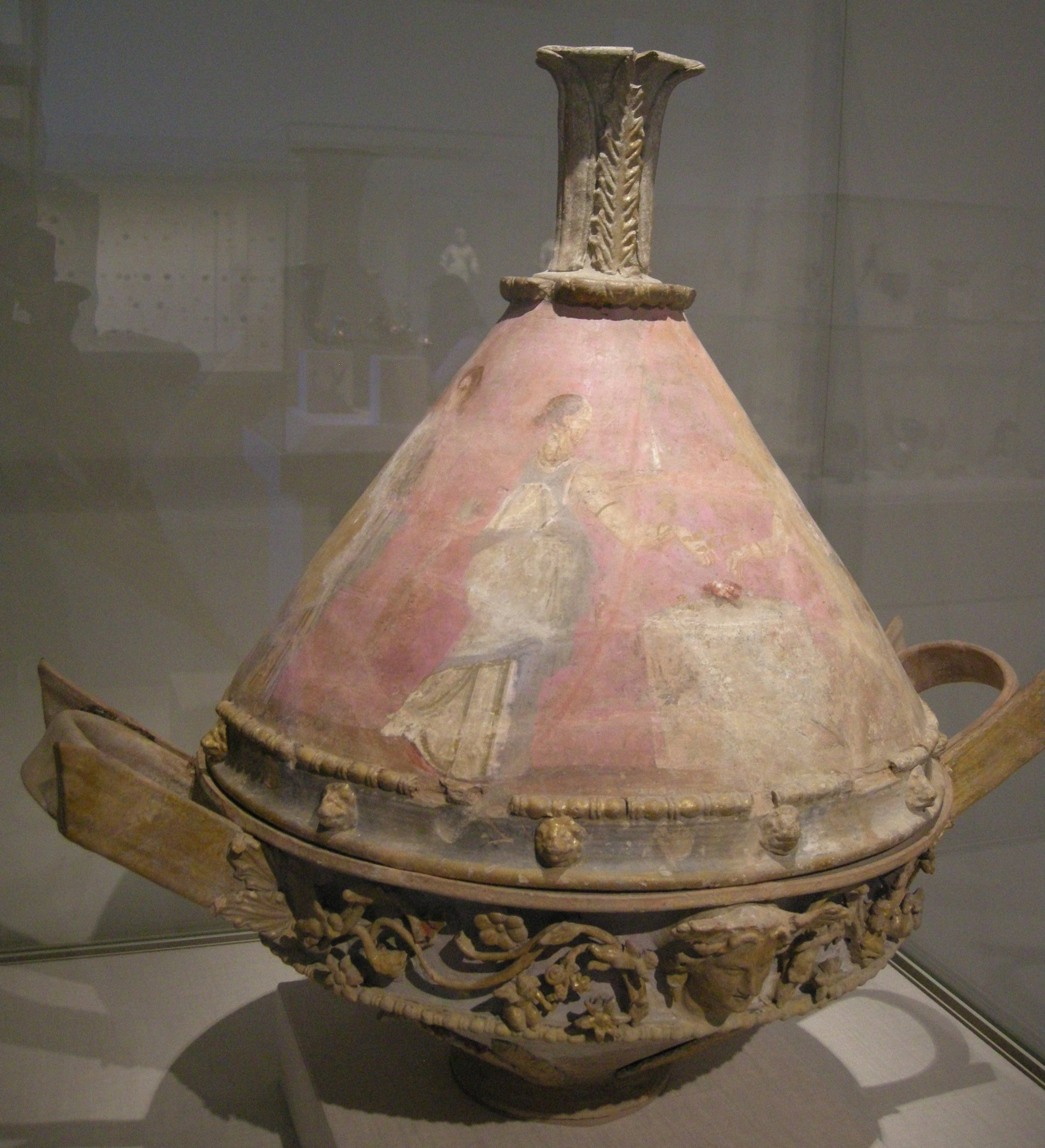
Lekanis with lid and finial, 2nd half of 3rd century BC
