= Ameselum =

Coordinates: 37°38′18″N 14°39′43″E

Ameselum (Greek: Ἀμήσελον) was an ancient town of Sicily, on the road between Centuripae (modern Centuripe) and Agyrium (modern Agira). The town was taken in 269 BCE by the forces of Hiero II of Syracusae.

== See also ==
Regalbuto
