= Profeta =

Profeta is an Italian surname. Notable people with the surname include:

- Antonino Profeta (born 1988), Italian footballer
- Carlo Profeta, acting capo in Domenico Cutaia's crew.
- Luca Profeta (born 1990), Italian footballer
- Ottavio Profeta (1890–1963), Italian poet
