= Santa Maria della Croce =

Santa Maria della Croce may refer to:

- Santa Maria della Croce, Crema, Roman Catholic sanctuary and minor basilica in Crema, in the Cremona Province of Lombardy, Italy
- Santa Maria della Croce, Regalbuto, Roman Catholic parish church located in Regalbuto, province of Enna, Sicily, Italy

== See also ==
- Santa Maria (disambiguation)
