= Archaeological Museum of Aidone =

Museum in Aidone, Enna, Sicily

Coordinates: 37.4135°N 14.4474°E

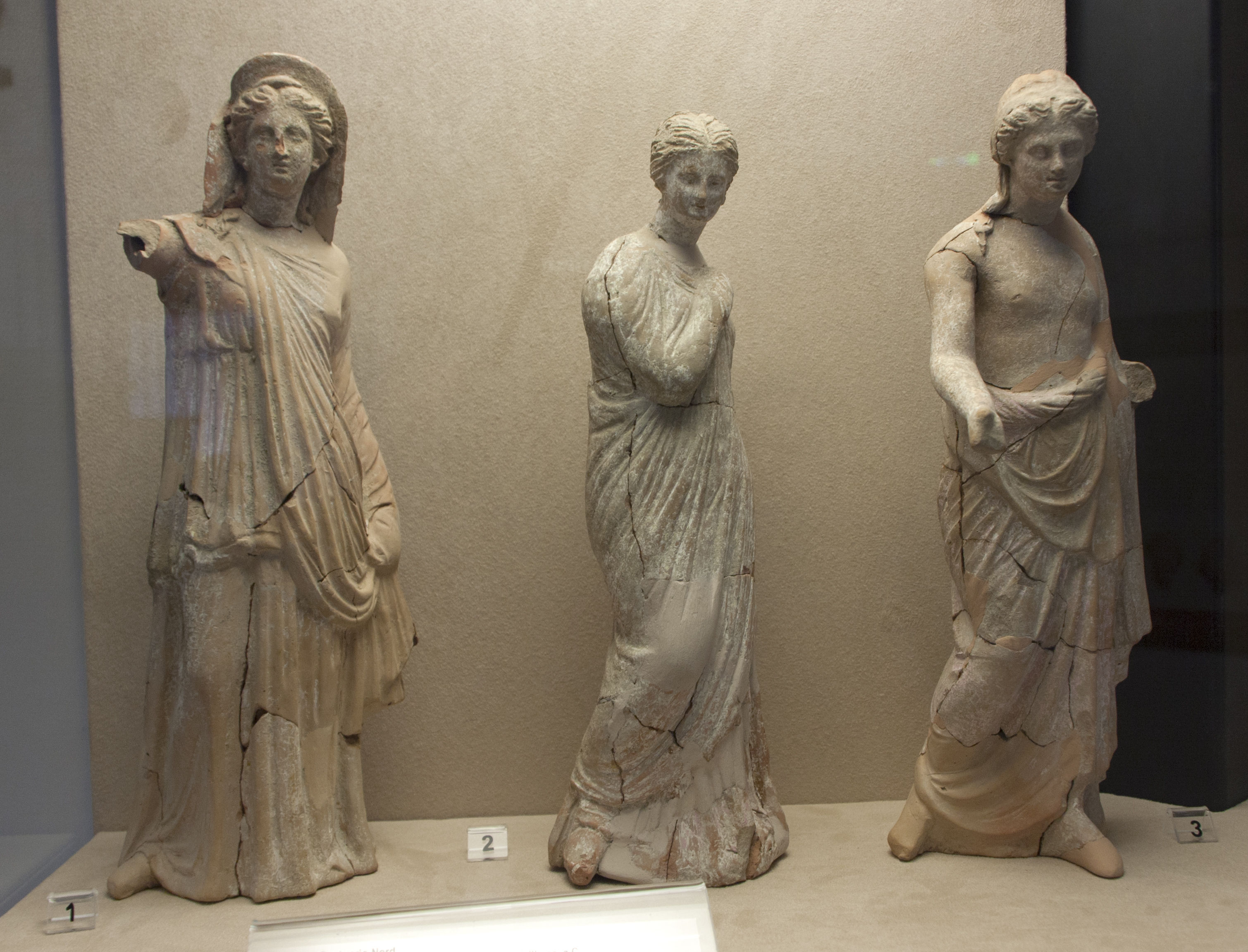
A series of sculptures from the Archaeological Museum of Aidone

The Archaeological Museum of Aidone is a regional museum in Aidone in the province of Enna, Sicily. It is housed in a former Capuchin convent dedicated to Saint Francis. It was inaugurated in the summer of 1984 and preserves the findings of over thirty years of excavations in Morgantina, ordered according to chronological and thematic criteria.

== Works ==
In the three rooms are materials of prehistory and protohistory of the ancient city, coming from the village "castellucciano": smoothed basalt stone axes, tiny cointainers and ceramic fragments worked without the use of a lathe, with an essential linear engraved decoration. At the following Sicilian city, of the early Iron Age, instead, the acromi ceramic in carenate forms, of red and brown paste, finds evidences in the culture of Ausonius in Lipari.

The exhibits belonging to the period from the ninth to the middle of the 5th century BC witness the coexistence of Sicels and Greek cultures in the town: antefixed of religious buildings, "pithoi", a domestic arula on which is depicted a boar, a "kernos" with three small cups and the greater crater of Euthymides, with simposium and "amazzonomachia" scenes, used for public banquets.

The findings of the classical and Hellenistic period, up to the destruction of the city (211 BC), consist mainly of earthenware coming from the necropolis and urban sanctuaries of Demeter and Persephone, including several busts of the latter, to which are added a large "black painted" lamp with three spouts and a fish dish, perhaps from Syracuse.

A limestone statue without head, most likely of the goddess Demeter found in the central sanctuary in 1955, provided the material to show that the famous "Aphrodite" of the Paul Getty Museum in Malibu (USA) comes from Morgantina.

In the former sacristy of the convent are exposed objects of common domestic use, agricultural and religious, offering a picture of the daily life of the inhabitants of the ancient city (kitchenware, children's toys, feminine trinkets, tools for agriculture).

== The Goddess' Return ==
The museum in the 2010s is at the center of events of historical importance. The Italian State has succeeded in obtaining the return of precious artefacts stolen by "tombaroli" and, through the clandestine market bought by the main American museums. On 13 December 2009, two acroliths (two heads, three hands and three feet in marble) from the Greek archaic period, probably belonging to the goddesses Demeter and Kore, very revered in antiquity in Central Sicily, returned from the University of Virginia Museum. December 5, 2010, was the turn of the return from the Metropolitan Museum of New York of a service of sixteen pieces in silver for ritual and table uses, belonging to that Eupolemos, as revealed by the inscriptions engraved in votive arula. Finally, in the spring of 2011, the so-called "Goddess of Morgantina" returned. It is a statue of a treacherous limestone school with an acrolithic technique, in which it is more probable that the goddess Demeter should be recognized. Now it is exhibited at the Regional Archaeological Museum of Aidone, where it was presented on May 17, 2011, in the presence of the authorities. Today it is visible to the public.

== Goddess of Morgantina ==
The Goddess of Morgantina, often called the Venus of Morgantina (though more probably Kore or Demeter) is a 2.25 m high statue, carved between 425 BC and 400 BC in Sicily. The author as likely a direct disciple of Phidias, operating in Magna Graecia. The statue was illegally excavated from the archaeological site. Purchased by the J. Paul Getty Museum in Malibu, it was returned to Italy on March 17, 2011, at the end of a dispute that lasted for several years between Italy and the United States.

The statue is made of two materials: marble was used for the face and for the naked parts of the body, similar to the Metope of Selinunte, but the drapery is instead in calcareous tuff, which has been ascertained to come from Sicily.

== See also ==
- Morgantina treasure
- Archaeological Regional Museum Paolo Orsi of Syracuse
