= Regalbuto =

Regalbuto Regarbutu (Sicilian)
- Comune
- Comune di Regalbuto
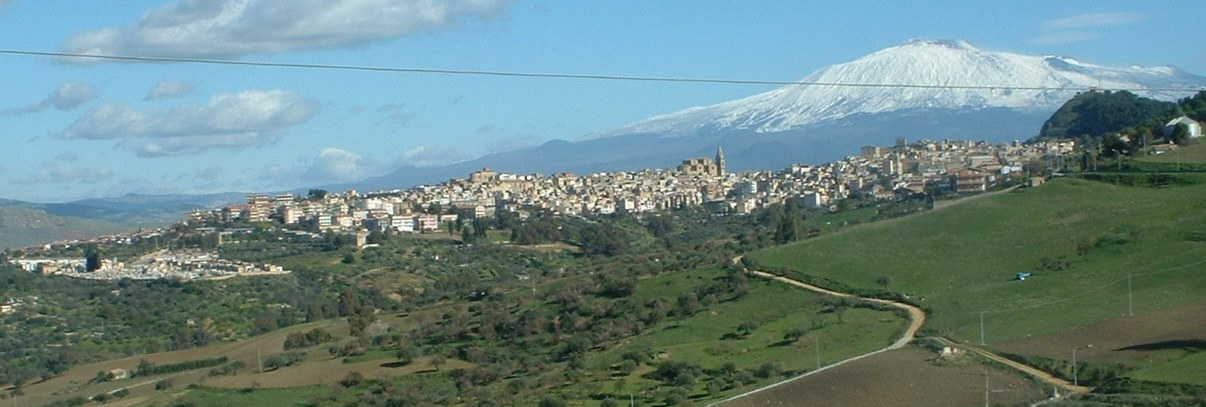
- View of Regalbuto

- Location within Italy Location within Sicily
- Coordinates: 37°38′58.53″N 14°38′22.55″E
- Country: Italy
- Region: Sicily
- Province: Enna (EN)

Government
  - Mayor: Vittorio Angelo Longo

Area
  - Total: 170.29 km^{2} (65.75 sq mi)
- Elevation: 520 m (1,710 ft)

Population (2026)
  - Total: 6,556
  - Density: 38.50/km^{2} (99.71/sq mi)
- Demonym: Regalbutesi
- Time zone: UTC+1 (CET)
  - Summer (DST): UTC+2 (CEST)
- Postal code: 94017
- Dialing code: 0935
- Patron saint: Saint Vitus the martyr
- Saint day: 11 August
- Website: Official website

Regalbuto (Sicilian: Regarbutu) is a town and comune (municipality) in the Province of Enna in the autonomous island region of Sicily in southern Italy, located about 30 kilometres (19 mi) northeast of Enna and 120 kilometres (75 mi) southeast of Palermo. It has 6,556 inhabitants.

Regalbuto borders the municipalities of Agira, Catenanuova, Centuripe, Gagliano Castelferrato, Randazzo, and Troina.

There is an annual cattle fair held in the month of August.

== History ==
Regalbuto may be the ancient town of Amaselos, which was named by the Greek and Sicilian historian Diodorus Siculus in his Bibliotheca historica (Historical Library) writings.

The name Regalbuto derives from the Arab term Rahal Abbud, "Abbud's farmhouse". Discoveries at the site include the old Saracen quarter.

Around 1200, the inhabitants of the nearby town of Centuripe, who rebelled against the Swabian dynasty whom Regalbuto had been faithful to, destroyed Regalbuto. Years later, King Manfred had the town rebuilt at its present site.

In 1860, a number of members of parliament met in Regalbuto with Garibaldi to discuss a truce during the Campaign of 1860.

The town was never subject to fiscal taxes, and a free magistracy elected by the king and the archbishops of Messina governed it. The town was severely damaged during World War II, and on August 3, 1943 the Pionier Battalion of Hermann Göring Panzer Division, supported by tanks and self-propelled guns was forced to cede the town, after four days of bitter fighting by the 1st Infantry Brigade of 1st Canadian Infantry Division. The current inhabited center was reconstructed only recently.

== Demographics ==
As of 2026, the population is 6,556, of which 50.2% are males, and 49.8% are females. Minors make up 14.7% of the population, and seniors make up 25.3%.

Historical population

Year	Pop.	±%
1861	9,115	—
1871	9,504	+4.3%
1881	10,032	+5.6%
1901	11,179	+11.4%
1911	13,614	+21.8%
1921	14,883	+9.3%
1931	10,447	−29.8%
1936	11,218	+7.4%

Year	Pop.	±%
1951	11,768	+4.9%
1961	11,239	−4.5%
1971	10,159	−9.6%
1981	7,621	−25.0%
1991	7,981	+4.7%
2001	7,744	−3.0%
2011	7,388	−4.6%
2021	6,743	−8.7%

Source: ISTAT

=== Immigration ===
As of 2025, immigrants make up 7.4% of the population. The 5 largest foreign countries of birth are Germany, Tunisia, Romania, Argentina, and Bangladesh.

== Main sights ==
- Chiesa Madre San Basilio (Mother Church of Saint Basil) dedicated to Saint Basil, which was built on the site of a 16th-century building and preserving a luxurious 10 meter altar dedicated to Saint Vitus. It has a Baroque façade with a pyramid shaped bell tower.
- Santa Maria della Croce: 15th-century church with a Baroque staircase
- San Giovanni:18th-century church with a large bell loggia
- Town hall (Palazzo Municipale, 18th century)
- Remains of the 13th-century castle:
- Palazzo Citelli-Fascaro (17th century)
- Palazzo Falcone (17th century)
- Palazzo Campagnini in Liberty Style
- Palazzo Carchiolo

In the city environs are sites of naturalistic interest like the Pozzillo Lake district, one of Europe's largest man-made lakes, fed by the Salso River. Mountains include the Monte Mascari (863 metres (2,831 ft)), north of the lake, and, also in the lake vicinity, the Monte Salici (1,442 metres (4,731 ft)).

== Economy ==
The economy is based on agriculture, including cereals, citrus, and olives. Animal husbandry includes cattle, sheep, and goats.
