= Barbara Tsakirgis =

American archaeologist and professor (1954–2019)

- Born: May 12, 1954; Arlington, Massachusetts
- Died: January 16, 2019 (aged 64)
- Occupation: Archaeologist
- Years active: 1979–2019
- Known for: Greek and Roman archaeology

Barbara Tsakirgis (1954 – January 16, 2019) was an American classical archaeologist with specialization in Greek and Roman archaeology, particularly of ancient Greek houses and households. She worked in the archaeological excavation sites in Sicily and Athens for her doctoral thesis from Princeton University on the subject of Hellenistic houses at Morgantina. Her thesis was published as The Domestic Architecture of Morgantina in the Hellenistic and Roman Periods (1984). She taught at the Vanderbilt University's Department of Classical Studies and was an associate professor from 1992 to 2019.

== Biography ==
Tsakirgis was born in Arlington, Massachusetts on May 12, 1954 and was raised in Boston, Massachusetts. She studied at Yale University from 1972 to 1976 and obtained a Bachelor of Arts (Cum laude in Classics). She then pursued her studies in archaeology from Princeton University and received Master of Arts in June 1979 and doctoral degree (Ph.D.) in January 1984. Her doctoral thesis was on Hellenistic Greek art and archaeology for which she did field investigations at Athens and Sicily. These excavations were done at Morgantina, La Befa, Corinth, and the Athenian Agora which provided information on how the past history and human behavior as patterns and activities of human behavior have replicated over time. She also studied at the American School of Classical Studies in Athens during 1975, and 1980–1981. Her studies included at the American Numismatic Society during 1982.

Tsakirgis started her professional career in the Princeton University as an Assistant Instructor in 1979. In 1984 she joined as assistant professor in the Department of Classical Studies, and in the College of Arts and Science, Vanderbilt University, and worked as associate professor from 1992 to 2019. She was chair of the Faculty Council of the College of Arts and Science and the Secretary of the College Faculty between 2005 and 2011 for two terms. Earlier, she worked as the director of undergraduate studies and the director of graduate studies. She teaches several courses with a "multi- and interdisciplinary approach to classical antiquity." Based on her research activities in Greek architecture and urbanism, she also conducts classes on Greek art, the Periklean period of fifth century BC Athens, and the institutions of the Greek city. Her teaching assignments also cover subjects such as Alexander the Great and the Trojan War with specific relevance to history, art, and literature. Her teaching assignment has, from time to time, involved seminar in writing on "spectacle (drama and sports) in the Greek and Roman world". During 2010, she did a hands-on-training for 18 students of the university at an excavation site in Greece.

Tsakirgis was a long-time member of the research team excavating the Hellenistic city of Morgantina in Sicily; her particular interests, on which she has published, have been in the domestic organisation of the houses and households and the decorated pavements.

For her research studies in Greece, Tsakirgis received many research grants such as the Franklin grant from the American Philosophical Society in 2012 to pursue research and publish papers and books on the excavations of houses in the Athenian Agora. With these funds she also did research in Greece on the houses and compared it with the Athenian houses.

She died on January 16, 2019.

== Awards ==
Bill Haslam, Governor of Tennessee named Tsakirgis, in 2012, to the Tennessee Archaeological Advisory Council.

== Publications ==
Tsakirgis's publications in the form of research articles are numerous and relate to her work in the field on many aspects of Greek houses and households. Some of these are mentioned below. She has also held invited lectures extensively. Her book relates to the excavations at Morgantina.

=== Articles ===
- The Decorated Pavements of Morgantina I: the mosaics (1989)
- The Decorated Pavements of Morgantina II: the Opus signinum (1990)
- Recent Work at Morgantina (1992)
- Morgantina: A Greek town in central Sicily (1995)
- Greek Houses and Households (1996)
- Greek Architecture: Theory and Criticism (1996) (in the Grove Dictionary of Art)
- A (New) Chimney Pot from the Athenian Agora (2001)
- Greek and Roman Houses and Villas; Palaces (2009) (in the Oxford Encyclopedia of Greece and Rome)

=== Books ===
- The Domestic Architecture of Morgantina in the Hellenistic and Roman Periods (1984)

== Memberships ==
Tsakirgis is member in the several committees, institutes and societies. Some of these positions are:

- Managing Committee of the American School of Classical Studies,
- Vice-chair of the Managing Committee of the America's first overseas research institution
- Academic trustee of the Archaeological Institute of America (AIA)
- The Nashville Society of the AIA.
- AIA Committee for Archaeology in Higher Education

== Bibliography ==
- Counts, Derek; Tuck, Anthony (23 November 2009). KOINE: Mediterranean Studies in Honor of R. Ross Holloway. Oxbow Books. ISBN 978-1-78297-366-9.
