= Chiesa Madre Immacolata Concezione, Centuripe =

Roman Catholic church in Sicily, Italy

Coordinates: 37.62402°N 14.74001°E

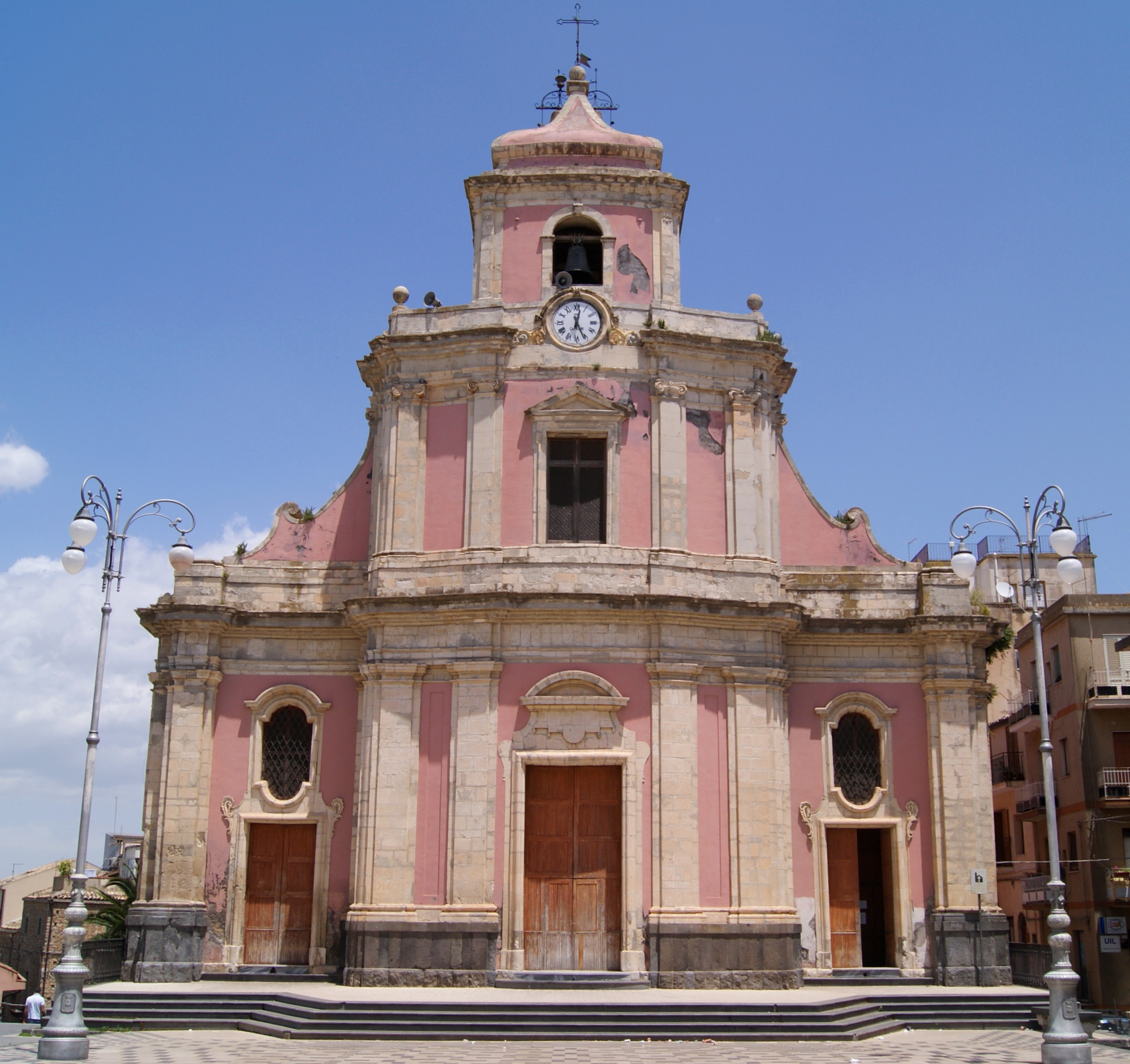
Facade of church

The Chiesa Madre is the Roman Catholic "mother church" or duomo of the town of Centuripe, in the province of Enna, region of Sicily, Italy. It is dedicated to the Marian devotion of the Immaculate Conception (Immacolata Concezione).

== History and description ==
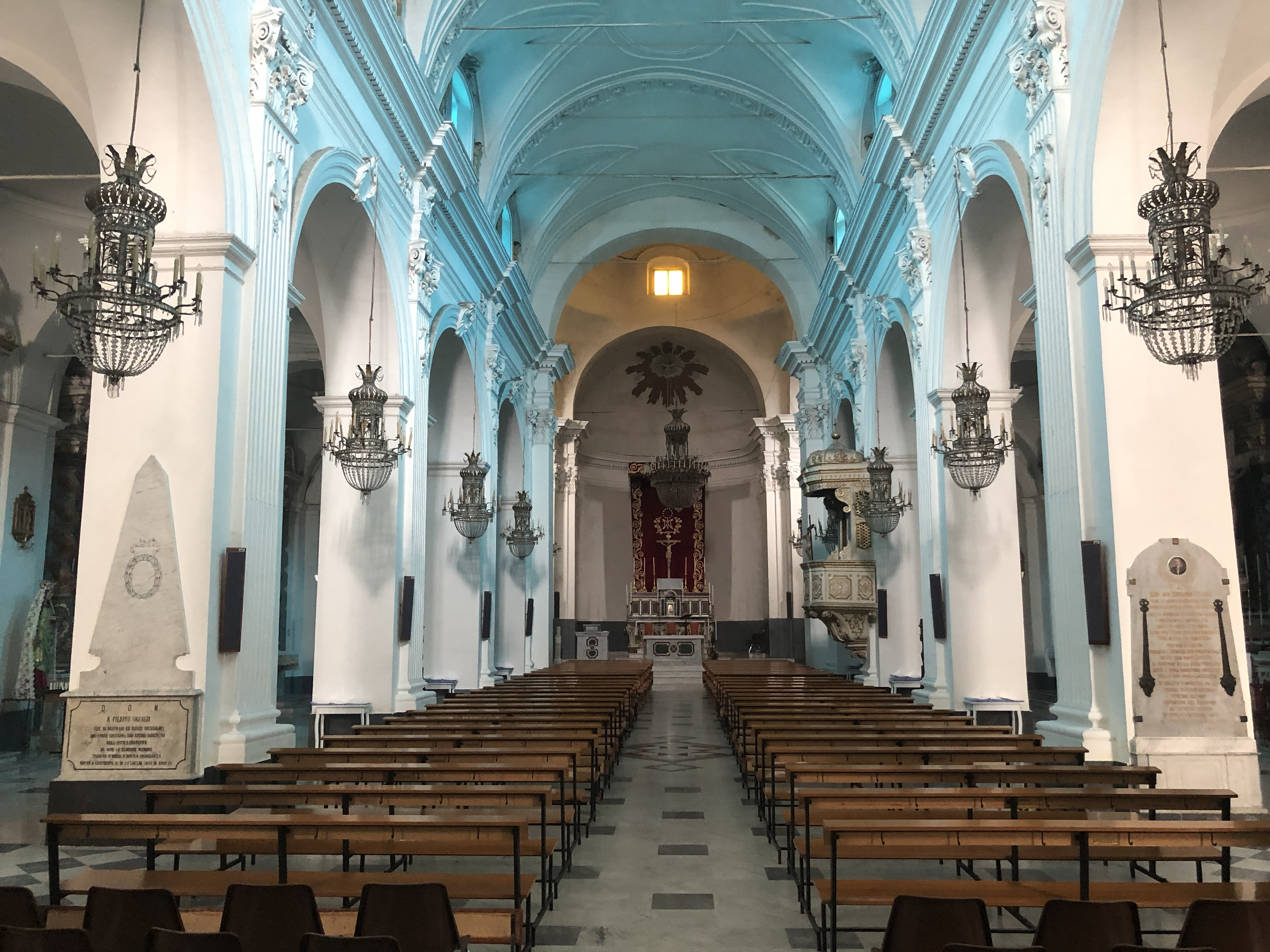
Nave of church

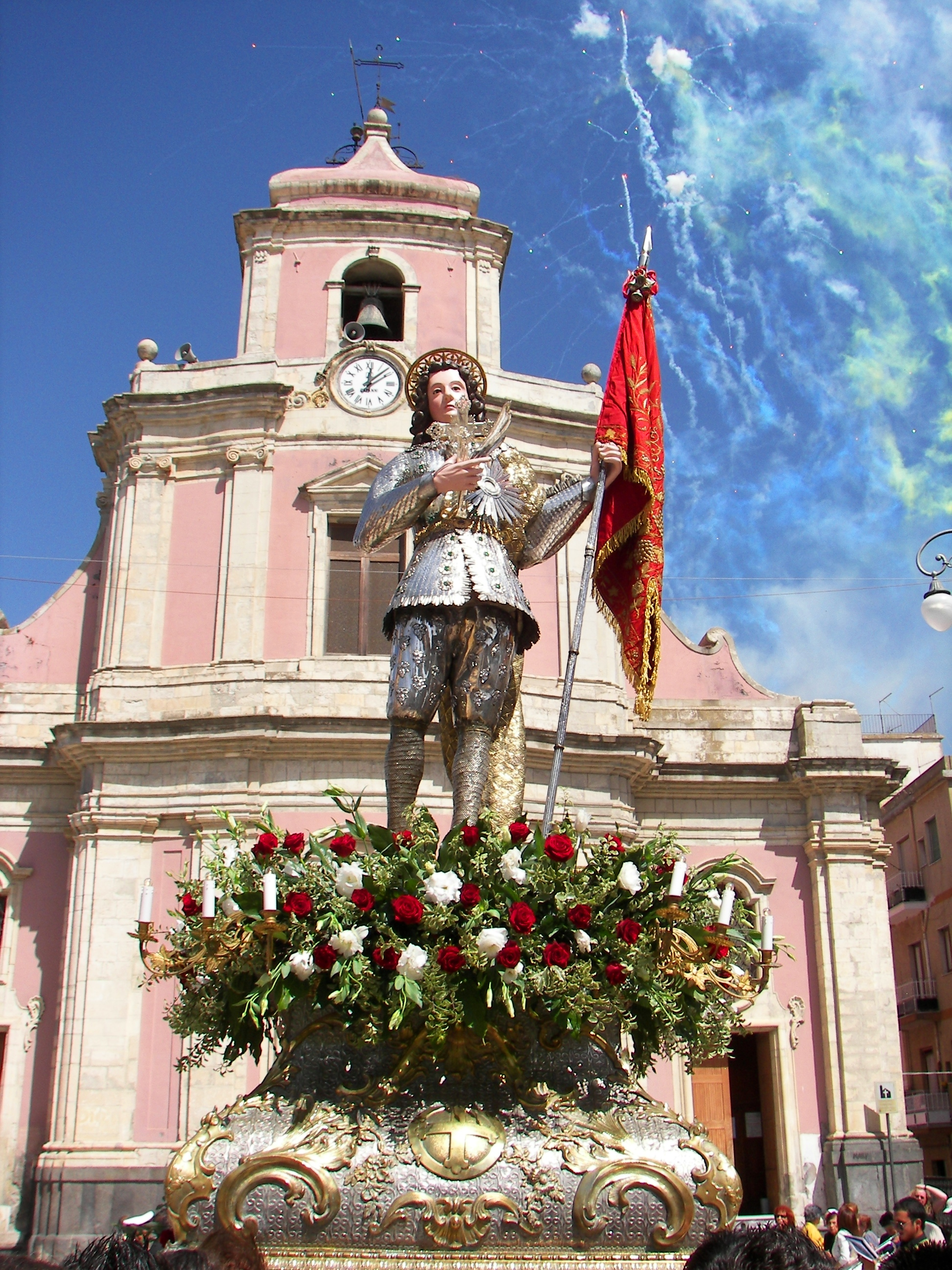
Simulacrum with icon of San Prospero on display outside of church

The church was first built in the first decades of the 17th-century and consecrated in 1728. The facade has both a bell-tower and a clock. The interior has a Latin cross layout, with a central nave separated from the flanking aisles by ten pillars. The transept altars are dedicated to the patron saints of Centuripe, Santa Rosalia and san Prospero. The nave has a carved wooden pulpit with gilded details. The intricate tile design of the Piazza Duomo in front of the church was added in the late 20th-century.
