= Chiesa Madre San Basilio, Regalbuto =

Roman Catholic church in Sicily, Italy

Coordinates: 37.6°N 14.5°E

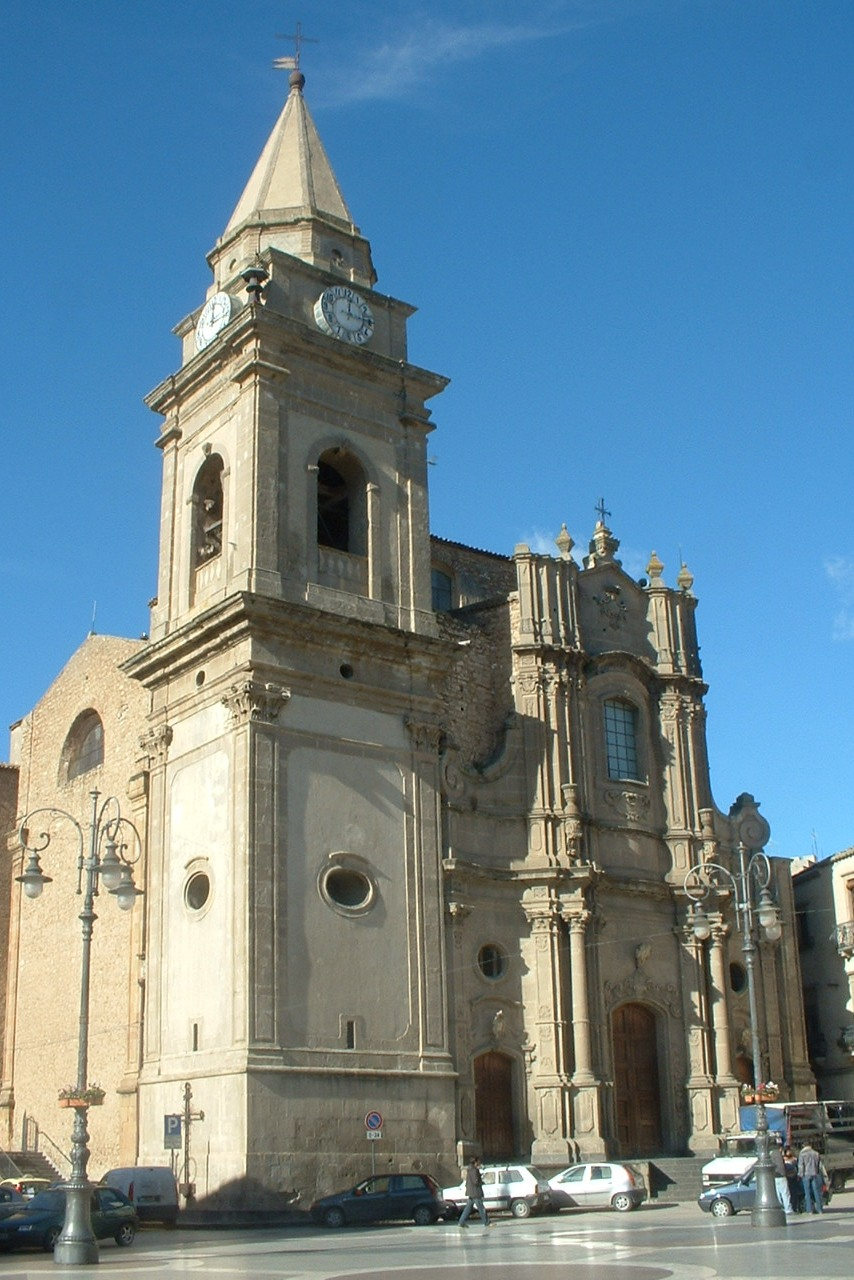
Facade of church

San Basilio is the main Roman Catholic church, or chiesa madre (mother church), of the town of Regalbuto, province of Enna, region of Sicily, Italy. It is located in the central plaza.

== History ==
A church at the site was present by the 16th-century, but the present church was rebuilt in the 18th-century, completed in 1764. The rich Baroque facade of the church clashes with the more sober and neoclassical square bell-tower to the right. The church facade recalls the style of Rosario Gagliardi.

Unusual for churches in Sicily, the interior consists of a single nave with lateral chapels flanked by broad pilasters. The chapels have elaborate polychrome marble altars. The interior has an elegantly decorated and gilded stucco decoration. The apse has wooden choir stalls and is backed by a tall organ.
