= Morgantina treasure =

Greek silver hoard

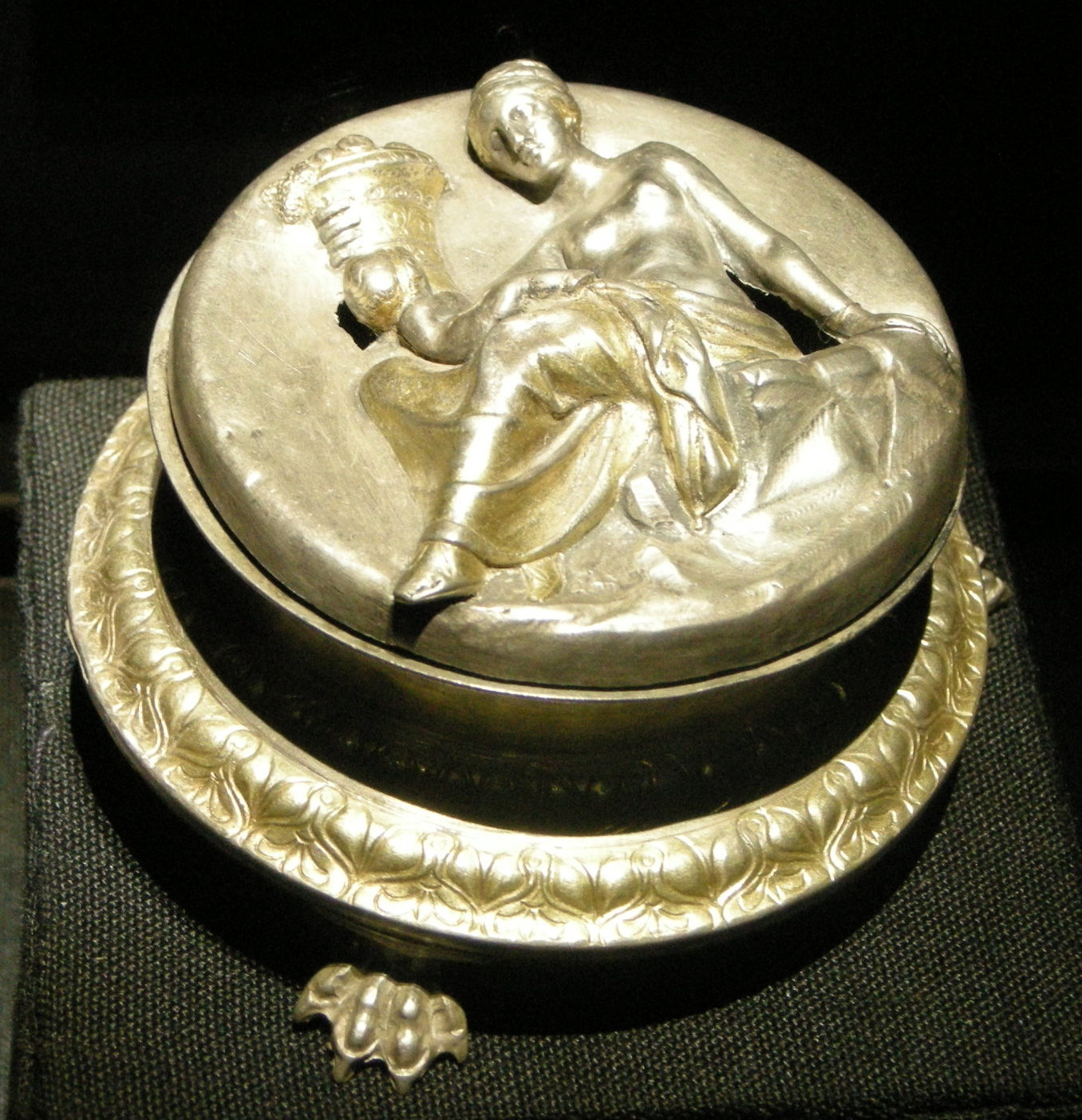
Pyxis with Eirene

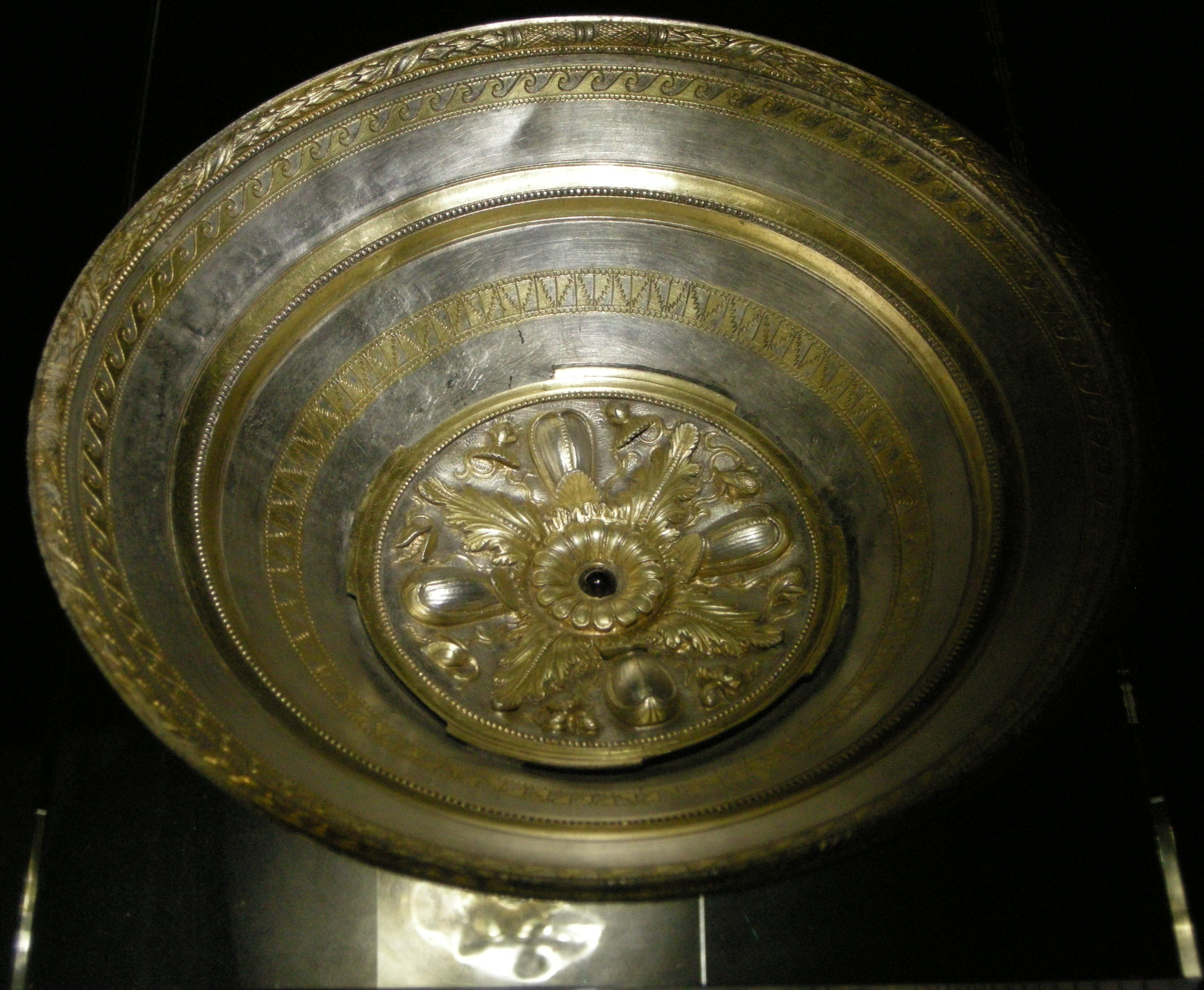
Phiale with 12 rays

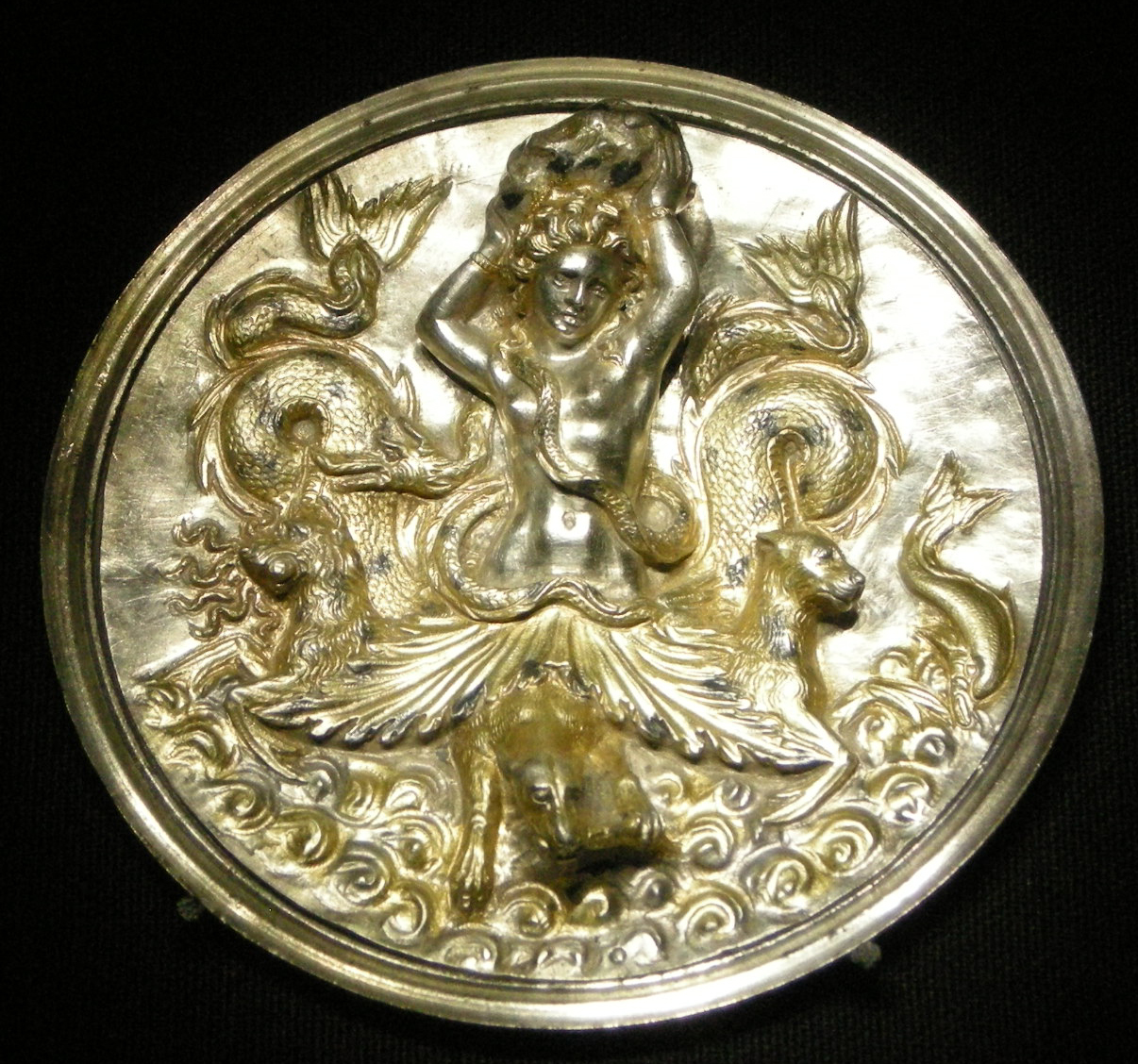
Pyxis with Scylla

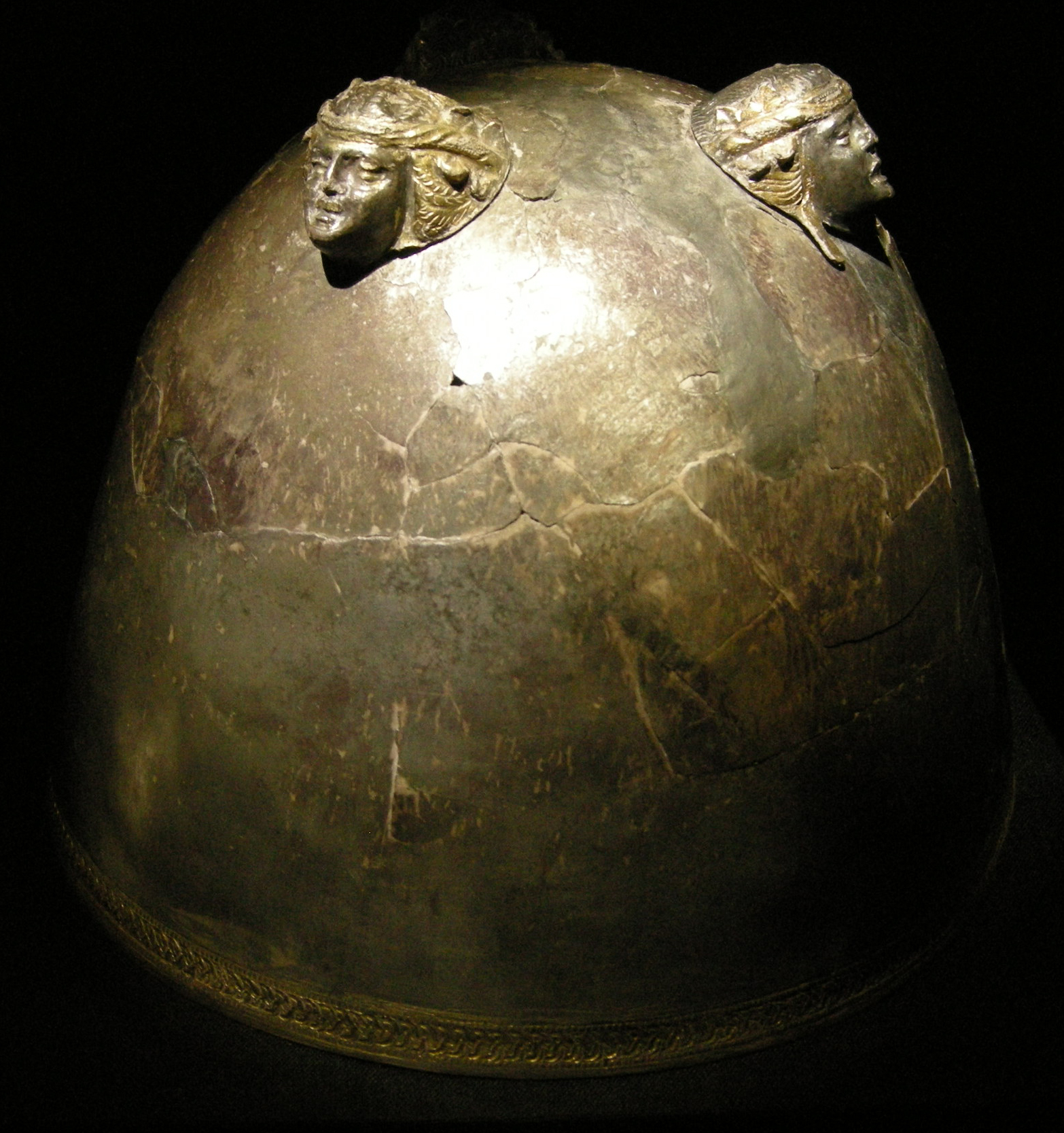
Bowl for mixing wine

The Morgantina treasure is a set of 16 pieces of Greek silverware with details in gold dating from the 3rd century BC, illegally excavated from Morgantina, an ancient Greek city in Sicily, near modern Aidone. The hoard includes two large bowls, a cup with two handles, plates and several drinking utensils. It was probably excavated around 1978 (the date of a modern coin found buried at the most likely site), and was bought by the Metropolitan Museum of Art in New York in 1981 and 1982. After protracted pressure, in 2010, the treasure was transferred from the Metropolitan to Rome, before returning to Sicily.

== History ==
The treasure was deposited in an ancient building of Morgantina, perhaps hidden there at the sack of the city at the hands of the Romans in 211 BC. The creation of the objects is dated to around 240 BC, when the city was subject to Hieron II of Syracuse.. The treasure was looted from the site in c. 1979-80, in two events.

According to some scholars, the treasure belonged to the hierophant, the high priest of Demeter and Persephone.

The Metropolitan Museum of New York City bought the treasure in two lots in a chain from looter to middleman in Switzerland, then a dealer who sold them to the Museum. The Museum resisted for many years attempts by the Italian government to repatriate the looted treasure.

In 2006, the Ministry of Cultural Heritage, the regional commissioner for cultural heritage and activities of Sicily and Philippe De Montebello, the director of the Metropolitan Museum of New York, agreed that the treasure would be returned to Italy. In 2010, after its return, the treasure was temporarily displayed in the Palazzo Massimo alle Terme in Rome and then delivered to Sicily.

== Description ==
The treasure is made up of the following pieces:

- Two deep cups with a concave profile (diameter: 22 cm, weight: 407–418 g);
- Pyxis (diameter 10.5 cm, weight 81 g) with a depiction of Eirene holding a cornucopia and a little Eros or Plutus;
- Hemispheric cup (diameter 13–14 cm, weight 151 g);
- Ovoid skyphos (diameter 13.3 cm, weight 300 g);
- Kyathos (diameter 5.5 cm, weight 119 g, height 24.7 cm);
- Two truncated conical receptacles for mixing wine, with three supports shaped like theatrical masks of Demeter, Persephone and Dionysus (diameter: 26 cm, weight: 891 g, height: 20 cm);
- Deep cup with a conical profile (diameter: 21 cm, weight 479 g, height: 6.8 cm);
- Olpe with an ovoid body (diameter: 8 cm, weight: 178 g, height: 9.1 cm);
- Mesomphalos phiale with 12 rays (diameter: 14.8 cm, weight: 104 g, height: 2.3 cm);
- Pyxis (diameter: 8.3 cm, weight: 148 g, height 5.5 cm) with a depiction of Scylla or perhaps Sicilia, throwing a mass of volcanic rock;
- Small cylindrical altar (bomiskos) on a square base (base: 10.6x10.6 cm, weight: 368 g, height: 11 cm) decorated with a bucranium and the words "sacred to the God" in Ancient Greek.
- Pair of horns (length: 15.5 cm, weight 74 g) used in religious rites.
