= Ottavio Profeta =

Italian poet (1890–1963)

Ottavio Profeta (October 10, 1890 – November 23, 1963) was an Italian poet.

== Biography ==
Ottavio Profeta was born in Aidone, Italy on October 10, 1890, to Franco and Adele Piazza. After earning a university degree in law and a short public job in Catania, Sicily, he befriended Giovanni Verga, Luigi Capuana and Luigi Pirandello, and followed their lead in artistically representing the fall of romantic illusions, with a focus on "losers", the poor, and the middle-class, which he viewed as trapped between desperation and disillusionment. He died in Mascalucia in 1963.

== Published works ==
- L'amante dell'amore
- Nascere
- Odia il prossimo tuo
- Sicilia Favola vera
- De Roberto e Pirandello
