= Santa Maria della Croce, Regalbuto =

Church building in Regalbuto, Sicily, Italy

Coordinates: 37.6°N 14.5°E

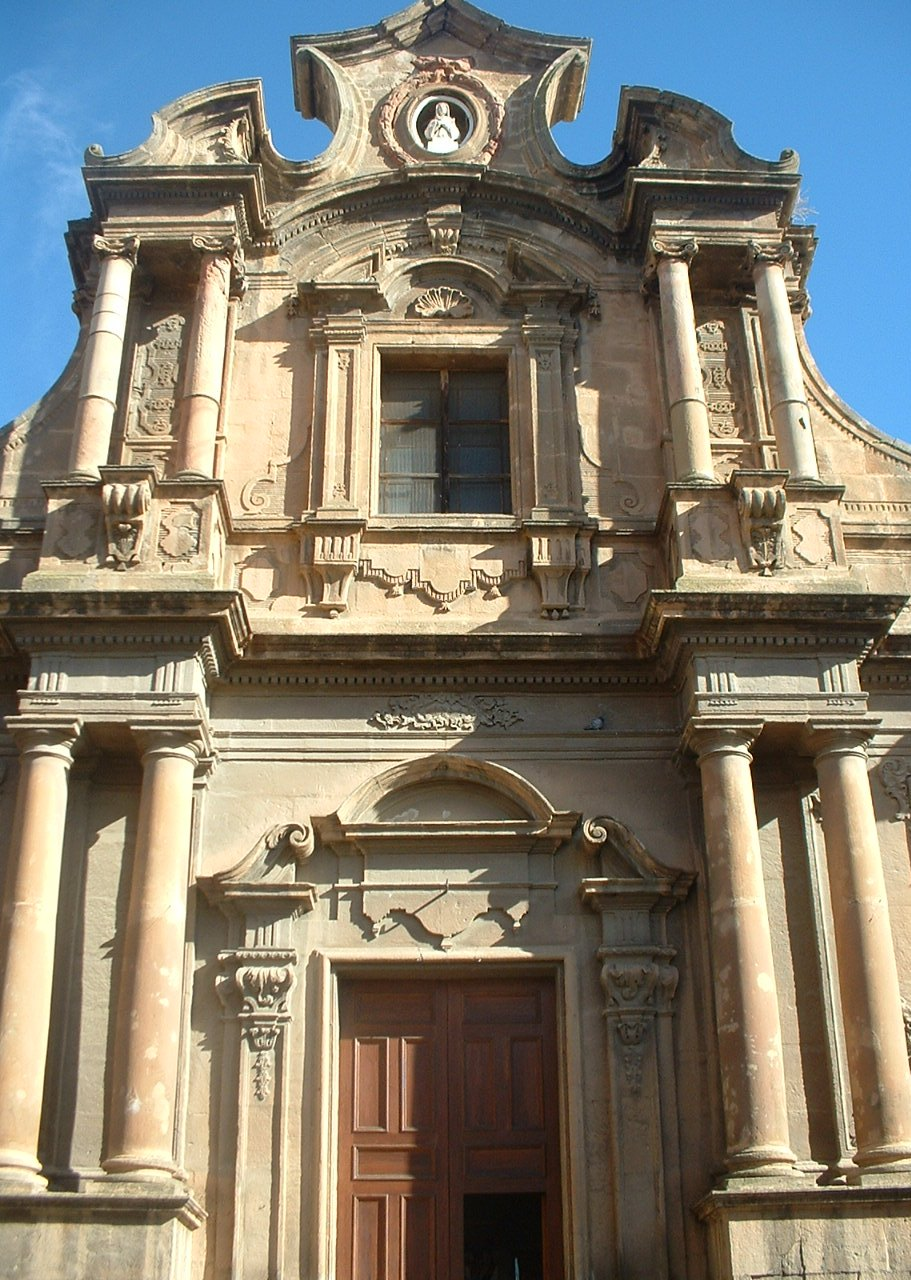
Facade of church

Santa Maria della Croce is a Roman Catholic parish church located in Regalbuto, province of Enna, Sicily, Italy.

== History ==
A church was first begun at the site in the 15th century and placed under the leadership of the Chiesa Matrice of San Basilio. Construction was slow and was only completed in 1744. The interior decoration was not completed until 1805. The church has a large central nave separated from the aisles by a row of columns. The church ends in three naves. The presbytery is elevated from the nave. The interior has richly coloured stucco decoration.

The church and some of the artworks were heavily damaged during bombings in 1943. Some of the altars have been replaced by those from the former church of Sant'Antonio da Padova (found in the town's Convent of Santa Maria degli Angeli) and from the church of Sant Agostino. The baroque facade is rich in columns.
