= Morgantina =

Ancient settlement in Sicily

- Μοργάντιον / Μοργαντίνη (Ancient Greek)
- Morgantia, Morgantium, Morgentia, Murgantia, Murgentia
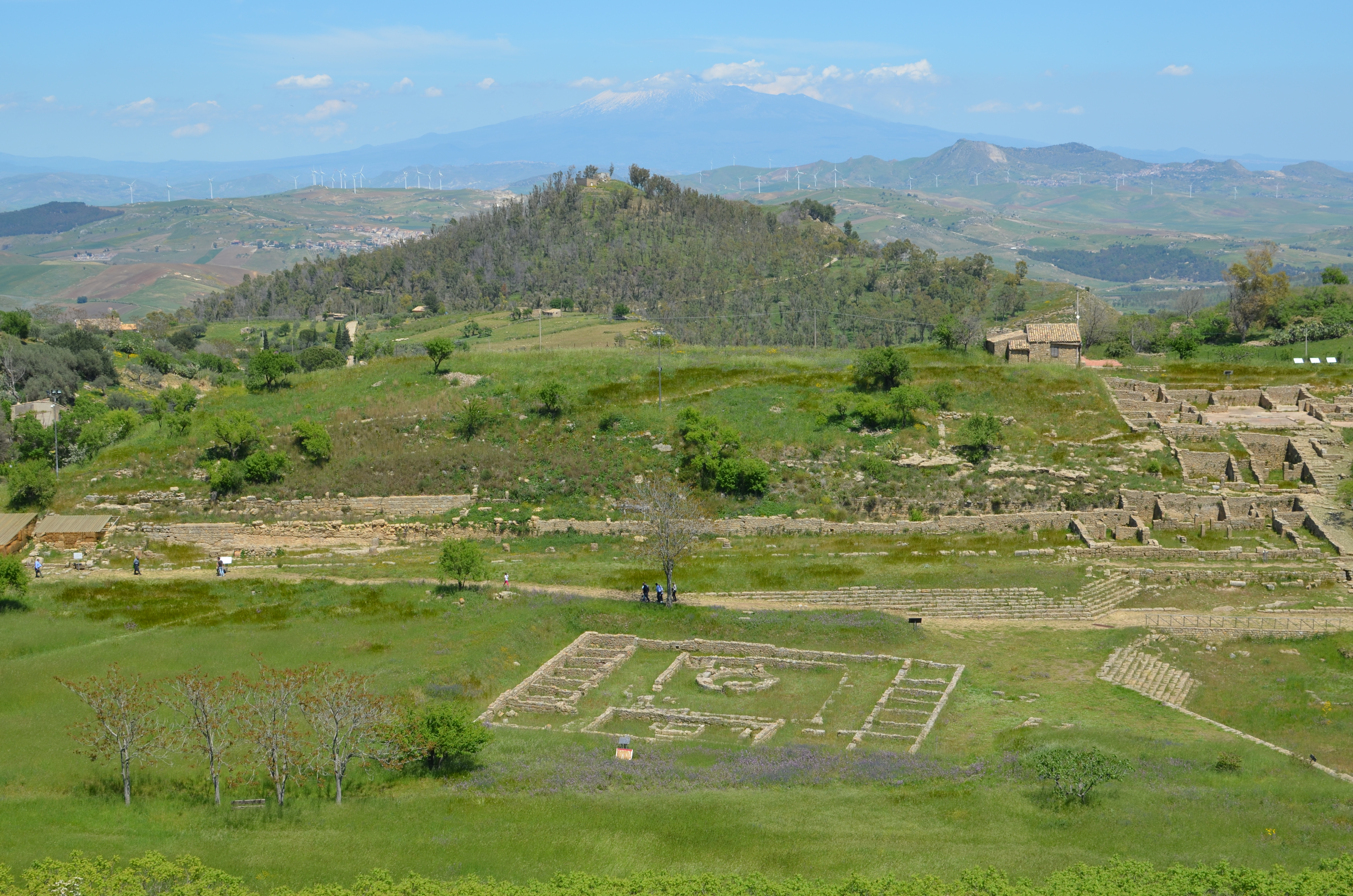
- View of Morgantina's Hellenistic agora. An Iron Age settlement was located on the Cittadella hilltop in the background. Mount Etna is seen in the distance.

- Location within Sicily
- 37°25′51″N 14°28′46″E
- Type: Settlement
- Periods: Late Bronze Age to Roman Republic
- Location: Aidone, Province of Enna

Site notes
- Excavation dates: 1884, 1912, 1955–1963, 1966–1967, 1968–1972, 1978–present
- Archaeologists: Luigi Pappalardo, Paolo Orsi, Erik Sjöqvist, Richard Stillwell, Hubert L. Allen, William A. P. Child, Malcolm Bell III, Carla Antonaccio
- Management: Soprintendenza BB.CC.AA. di Enna
- Website: Area Archeologica Morgantina (in Italian)

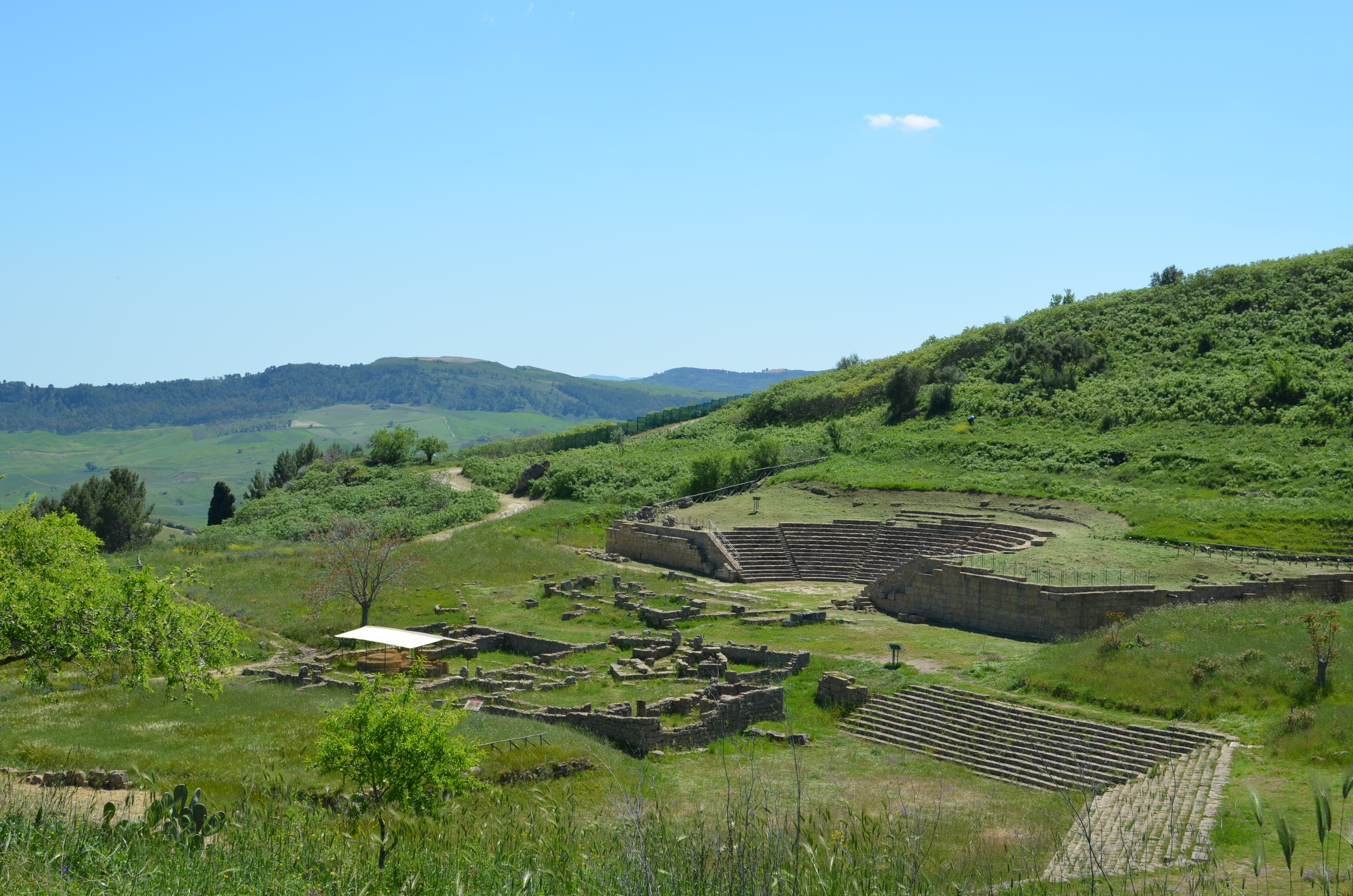
The Greek theater, the Sanctuary of Demeter and Persephone, and the ekklesiasterion

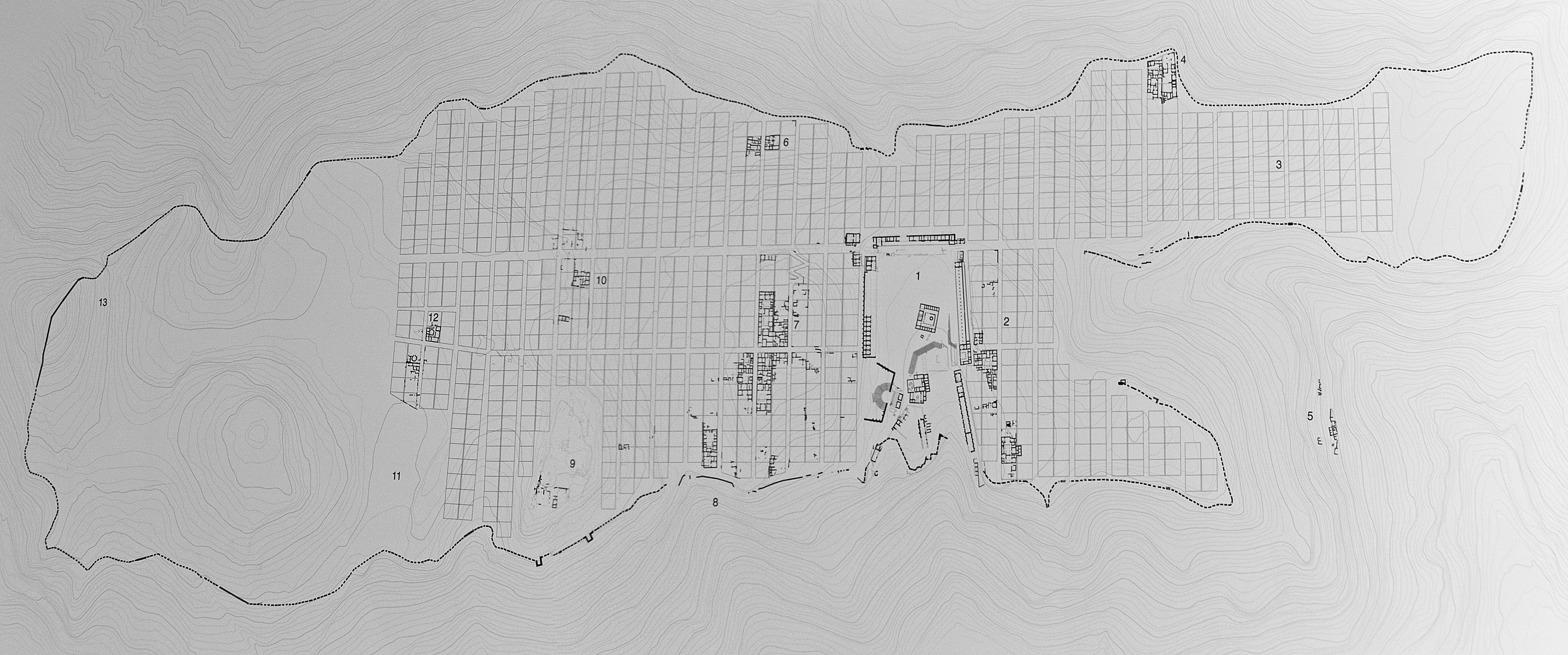
Plan

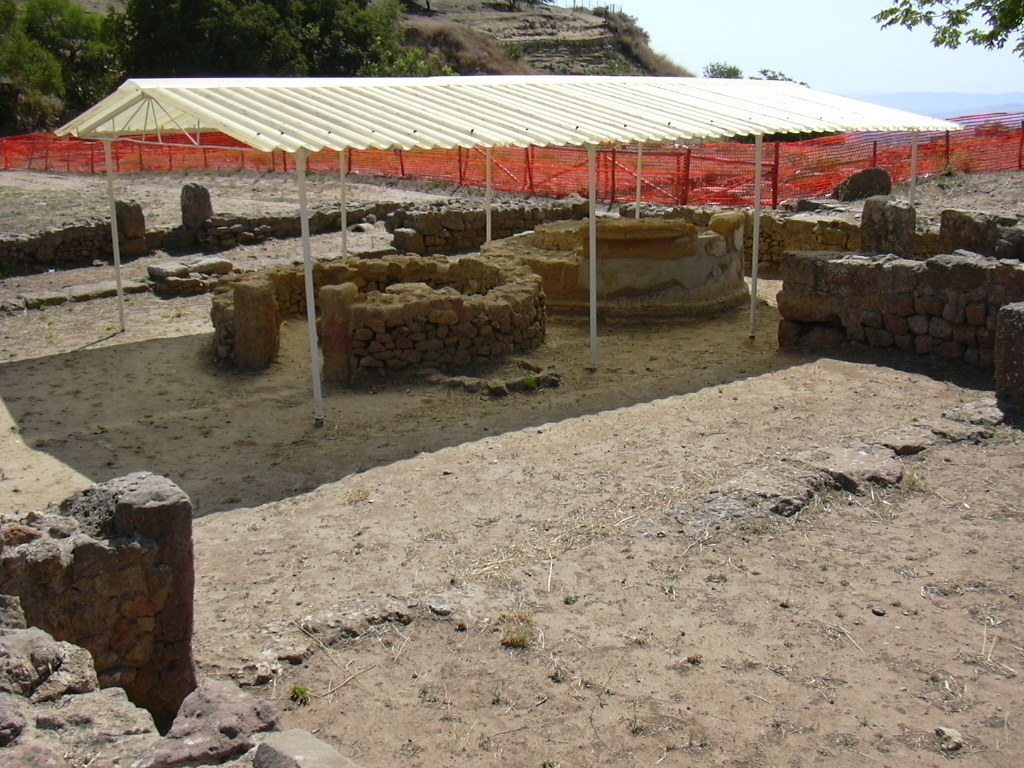
Agora sanctuary dedicated to a chthonic deity; the sacred area is characterized by a cylindrical altar

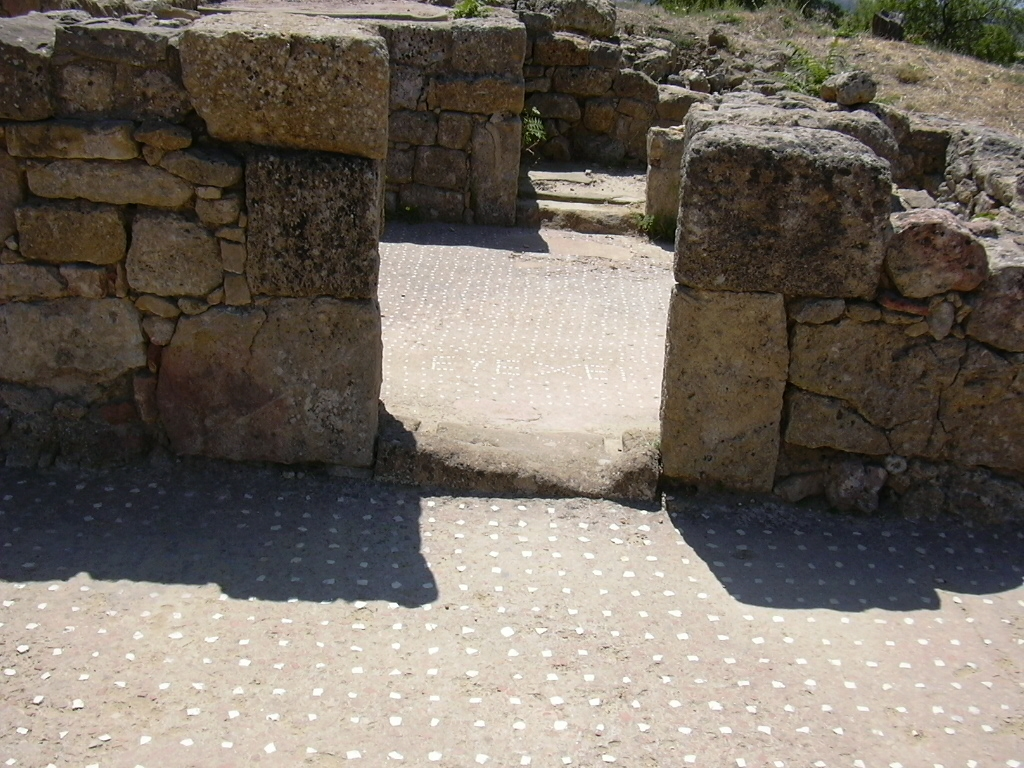
House of the Doric Capital, mosaic floor

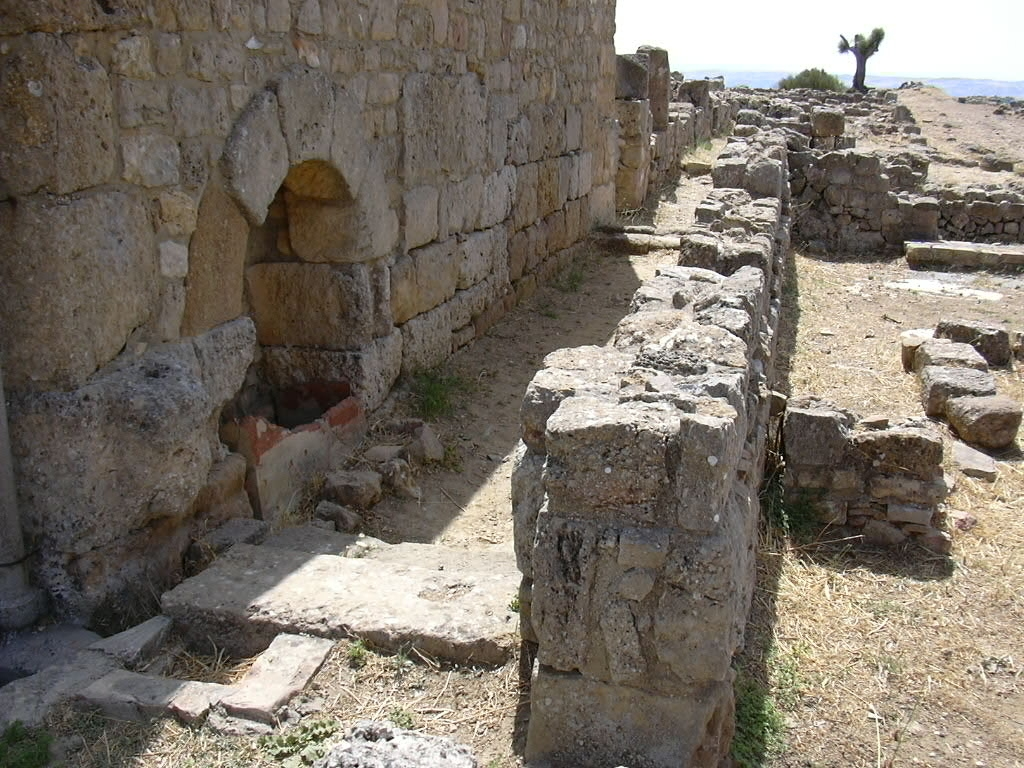
House of the tank arc

Morgantina (Ancient Greek: Μοργάντιον and Μοργαντίνη) is an archaeological site in east central Sicily, southern Italy. It is sixty kilometres from the coast of the Ionian Sea, in the province of Enna. The closest modern town is Aidone, two kilometres southwest of the site. The site consists of a two-kilometre-long ridge running southwest–northeast, known as Serra Orlando, and a neighbouring hill at the northeast called Cittadella. Morgantina was inhabited in several periods. The earliest major settlement was made at Cittadella and lasted from about 1000/900 to about 450 BCE. The other major settlement was located on Serra Orlando, and existed from about 450 BCE to about 50 CE in Magna Graecia. Morgantina has been the subject of archaeological investigation since the early 20th century.

Serra Orlando was identified as Morgantina by Kenan Erim following the discovery of a number of coins bearing the Latin word HISPANORUM. Erim used these coins and passages from Livy to argue that the city found at Serra Orlando was in fact the ancient city of Morgantina.

== History ==
The name appears in different forms among different authors: Morgantia, Murgantia and Morgantium in scholarship; in ancient sources Strabo used the name Μοργάντιον, Diodorus Siculus used Μοργαντίνη and Stephanus of Byzantium writes that it was also called Μοργεντία. The name is variously written by Latin writers as Murgantia, Murgentia and Morgentia. The inhabitants were called Murgentini by Cicero and Pliny the Elder.

According to Strabo, Morgantina was founded by a pre-Roman Italian group known as the Morgetes of Rhegium. Dionysius of Halicarnassus wrote that the Morgetes were led by a king named Morges. The earliest historical date associated with Morgantina is 459 BCE, when Ducetius, leader of the indigenous Sicel population of central Sicily, attacked the city and captured it. Morgantina was probably still under Ducetius' control when he was defeated at Nomai by Syracuse in 449 BCE.

No later mention of Morgantina is made until Thucydides lists it as part of the terms of a truce in the war of 427–424 BCE between Syracuse and the Dorian cities of Sicily on one side, and Kamarina, the Khalkidian cities of Sicily, the Sikels, and Athens on the other side. Thucydides says that Syracuse agreed at the Congress of Gela to give Morgantina to Kamarina in return for payment of an indemnity. Kamarina was destroyed in 405 by the Carthaginians. Morgantina, therefore, must have been independent from at least this date, although it was soon recaptured by Dionysios of Syracuse in 396. Syracuse retained (occasionally more nominal than actual) control of Morgantina until the Second Punic War. In 317, Morgantina received the tyrant Agathocles, then in exile, and offered him help in returning to Syracuse. He was elected praetor at Morgantina, and later dux.

As part of the Syracusan kingdom of Hiero II, Morgantina fell under the hegemony of Rome when Hieron became a Roman vassal in 263. In 214, Morgantina switched its allegiance from Rome to Carthage. Morgantina remained autonomous until 211 when it became the last Sicilian town to be captured by the Romans. It was given as payment by Rome to a group of Spanish mercenaries. In 133, Morgantina was the place where Eunus, the leader of the slave rebellion known as the First Servile War, died. In the Second Servile War, Morgantina was besieged and taken by slaves. The final mention of Morgantina comes again from Strabo, who notes that in his own time, the first century CE, the city had ceased to exist.

A few literary sources describe Morgantina and its economy. Most famous of these are the references to the vitis murgentina, a strain of grape mentioned by Cato, Columella, and Pliny the Elder. These grapes were prized for their wine — Pliny called it "the very best among all those that come from Sicily" — and had been transplanted from Sicily to mainland Italy by the 2nd century BCE.

Diodorus Siculus mentiones the Gorgus of Morgantina (Ancient Greek: Γοργὸς Μοργαντῖνος), surnamed Cambalus (Ancient Greek: Κάμβαλος) who was one of the chief men of wealth and authority in the city and his father who was also named Gorgus. Both were killed by thieves.

== Excavation history ==
=== Early work on Serra Orlando ===
The earliest excavations at Morgantina were undertaken by Luigi Pappalardo in 1884. He uncovered part of a necropolis, a large terracotta drain and two houses. One of the houses he found, the Pappalardo house, was named for him by later American excavators.

Paolo Orsi recorded stray finds from Morgantina and excavated trial trenches in 1912. He located a terrace of nine steps, and walls, as well as what he called 'a Roman house'.

=== Princeton University ===
Morgantina has been the principal site of American research on classical Sicily. Currently there are two other sites on the island with significant American presences: the Soprintendenza BB.CC.AA. di Catania's excavations at Palike, and the work undertaken by Stanford University and Northern Illinois University as part of a consortium of primarily Scandinavian institutions at Monte Polizzo. In 1955, a major project was begun by Princeton University, under the supervision of Professors Erik Sjöqvist and Richard Stillwell. The excavations on the (then unidentified) town were intended to serve as training for graduate students in Princeton's Department of Art and Archaeology. Major figures who participated in work at Morgantina include Kenan Erim, Donald White, T. Leslie Shear Jr., Ione Mylonas Shear, R. Ross Holloway, Stephen Miller, Paul Deussen, and Karl Erik Östenberg. Special mention should also be made of Sweden's King Gustaf VI Adolf, who came to Morgantina on several occasions in the 1950s at the invitation of Sjöqvist, his former secretary, to work at the site.

=== Hubert Allen and the University of Illinois ===
In the mid-1960s, Princeton graduate student Hubert L. Allen assumed a role in the administration of the excavations. Upon receiving his doctorate, Allen was hired by the University of Illinois, which then began to co-sponsor the Morgantina project. The death of Sjöqvist and retirement of Stillwell in the early 1970s led to Princeton's withdrawal from direct involvement in the excavations. Allen continued to lead the project until 1975, when he was denied tenure at Illinois and took a position with University of Illinois computer sciences. At that point, American work at Morgantina was put on hold.

=== University of Virginia and Wesleyan University ===
The excavations had produced vast amounts of artefacts and data, but as yet there was no final publication. In 1978, Malcolm Bell III, professor of classical art and archaeology at the University of Virginia, took over the project with the goal of publishing the Morgantina material. Bell was a former Princeton graduate student (Sjöqvist had been Bell's advisor until his retirement) who had written his dissertation on terracotta figurines found at Morgantina. He has conducted investigations on Serra Orlando since 1982, each time with the intention of answering specific questions raised by earlier work. Bell used his dissertation as the basis for the first book in the Morgantina Studies series published in 1983. Six volumes have appeared in the series, which is the main vehicle for the definite publication of the excavation results.

In 1990, Carla Antonaccio, then on the faculty of Wesleyan University but now at Duke University, herself a Princeton graduate, assumed responsibility for publishing the post-7th century BCE settlement on Cittadella. Since that time, both Virginia and Wesleyan, along with many other American and Italian institutions, have sent scholars and students to conduct research. Notable scholars currently working on the project include Barbara Tsakirgis of Vanderbilt University on the houses of Serra Orlando, Jenifer Neils of Case Western Reserve University on figured pottery, Barbara Barletta of the University of Florida on architectural mouldings, Rosa Maria Albanese Procelli and Enrico Procelli, both of the University of Catania on the Bronze Age material, John Kenfield of Rutgers University on architectural terracottas, and Robert Leighton of the University of Edinburgh on the protohistoric settlement on Cittadella.

The site's archives are currently housed at the Department of Art and Archaeology at Princeton University, though some materials also exist at the University of Illinois.

=== Looting and restitution of Morgantina artworks ===
By the 1980s, a number of works looted from or near the Morgantina site were marketed to major collectors and institutions, with the now-disgraced dealer Robin Symes serving as an intermediary. The works include an Aphrodite purchased by the J. Paul Getty museum, the parts of two acroliths purchased by Maurice Tempelsman, and the Morgantina treasure purchased by the Metropolitan Museum of Art. All the works were returned to Italy and are on display at the museum of Aidone.

=== North Baths ===
Since 2003 Sandra K. Lucore (formerly of the University of Tokyo, now an independent scholar) has led excavations of the 3rd century BC North Baths complex that have produced interesting results including evidence of one of the earliest examples of dome and barrel vault construction.

=== Bouleuterion ===
The bouleuterion in Morgantina is a rectangular building located west of the agora of the city. It was founded during the 3rd century BC, a period of great prosperity for Morgantina, which, from the 5th century BC on had acquired a profoundly Hellenic character.

The building had a bipartite plan. A walled forecourt led through a stoa to the main entrance, centrally located at the east wall of the auditorium. A rectangular substructure held wooden benches where the assembly sat to listen to the speakers. Stone buttressing, connected to this substructure, supported the south retaining wall.

Today, only the foundation and parts of the south side of the auditorium are preserved.

== Archaeological Museum of Aidone ==
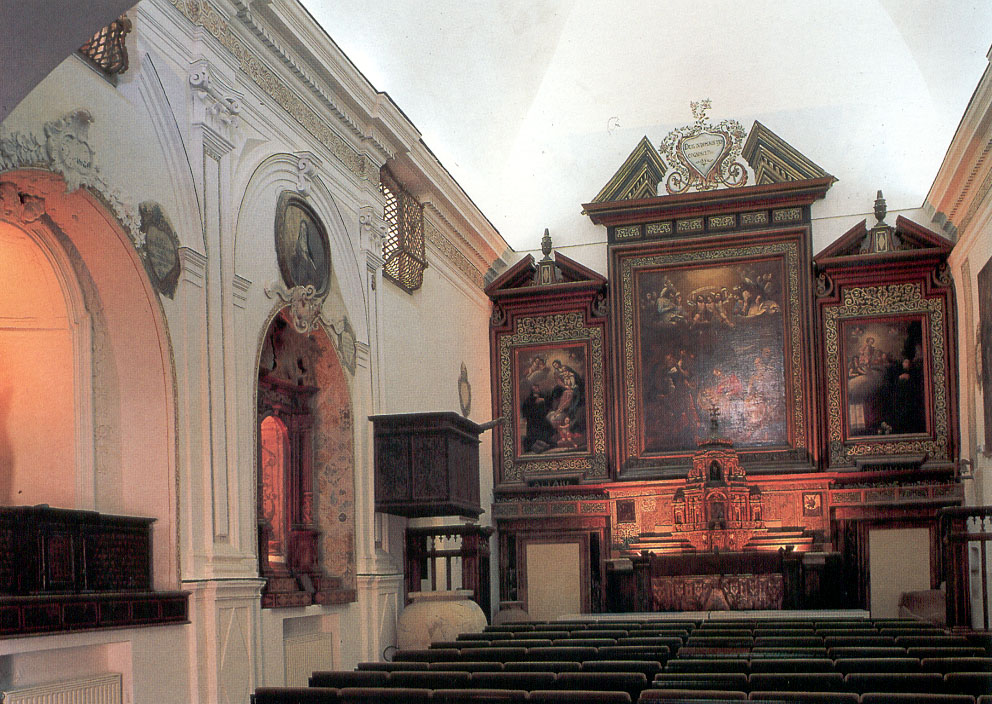
Interior of the church of St. Francis Capuchin - Auditorium, home of the Archaeological Museum of Aidone

The Archaeological Museum of Aidone was opened in Aidone in 1980 to house finds from Morgantina. The building, dating from the 17th century, is a former Capuchin monastery. The museum is run by the Soprintendenza BB.CC.AA. di Enna. There are two floors of exhibits, covering the site's prehistoric, archaic, and classical periods, along with a thematic display that draws attention to aspects of ancient daily life.

== See also ==
- Morgantina treasure
- List of ancient Greek cities
- Early and simple domes
