= Aidone =

Aidone Aiduni (Sicilian)
- Comune
- Comune di Aidone
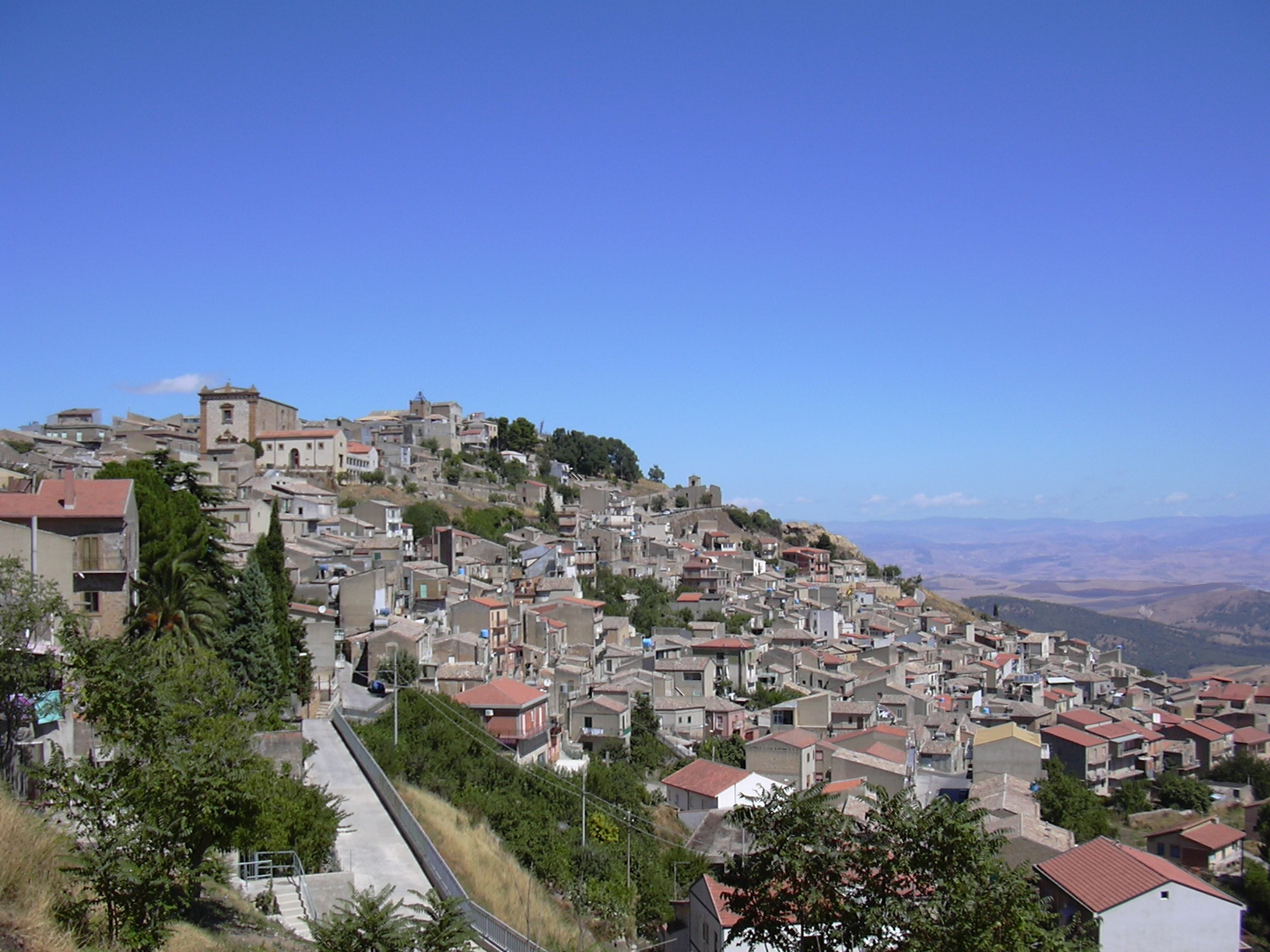
- View of Aidone

- Location within Italy Location within Sicily
- Coordinates: 37°25′N 14°27′E
- Country: Italy
- Region: Sicily
- Province: Enna (EN)

Government
  - Mayor: Anna Maria Raccuglia

Area
  - Total: 210.78 km^{2} (81.38 sq mi)
- Elevation: 800 m (2,600 ft)

Population (2026)
  - Total: 4,205
  - Density: 19.95/km^{2} (51.67/sq mi)
- Demonym: Aidonesi
- Time zone: UTC+1 (CET)
  - Summer (DST): UTC+2 (CEST)
- Postal code: 94010
- Dialing code: 0935
- Patron saint: Saint Lawrence
- Saint day: August 10
- Website: Official website

Aidone (Gallo-Italic of Sicily: Aidungh or Dadungh; Sicilian: Aiduni) is a town and comune (municipality) in the province of Enna in the autonomous island region of Sicily in Italy. It has 4,205 inhabitants.

The extensive archaeological site of Morgantina is on a ridge close to the town.

== Etymology ==
There are a variety of etymologies proposed for the name of the town. One suggests putatively derives from the Arabic Ay dun meaning mountain of water.

== Demographics ==
As of 2026, the population is 4,205, of which 50.8% are male, and 49.2% are female. Minors make up 11.7% of the population, and seniors make up 27.6%.

Historical population

| Year | Pop. | ±% |
|---|---|---|
| 1861 | 5,984 | — |
| 1871 | 6,326 | +5.7% |
| 1881 | 7,551 | +19.4% |
| 1901 | 8,535 | +13.0% |
| 1911 | 8,814 | +3.3% |
| 1921 | 8,772 | −0.5% |
| 1931 | 7,837 | −10.7% |
| 1936 | 8,694 | +10.9% |

| Year | Pop. | ±% |
|---|---|---|
| 1951 | 10,106 | +16.2% |
| 1961 | 8,905 | −11.9% |
| 1971 | 7,551 | −15.2% |
| 1981 | 7,136 | −5.5% |
| 1991 | 7,275 | +1.9% |
| 2001 | 6,057 | −16.7% |
| 2011 | 4,929 | −18.6% |
| 2021 | 4,284 | −13.1% |

Source: ISTAT

=== Immigration ===
As of 2025, immigrants make up 11.7% of the total population. The 5 largest foreign countries of birth are Germany, Somalia, Bangladesh, Romania, and Switzerland.

== See also ==
- Lombards of Sicily
- Ottavio Profeta

== Main sights ==
- Archaeological site of Morgantina
- Church of Santa Maria la Cava
- Mother Church of San Lorenzo
- The Regional Archaeological Museum of Aidone contains many archaeological remains from Morgantina.
- Castellaccio, with ruins of a hilltop castle and wide panorama.
