= Centuripe =

Centuripe Centorbi (Sicilian)
- Comune
- Comune di Centuripe
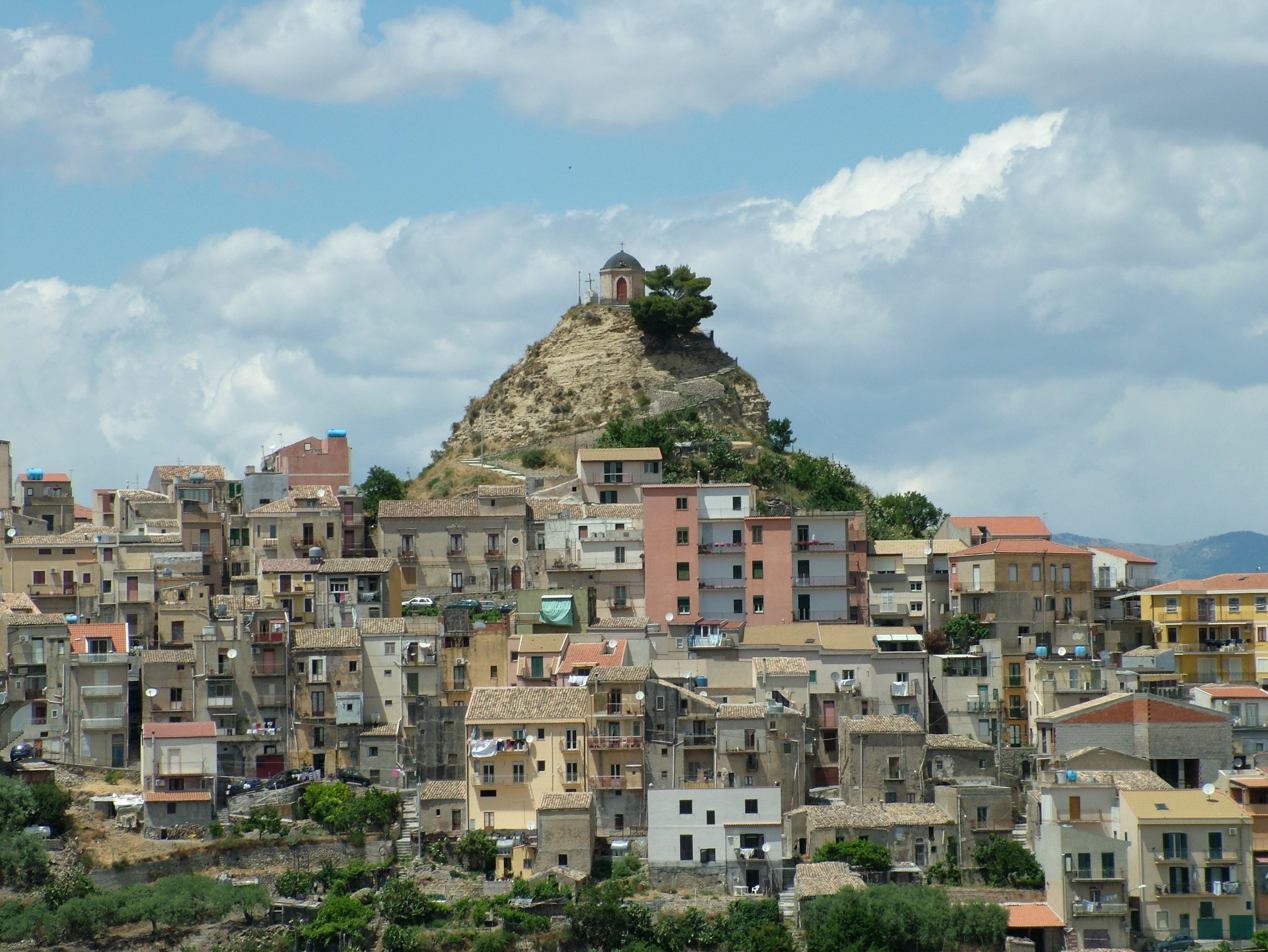
- View of Centuripe

- Coat of arms

- Location within Italy Location within Sicily
- Coordinates: 37°37′N 14°44′E
- Country: Italy
- Region: Sicily
- Province: Enna (EN)
- Frazioni: Carcaci

Government
  - Mayor: Salvatore La Spina

Area
  - Total: 174.20 km^{2} (67.26 sq mi)
- Elevation: 730 m (2,400 ft)

Population (2026)
  - Total: 4,981
  - Density: 28.59/km^{2} (74.06/sq mi)
- Demonym: Centuripini
- Time zone: UTC+1 (CET)
  - Summer (DST): UTC+2 (CEST)
- Postal code: 94010
- Dialing code: 0935
- Patron saint: St. Prosper
- Saint day: 19 September
- Website: www.comune.centuripe.en.it

Centuripe (Latin: Centuripae; Sicilian: Cintorbi) is a town and comune (municipality) in the province of Enna in the autonomous island region of Sicily in Italy. The city is 61 kilometres (38 mi) from Enna, in the hilly countryside between the Rivers Dittaìno and Salso. It has 4,981 inhabitants.

The economy is mostly based on agriculture. There are caves for sulphur and salt mineral, and water springs.

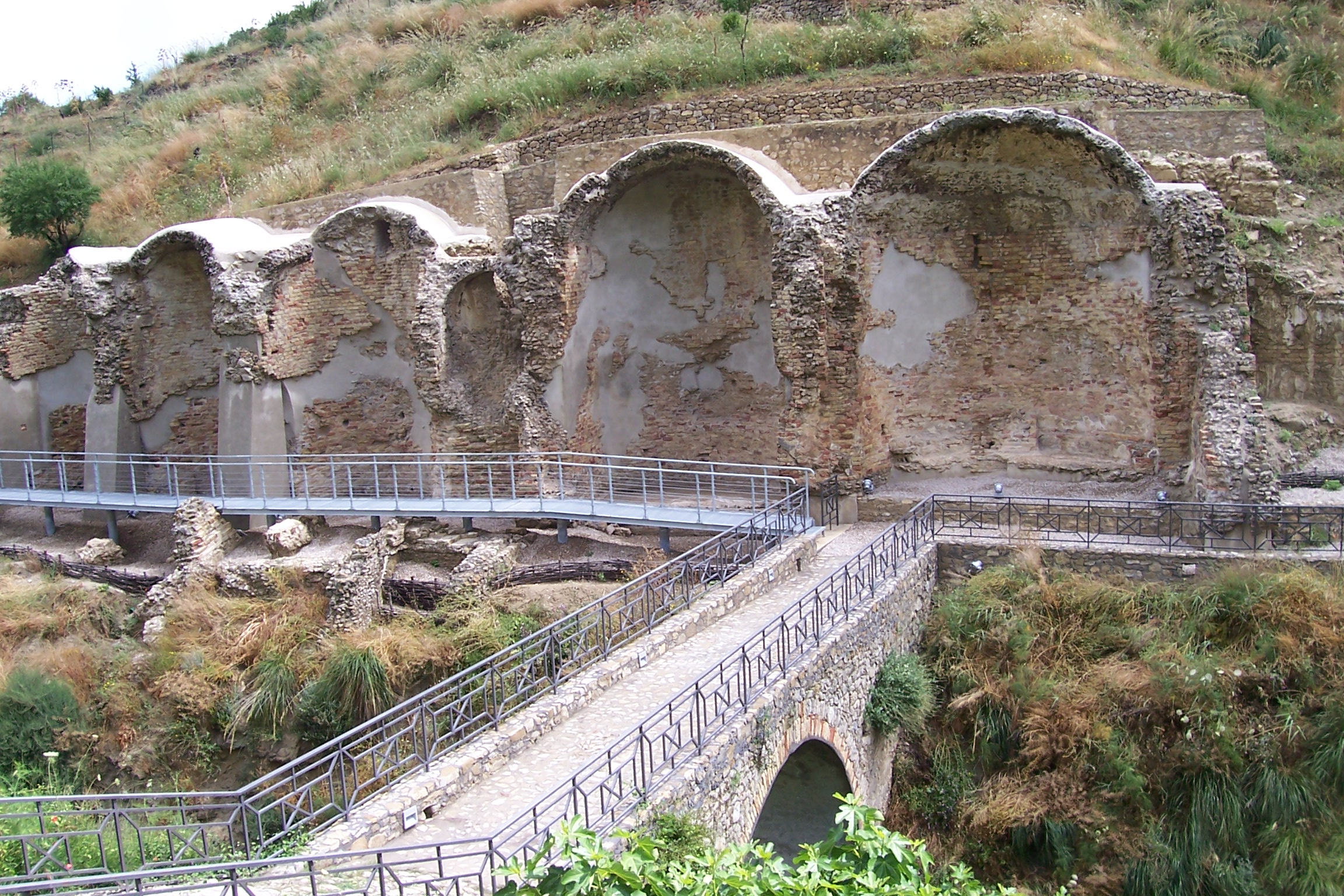
Thermal baths

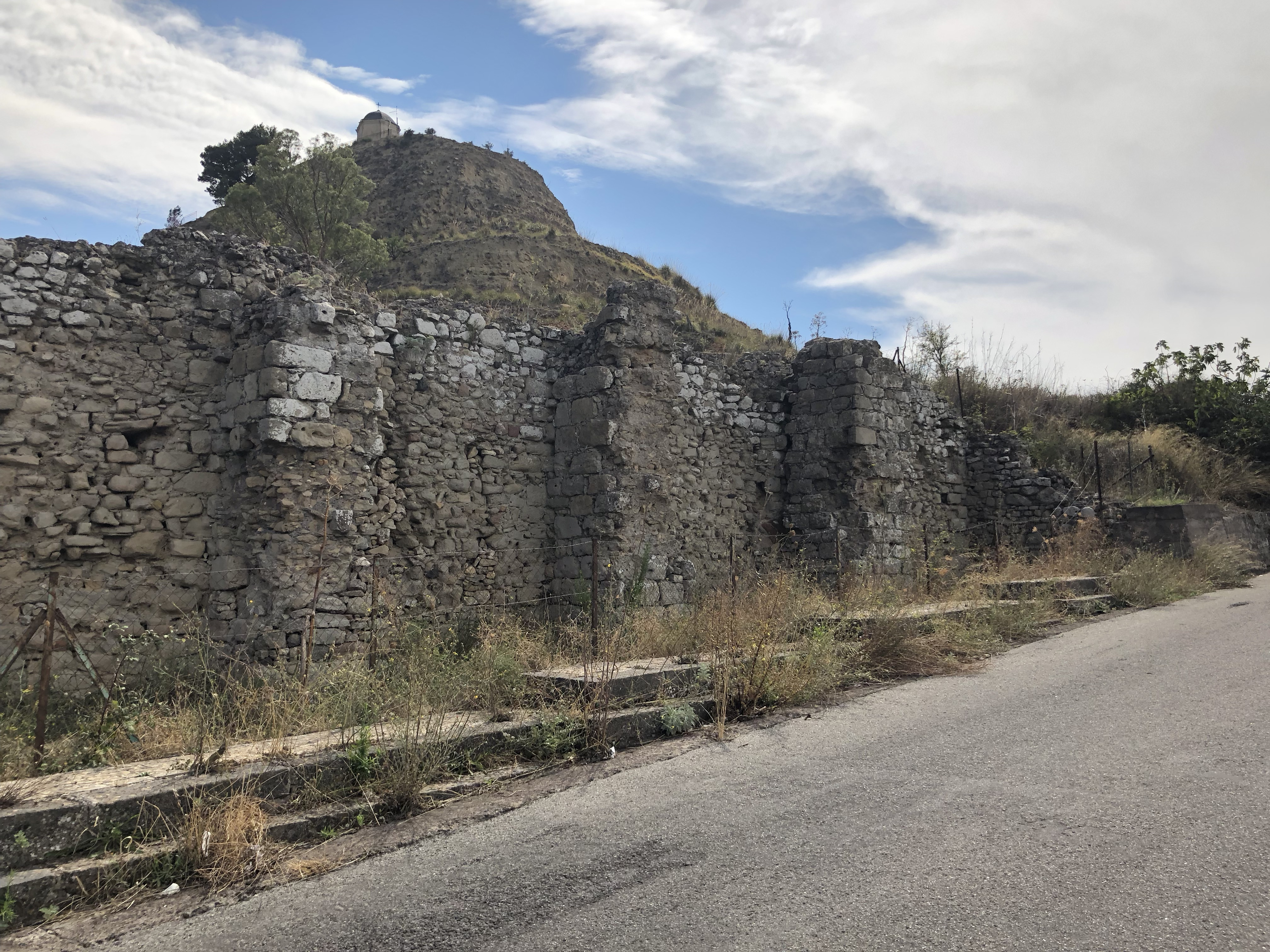
Villa at Panneria

== History ==
Thucydides mentions Kentoripa (Κεντόριπα) (also called Kentoripai) as a city of the Sicels that was Hellenized in the 5th century BC. It became an ally of the Athenians at the time of their expedition against Syracuse, and maintained its independence almost uninterruptedly (though it fell under the power of Agathocles) until the First Punic War when it immediately submitted to the Romans. It was thus granted Latin Rights before the rest of Sicily and was a civitas immunis ac libera sine foedere (free city exempted from tax).

In the 3rd and 2nd centuries BC Centuripe Ware was a distinctive class of Sicilian vase painting, with the unusual feature of fully coloured painting in tempera applied after firing was complete.

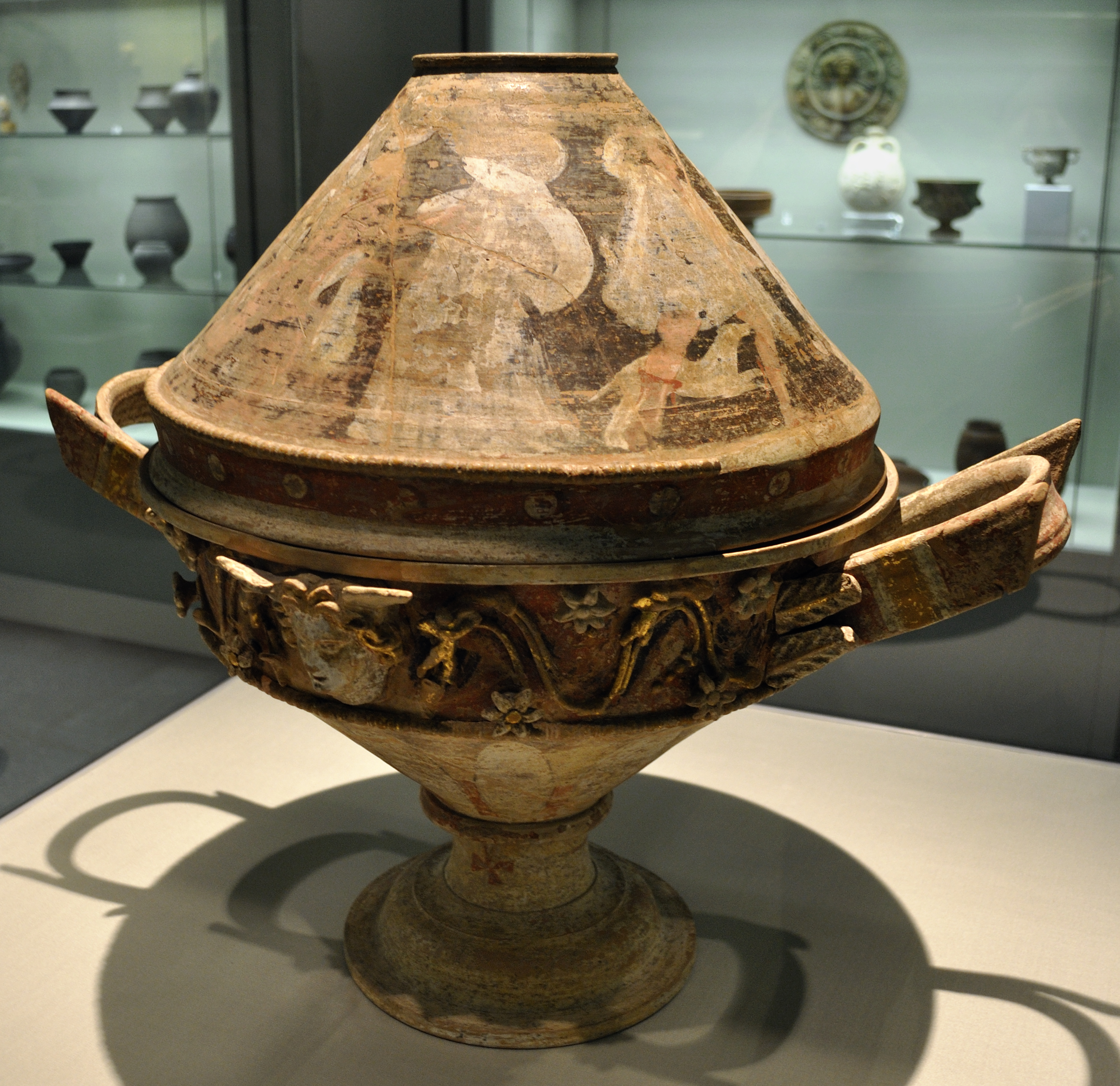
Centuripe Ware Lekanis, Hetjens-Museum, Düsseldorf

Cicero described it, perhaps with some exaggeration, as being by far the largest and richest city of Sicily, and as having a population of 10,000, engaged in the cultivation of an extensive territory. It appears to have suffered much in the war against Sextus Pompeius because of its loyalty to Octavian, but Octavian reconstructed and gave the inhabitants Roman citizenship.

The Imperial Roman age has left the most impressive monumental remains. Grandiose monumental ruins, a rich complex of sculptures, numerous inscriptions: a whole series of elements seem to mark the accomplishments of a local family that, in the 2nd century, came to express a consul, a son of one of the components of the entourage of the emperor Hadrian. A large number of monumental remains were lost forever due to the neglect of the past and systematic theft and plundering for collectors and collections of every where. It gradually declined in the late Empire.

Emperor Frederick II entirely destroyed the city in 1233 in punishment for its rebellion, the inhabitants deported to Augusta. King Charles I of Anjou razed it completely to the ground, and the city was rebuilt only in 1548 by Francesco I Moncada, the future Prince of Paternò.

The city was known as Centorbi until 1863. In 1943 during World War II and the liberation of Sicily the Battle of Centuripe saw the town captured spectacularly from the defending Germans by the 38th (Irish) Infantry Brigade although it suffered some damage.

== Demographics ==
As of 2026, the population is 4,981, of which 48.9% are male, and 51.1% are female. Minors make up 14.3% of the population, and seniors make up 27.0%.

Historical population

Year	Pop.	±%
1861	7,112	—
1871	7,453	+4.8%
1881	8,907	+19.5%
1901	11,187	+25.6%
1911	13,111	+17.2%
1921	15,222	+16.1%
1931	10,618	−30.2%
1936	10,802	+1.7%

Year	Pop.	±%
1951	11,020	+2.0%
1961	10,008	−9.2%
1971	8,172	−18.3%
1981	6,915	−15.4%
1991	6,612	−4.4%
2001	5,903	−10.7%
2011	5,599	−5.1%
2021	5,129	−8.4%

Source: ISTAT

=== Immigration ===
As of 2025, immigrants make up 4.3% of the total population. The 5 largest foreign countries of birth are Romania, Germany, Tunisia, Switzerland, and Cameroon.

== Sights ==
Many remains of the ancient city, mostly of the Roman period, still exist and numerous antiquities, including some fine Hellenistic terra-cottas, were discovered in casual excavations.

Other sights include the Chiesa Madre (17th century) and the ruins of the so-called Castle of Conradin, in fact a Roman mausoleum of the Imperial age.

=== Archaeological sites ===
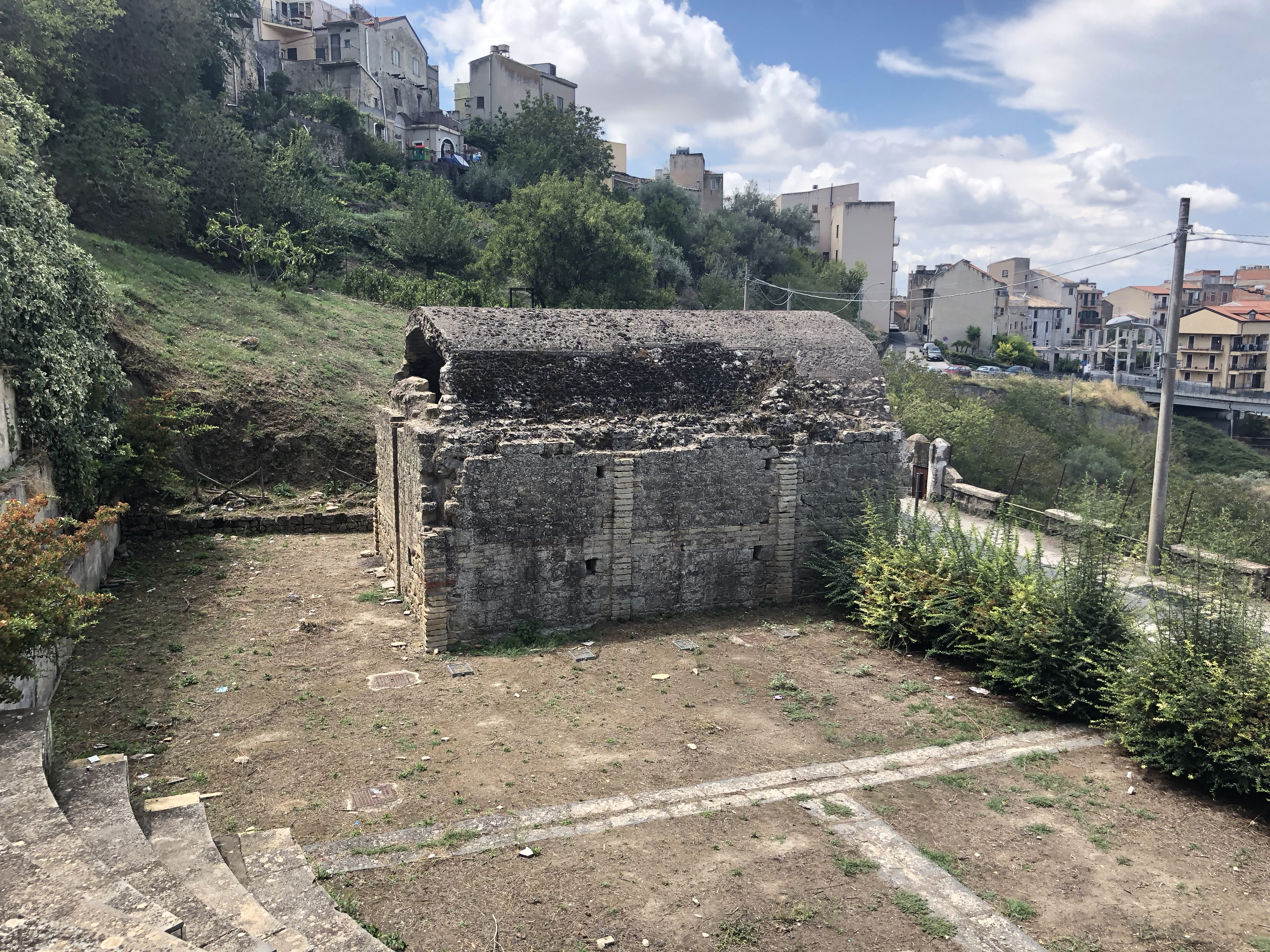
Nymphaeum and cistern

Centuripe and the surrounding territory are the subject of archaeological research and numerous sites have been found:

- Amara Water Zone: Thermal remains of the Hellenistic- Roman age
- Sorgiva Bagni: Roman spa remains
- District Agliastrello: remains of a town
- District Bagni: (to the north) Hellenistic necropolis
- District Casino: Necropolis from the Iron Age, with stone circle tombs, with multiple burials; used until the Hellenistic age
- District Cuba in Muglia: Prehistoric settlement and necropolis from the Neolithic age to the Ancient Bronze age
- District Difesa: Large ceramic kilns
- District Piano Pozzi: Remains of inhabited area (south-east) Hellenistic necropolis
- District Biliuzzo: Hellenistic necropolis
- Carcaci hamlet: rock necropolis; remains of the Bronze Age; Roman age structures
- Castellaccio: Hellenistic furnace; remains of a medieval castle
- Corradino Castle: Roman Mausoleum
- Monte Calvario: Remains of town
- Castiglione collection: Embankment wall
- Fondo Testai: ancient cistern
- Vallone Gelso: remains of inhabited areas, necropolis from the 8th century BC to the Hellenistic period
- Monte Porcello: Remains of Greek-Hellenistic settlement
- Mulino Barbagallo: monumental complex (ancient seat of the "Augustali") with marble statues of Augustus, Drusus, etc.
- Panneria: Roman house
- Piano Capitano: Extensive necropolis from the 8th century BC to the Hellenistic period
- Road Catenanuova to Centuripe: ancient furnace
- Road of Panaria: House of the masks and remains of inhabited areas
- Vallone Defesa: location of the ancient gymnasium

In the city centre:

- Hellenistic-Roman centre with walls, inhabited area and furnaces.
- Chiesa del Crocifisso: Hellenistic-Roman structures with mosaic "ancient rooms"
- La Dogana: Fountain-cistern of the Roman-imperial age

Ruins, walls and remains of buildings near the churches

- Chiesa del Crocifisso: embankment wall
- Church of the Maddalena: ancient wall
- Church of Santa Maria delle Grazie: ancient wall
- Mother Church: ruins
- Addolorata Church: ancient remains
- Colle dell'Annunziata
- Convent of Sant'Agostino: Ruins
- Fondo Calcerano: Ancient building
- The Ancient Stables
- Via Fragalà: ancient rooms
- Via Scipione: remains of a village

==== Roman bridge ====
Roman Centuripe was on an important route, the via frumentaria that connected Catania to the Tyrrhenian coast along the Simeto river; it joined Aetna (Paternò), Centuripe, Agyrium (Agira), Assorum (Assoro), Henna (Enna) and continued up to Termini Imerese. The strategic position of the city allowed the control both of this road and of that from the North continuing towards Leontini.

The discovery of a paved stretch of road along the Simeto river and some ruined sections of the destroyed Roman Bridge of Centuripe, forgotten for centuries due to a deviation of the river, have advanced the hypothesis of finding the via frumentaria to some scholars. The bridge is located near the Ponte Barca of Biancavilla and consists of four large segments aligned in the WNW/ESE direction, of a width of about 3 m and a length of 6–8 m each. The monument dates from the second century, probably linked to Quintus Pompeius Sosius Falco, curator of the viae Traianae between 108 and 112.

==== The Askos of Centuripe ====
In the 1820s an askos (flattened vase) dating to the first half of the 5th century BC was found (now in the archaeological museum of Karlsruhe) with the longest Sicel inscription found to date.

=== Archeological museum ===
In the town of Centuripe is the Regional Archaeological Museum of Centuripe, the museum contains the largest collection of Roman finds in central Sicily and important and rare statues of the emperors Hadrian and Augustus.

== Twin towns ==
- Lanuvio, Italy
