= Imachara =

Imachara (Greek: Ἱμιχάρα or Ἡμιχάρα, Ptol.), was an ancient city of Sicily repeatedly mentioned by Cicero among the municipal towns of the island. There is great discrepancy in regard to the form of the name, which is written in many manuscripts Macarēnsis or Macharēnsis; and the same uncertainty is found in those of Pliny, who also notices the town among those of the interior of Sicily. The precise location of Imachara is not known but has been and remains the subject of much scholarly debate. Even though Mirabella Imbaccari is still named in Sicilian as Màcara and its inhabitants are called macarisi, both deriving incontrovertibly from their corrispective Latin ascendants.

== History and location ==
From the manner in which it is spoken of by Cicero, it would seem to have been a town of some consideration, with a territory fertile in corn. That writer associates it with Herbita, Assorus, Agyrium (modern Agira), and other towns of the interior, in a manner that would lead us to suppose it situated in the same region of Sicily; and this inference is confirmed by Ptolemy, who places Hemichara or Himichara (evidently the same place) in the northeast of Sicily, between Capitium (modern Capizzi) and Centuripa (modern Centuripe). Hence Cluverius conjectured that it may have occupied the site of Traina, but this is wholly uncertain. Fazello and other Sicilian writers have supposed the ruins of an ancient city, which are still visible on the coast about 15 km north of Cape Pachynum, near the Porto Vindicari, in the comune of Noto, to be those of Imachara; but though the name of Macaresa, still borne by an adjoining headland, gives some color to this opinion, it is wholly opposed to the data furnished us by ancient authors, who all agree in placing Imachara in the interior of the island. The ruins in question, which indicate the site of a considerable town, are regarded by Cluverius (but equally without authority) as those of Ichana. Modern scholars still debate the location of the city. The editors of the Barrington Atlas of the Greek and Roman World tentatively place Imachara at the località of Vaccarra di Nicosia in the comune of Nicosia.
