= Narrow-gauge railways in Sicily =

Network of narrow-gauge railway lines property of FS in Sicily

Sicily had at one time an extensive narrow gauge railway network. The design work was begun under at the time of the provisional management of the Southern Railways, continued by the Rete Sicula (Sicilian Railways) and built by Ferrovie dello Stato (Italian State Railways), which spread over the territory of five provinces: Palermo, Trapani, Agrigento, Caltanissetta, Enna; today the FS narrow-gauge network is completely abandoned and only the Circumetnea railway survives.

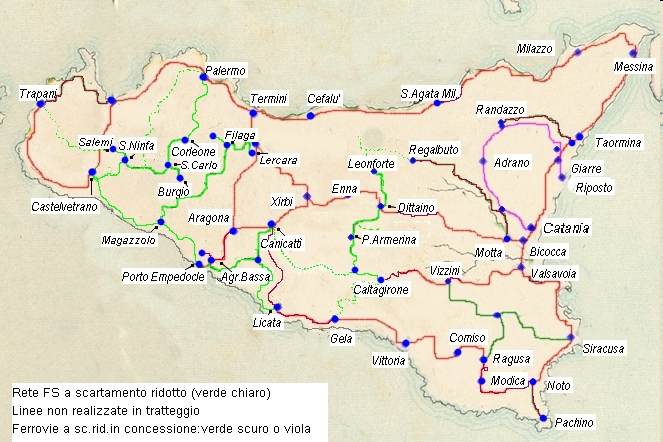
Map of narrow gauge railways in Sicily. Also shown is the planned Salemi-Trapani line, a project reworked after the First World War in favour of a line, built but not completed, between Salemi and Calatafimi.

== History ==
The design origins of some sections of the network date back to the 1870s; The construction of these railways was however started later and in some cases implemented so slowly to that construction was only completed in the 1960s only to be abandoned soon after.

The first narrow gauge railway, the Palermo-Corleone-San Carlo Railway was built by private investors; the first project of 1873, was for an 850mm gauge steam tramway but on 15 September 1879 (perhaps also as a consequence of the new "Baccarini law", a framework for the construction of new lines to complete the Sicilian railway network) which recommended the use of metre gauge and established the contribution to construction costs by local authorities, the Provincial Council of Palermo decided to build it as heavy rail. This decision was probably the basis for the subsequent, unfortunate, choice of the narrow gauge for all the other related lines, built subsequently. The primary aim was to be able to convey wines, agricultural products and fish from the ports of the Mediterranean to the regional capital, Palermo. The construction of the section from Palermo to Corleone was sub-contracted in June 1883 to the English entrepreneur Robert Trewhella. Work began on 20 April 1884. The extension towards Castelvetrano and the south coast was entrusted in concession to the Società Siciliana per le Ferrovie Economiche (Sicilian Economical Railway Company) on 11 December 1898; however the Corleone-San Carlo was inaugurated only on 21 May 1903. Traffic remained at good levels for the first section up to Corleone but was always limited on the second and this led to a period of provisional management by the State in 1906 and then the incorporation into the FS network as of 1922.

While the construction of the main standard gauge network continued steadily, the construction of the other secondary lines suffered long setbacks with the exception of the private Circumetnea Railway, built by the Società Siciliana per lavori pubblici, (the Sicilian Civil Engineering Company, of which Trewhella himself was a shareholder), opened between 1895 and 1898. The remaining lines to be built suffered continuous setbacks due to multiple factors, including disputes among the municipalities in exchange for their investment capital required the alignment to pass as close as possible to the town centre, the interests of foreign or national sulphur companies who wanted the lines to serve their mines and not least the Rete Sicula's priority to build standard gauge lines to the coast, in particular, Castelvetrano-Porto Empedocle and Agrigento-Palma di Montechiaro-Licata.

To resolve these conflicting interests, the government set up a Royal Commission in 1901. Its recommendations are considered to be the cause of the premature obsolescence of the network. Narrow gauge with minimum infrastructure was recommended in order to limit the cost. Extensive use was to be made of rack sections to shorten the route. The result was a mess of very slow and tortuous lines, subject to landslides, the absence of efficient signaling and operating systems, and above all no relation to any master plan.

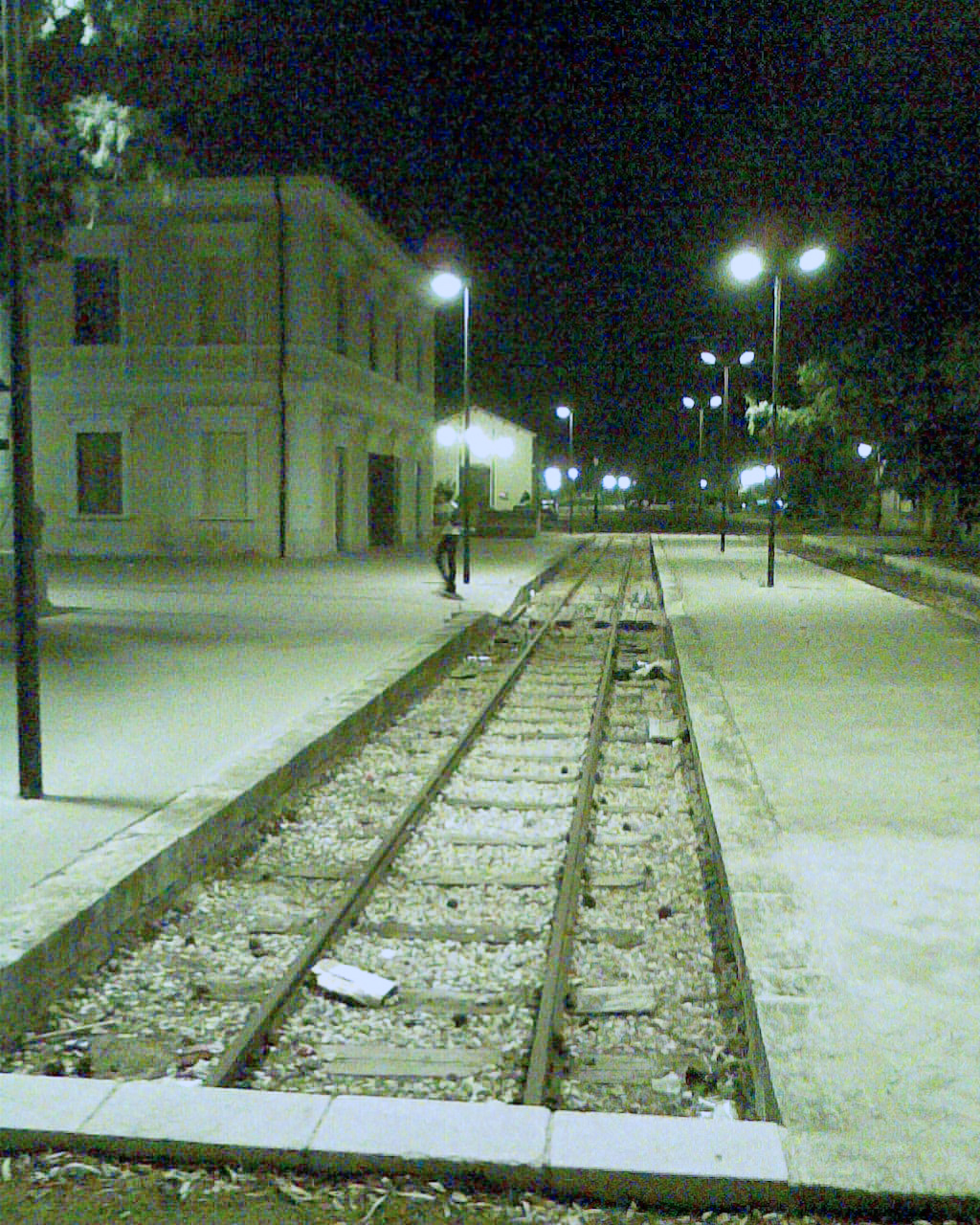
Marinella di Selinunte station, no longer served by trains

In the meantime, the construction of the network was further delayed by the nationalization, which happened for the Rete Sicula at the end of 1906. Under the aegis of the FS (State Railways) two sections from Castelvetrano station were finally put into service on 20 June 1910: the first 10 km (6.2 mi) of the line to San Carlo and Burgio up to Partanna and the first 13 km (8.1 mi) of the line to Porto Empedocle as far as Selinunte; on December 16, 1911, construction began on the 14 km (8.7 mi) Porto Empedocle-Siculiana section.

The first railway to be completed was the Canicattì-Licati, built between 1911 and 1915, to carry sulphur from the mines to the ports of Licata and Palma di Montechiaro and to transport the sulphur miners between the towns and the mines scattered between Canicattì and the sea.

Meanwhile, the construction of the coastal Castelvetrano-Agrigento line proceeded initially apace, reaching Sciacca in February 1914. However it took 9 more years to connect to the line built from Porto Empedocle and, inexplicably, the 9.4 km (5.8 mi) link between Porto Empedocle and Agrigento Bassa was only completed on 20 May 1951. This meant that for 28 years travellers lost time with a long transfer which made rail travel even more inconvenient.

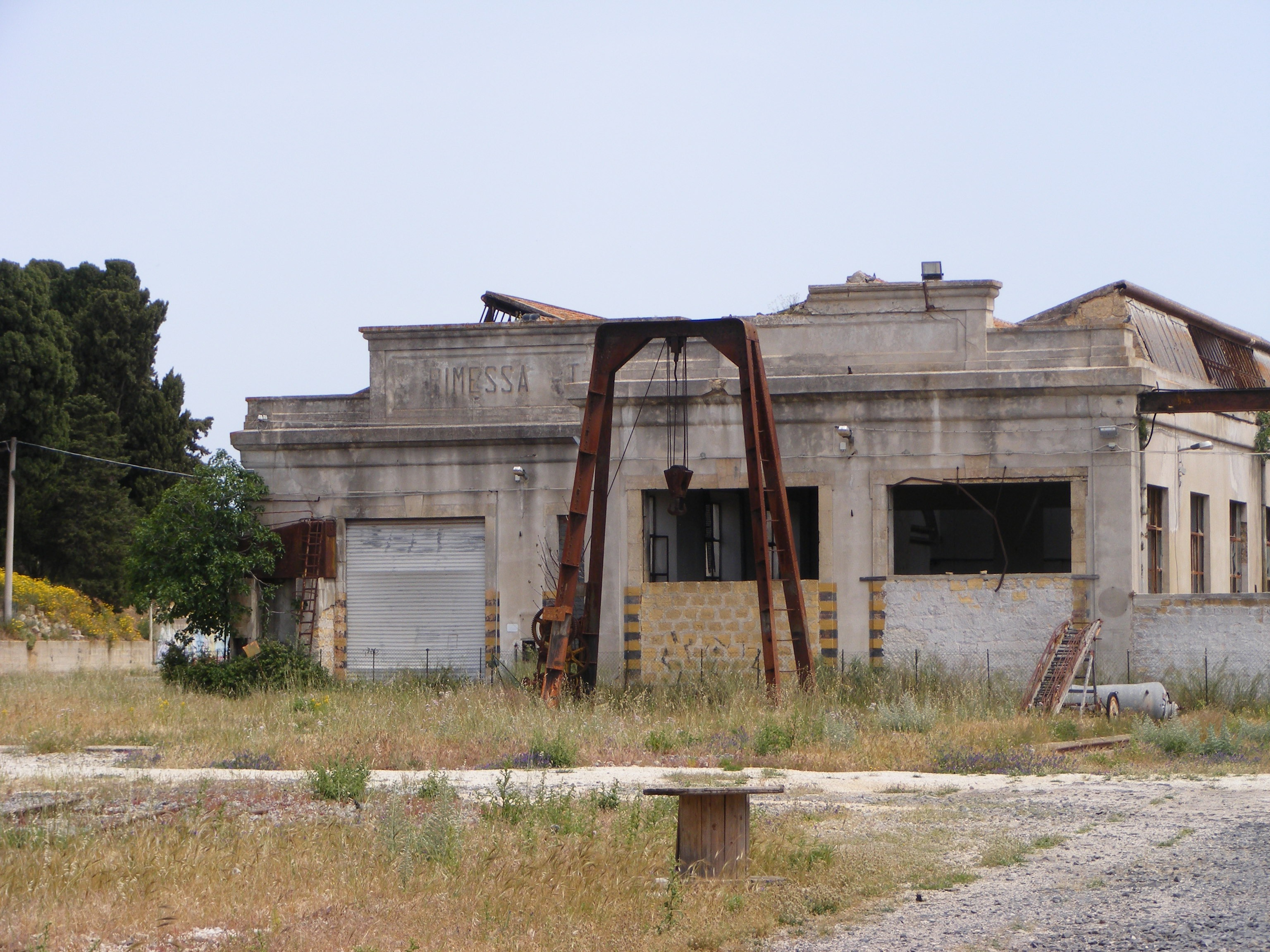
Castelvetrano narrow gauge railway shed

The other line that from Castelvetrano pointed towards Santa Ninfa, crossing various municipalities of the Belice Valley, then bending towards San Carlo and connecting to the line coming from Palermo (completing the north–south narrow-gauge transversal), after departure of the works of the first section proceeded more and more slowly and saw its completion only in 1931 and in 1935 it was enriched by the branch diverted to Santa Ninfa-Salemi, which in the initial intentions should have continued directly on Trapani, but after the design and construction of the Alcamo Dir.-Trapani via Milo, was then diverted to Calatafimi (construction that stopped after the construction of the headquarters and buildings). In the same period the continuation on Burgio was activated which should have reached the coast at Bivio Greci but which never saw its completion.

In 1912 the first rack section inaugurated between Lercara Bassa station on the Palermo-Catania line and the town of Lercara Friddi; it was the only large sulphur basin in the Palermo area and served the need for transport of miners and sulphur. Filaga was reached in 1914 but after that only in 1918 was the significant centres of Prizzi and Palazzo Adriano were only reached in 1918. Finally Magazzolo was connected in 1924 even though the priority was to connect the other important sulfur basin of Cianciana to Porto Empedocle for shipping out.

The other line from Castelvetrano headed towards Santa Ninfa, crossing various municipalities of the Belice Valley, then curving towards San Carlo and connecting to the line coming from Palermo (completing the north–south narrow-gauge connection) was opened in 1931. In 1935 the Santa Ninfa-Salemi branch was opened. Initially this line was intended to go all the way to Trapani, but a standard gauge line was built from Alcamo Diramazione to Trapani via Milo. Thus a new plan was hatched to extend the branch to Calatafimi. Only the headquarters and buildings were ever constructed. About that time work began on the continuation towards Burgio and Bivio Greci on the coast, but that was never completed either.

As for the rest of the central Sicily narrow-gauge network, it was to remain isolated from the Western network due to the abandonment of the construction of the Canicattì-Caltagirone railway. The first km in operation served the sulfur basins of Floristella, Grottacalda and Assoro-Leonforte with two lines: Dittaino-Piazza Armerina-Caltagirone and Dittaino-Leonforte. The first 13.856 km (8.610 mi) long section started from the courtyard of the Dittaiono station (formerly Assoro), and entered operation on April 25, 1912. The steep gradients meant that rack and pinion operation was required. The Strub system was chosen and installed between km 8.856 and 11.990 and between km 12.424 and 13.738. The second section of the line of 7.539 km (4.685 mi) came into operation on 29 August 1914 and connected Valguarnera to the Grottacalda station built near the Floristella-Grottacalda mining complex, equipped with Decauville junctions and railways, in which thousands of workers worked for the extraction and sulfur processing. The town of Piazza Armerina was only reached on September 7, 1920, demonstrating the priority given to freight services over passenger traffic. Caltagirone was reached only in 1930 and, moreover, the construction was done so cheaply that the line was beset with subsidence and landslides which often interrupted traffic and caused derailments. In 1918 the first section of the railway to Assoro and Leonforte was opened with a view to continuing towards the Valle del Salto and Nicosia with an intermediate station, Bivio Paternò, from which a branch line would descend towards the Simeto valley to reach the Circumetnea railway. Also in this case the works proceeded slowly, ending in 1923 with the arrival of the railway in Leonforte. Most of the trackbed of the next section towards Nicosia was completed but no track was ever laid.

Meanwhile, starting from the 1920s, the export of sulfur had entered an irreversible crisis (due to US competition which had monopolized the markets) and therefore many of the reasons for which so many routes had been planned had disappeared; it would therefore have been useful to review the entire design of the railway lines, abandoning those no longer useful, modernizing the existing ones with better routes. It was preferred to continue to wearily build what had been planned but then to abandon it to the weeds. The remaining section of the Dittaino-Leonforte towards Nicosia was partly built but the track was never laid; the branch Junction Paternò-Regalbuto-Paternò-Motta Sant'Anastasia dragged itself between postponements and reworkings. Finally only in the southern part was built to standard gauge, like Regalbuto-Catania and opened entirely much later, in 1952 without any connection to ensure it even minimal passenger traffic from Leonforte and Agira. The Caltagirone-Piazza Armerina was opened only in 1930 with the provision of a connection to San Michele di Ganzaria of the Canicattì-Caltagirone railway which was then being built, but was never completed or opened. The construction of the Santa Ninfa-Salemi-Trapani was also begun (which logicshould have been built with standard gauge) but after the opening of the first section and the construction of a second one that was never opened, it was abandoned forever.

Between 1928 and 1930 another project was started, which, even if mostly completed, never went into operation; that of the Palermo-San Cipirello-Camporeale-Salaparuta line, connecting to the Castelvetrano-San Carlo line at San Carlo. The friezes that indicate the year VIII of the Fascist era on the bridges before the Camporeale station bear witness to the successful execution of the project. The track was laid between Palermo and Monreale before the Second World War, but the I.G.M. map of 1951 still showed the section as "railway under construction".

The thirties also saw the beginning of the construction of the 45.5 km (28.3 mi) long railway from Caltagirone to Gela (then called Terranova), approved in 1911 and included among those of four narrow-gauge projects that would have reduced the total distance from Catania (albeit with transhipment) to about 135 km (84 mi), much shorter than the itineraries via Canicattì (231 km [144 mi]) and via Siracusa / Ragusa (268 km [167 mi]). Appropriately, however, on November 24, 1921, the Royal Decree no. 1696 had transformed the project to the ordinary gauge (together with that of the building for Canicattì, which was partly already built to a narrow gauge). Some engineering work was done, but the outbreak of the Second World War in 1939 stopped everything. In the early fifties the project was updated once again. The works began in April 1952 and the opening took place in November 1979. Of the whole program, this last section of the network, built to standard gauge, is the only one that survived.

Although construction continued tirelessly until the post-war period, nothing was done to modernize the existing one or speed up the service except for the introduction, in 1950, of 25 new RALn60 railcars on some lines, while the rest was abandoned to incredibly long distances of the old steam traction (average speed between 15 and 20 km/h (9.3 and 12.4 mph)). The cuts and closures began in the mid-1950s and continued up to the beginning of the sixties. The group of central railways disappeared at the beginning of the seventies and the last line closed its doors at the end of 1987. Some closure made sense since the industrial purpose for which they were created had ceased to exist, for others such as Dittaino-Piazza Armerina-Caltagirone, Castelvetrano-Salaparuta and Castelvetrano-Agrigento it was a questionable measure given that the existing commuter traffic remained at good levels and was forcibly diverted due to the lack of speeding up of services and lines, sometimes impossible timetables and very long interruptions for relatively simple jobs.

=== Opening dates for the operation of individual sections of the network ===
The dates each section opened are shown below.

- Palermo-Corleone-San Carlo Railway :
  - up to Corleone: 20 December 1886,
  - Corleone-San Carlo: May 21, 1903.
- Agrigento-Naro-Licata railway :
  - Canicattì - Naro: February 28, 1911,
  - Naro - Camastra: 4 December 1911,
  - Camastra - Licata: 7 October 1915,
  - Girgenti - Favara: May 8, 1921,
  - Favara-Margonia: December 30, 1921,
  - Agrigento Bassa station (formerly Girgenti) - Agrigento Centrale: 1933 (dual-gauge section).
- Castelvetrano-Porto Empedocle railway :
  - Selinunte - Castelvetrano: June 20, 1910,
  - Siculiana - Porto Empedocle: December 16, 1911,
  - Selinunte - Sciacca: 21 February 1914,
  - Cattolica Eraclea - Siculiana: June 16, 1915
  - Ribera - Cattolica Eraclea: February 26, 1917,
  - Sciacca-Ribera: 2 July 1923,
  - Porto Empedocle - Agrigento Bassa: 20 May 1951 (dual-gauge section).
- Lercara-Filaga-Magazzolo Railway
  - Lercara Alta - Lercara Bassa 20 August 1912,
  - Lercara Alta - Filaga: 12 September 1914,
  - Filaga-Contuberna: May 10, 1921,
  - Contuberna - Bivona: 11 November 1923;
  - Bivona - Alessandria della Rocca: 1 September 1924,
  - Cianciana - Alessandria della Rocca: July 15, 1922,
  - Cianciana - Magazzolo: December 3, 1921.
- Lercara-Filaga-Magazzolo branch :
  - Filaga - Prizzi: March 16, 1918,
  - Prizzi - Palazzo Adriano: 21 August 1920.
- Dittaino-Piazza Armerina-Caltagirone Railway
  - Assoro station - Grottacalda mines: April 25, 1912,
  - Grottacalda station - Valguarnera: 29 August 1914,
  - Valguarnera - Piazza Armerina: 7 September 1920,
  - Piazza Armerina - Caltagirone: 1930.
- Dittaino-Leonforte Railway
  - Dittaino - Cavalcatore: March 8, 1918,
  - Cavalcatore - Assoro: May 12, 1921,
  - Assoro - Leonforte: 30 September 1923.

=== The second historical phase: closures ===
Construction, now under the control of the Ministry of Public Works, after the suspension during World War II, resumed very slowly at the beginning of the 1950s, when FS also made the only concrete attempt to relaunch some lines with the introduction of the RALn60 diesel railcar, a vehicle specifically built for Sicily. the positive experience led to a significant return of passengers, since it halved transport times. Indeed, ticket sales increased between 25 and 40% on the lines where it was put into operation and in the case of the Piazza Armerina-Caltagirone section even doubled) Unfortunately only 25 units were ever built so most lines were stuck with the slow steam traction. Furthermore, no modernization of the permanent way or operating systems was ever carried out, and often no routine maintenance of the lines was done, so line speeds became even lower than the usual 25 to 35 km/h (16 to 22 mph), frequently at walking pace, often with stopping and driving by sight, where landslides ate the territory at every storm. No wonder that as soon as it was possible, users looked for alternative means such as their own car, motorcycle or competing private bus line. In the fifties, in spite of the railcars' success in their limited operations, the politicians then in power decided that road transport was the future and closed sections even with good levels of ridership.

- Palermo-Corleone-San Carlo Railway : first February 1959 (entire line closed).
- Lercara-Filaga-Magazzolo Railway : first October 1959 (entire line closed).
- Agrigento-Naro-Licata railway: 28 September 1958 (cancellation of the service), 26 August 1959 (DPR 875 closing the entire line).
- Dittaino-Leonforte Railway: April 16, 1959 (entire section closed).
- Santa Ninfa-Salemi Railway : 1 July 1954 (suspension of the railway service).
- Castelvetrano-San Carlo-Burgio railway
  - (closure of the Salaparuta-San Carlo section): 1 February 1959,
  - (Castelvetrano-Salaparuta section) in operation until 15 January 1968; after the destruction of the Belice earthquake no longer reopened.
- Railway Dittaino-Piazza Armerina-Caltagirone :
  - (Piazza Armerina-Caltagirone section closes): 25 June 1969,
  - (closing of the Dittaino-Piazza Armerina section): 11 July 1971.
- Castelvetrano-Porto Empedocle railway :
  - (closure of the Porto Empedocle-Agrigento Bassa section): 23 February 1976,
  - (service suspended from Realmonte to Agrigento): December 1977,
  - (suspended service on the Ribera-Porto Empedocle section): spring 1978,
  - (closing of the remaining Castelvetrano-Sciacca-Ribera section): 1 January 1986.

== List of railways in the FS network ==
=== Railways that entered into operation, now closed ===
- Palermo Sant'Erasmo-Corleone-San Carlo railway
- Lercara-Filaga-Magazzolo railway with the Filaga-Palazzo Adriano branch
- Castelvetrano-Porto Empedocle railway
- Castelvetrano-Santa Ninfa-Salaparuta-San Carlo-Burgio railway
- Santa Ninfa-Salemi railway
- Dittaino-Piazza Armerina-Caltagirone railway
- Dittaino-Leonforte railway
- Agrigento-Margonia-Naro-Licata railway with the Margonia-Canicattì branch

=== Railways at least partially built that never operated ===
- Canicattì-Riesi-San Michele G.-Caltagirone railway
- Palermo Lolli-Camporeale-Salaparuta railway
- Salemi-Kaggera railway (planned extension of Santa Ninfa-Salemi)
- Leonforte-Nicosia railway (planned extension of the Dittaino-Leonforte)
- Santo Stefano di Camastra-Reitano-Mistretta railway

=== Railways designed but never built ===
- Salemi-Trapani railway (planned extension of Salemi-Kaggera)
- Nicosia-Randazzo railway (planned extension of Alcantara-Randazzo)
- Nicosia-Regalbuto railway (planned extension of the Regalbuto-Motta Sant'Anastasia)
- Fiumetorto-Nicosia railway (planned extension of Leonforte-Nicosia)
- Burgio-Magazzolo railway (planned extension of Castelvetrano-San Carlo-Burgio)
- Mistretta-Nicosia railway (planned extension of Santo Stefano di Camastra-Reitano-Mistretta)
- Burgio-Magazzolo railway (extension of Castelvetrano-Burgio)

== General features ==
The entire network was built to 950 mm (3 ft 1 3/8 in) gauge (also called Italian metric). The rails of the Vignoles type were 27 kg/m (54 lb/yd), in 12 m (39 ft) lengths, mounted on sleepers separated by a distance of 0.82 m (2 ft 8 in). The minimum radius of curvature was 100 m (330 ft), but on the Palermo-San Carlo there were also 60 m (200 ft). The gradients were generally contained between 25‰ and 30‰ which allowed adhesion operation. For steeper sections (up to 75‰), the Strub rack was installed. The speed of the trains on the rack sections was limited to 12 km/h (7.5 mph) for locomotive hauled trains and 20 km/h (12 mph) for railcars. The rack was engaged at a speed not exceeding 6 km/h (3.7 mph).

The traction was always steam for almost all the lines and until the closure except, from 1950 and only for some lines, the use of the diesel one for passenger trains. At the end of the 1920s there were experiments with experimental railcars (the RNe 8501 built by SNOS and the RNe 8901-8902 built by Fiat ) that did not lead to any series production. and only shortly before the final closure two four-axle FS RD.142 locomotive diesel locomotives with bogies were put into service on the Castelvetrano-Porto Empedocle line.

== Special operating rules ==
In the vast majority of cases, no type of railway signaling, traffic light or light was used for the protection of the stations or for the regulation of railway traffic. Only in the case of stations common to the normal gauge or crossroads were railway signals of the same type FS used. The stations were equipped with an indicator pole in the stations equipped with switches for the possibility of making an intersection. In this case the train had to stop at the pole and wait to be called with hand signals in order to enter the station. The entrance to the switch was to take place at speeds not exceeding 15 km/h (9.3 mph). The stations were equipped with telephones and the movement of trains took place with the joint regime exchanged between the capitreno. Later the block system with single management was adopted.

A peculiar characteristic of the rolling stock of the network was that of having adopted the Hardy continuous automatic brake which worked by exploiting not compressed air but vacuum, that is, with air extracted from the brake duct. This system is the one still in use today on British railways.

=== Narrow gauge engine sheds ===
- Sant'Erasmo
- Lercara Alta
- Castelvetrano
- Dittaino
- Piazza Armerina
- Porto Empedocle
- Licata

=== Motive power ===
- FS RALn 60 railcar
- FS steam locomotives R.301, R.302, R.370, R.401, R.402
- FS diesel locomotive RD.142
