= Ichana =

Ancient town of Sicily

Ichana (Greek: Ἴχανα), was an ancient city of Sicily, which, according to Stephanus of Byzantium, held out for a long time against the arms of the Syracusans, whence he derives its name (from the verb ἰχανάω, a form equivalent to ἰσχανάω), but gives us no indication of the period to which this statement refers. The "Ichanenses" (people of Ichana), however, are mentioned by Pliny (iii. 8. s. 14) among the stipendiary towns of the interior of Sicily, though, according to some scholars, the true reading is "Ipanenses" (people of Hippana, another ancient town in Sicily). In either case we have no clue to the position of the city, and it is a mere random conjecture of Cluverius to give the name of Ichana to the ruins of a city which still remain at a place called Vendicari, comune of Noto, a few miles north of Cape Pachynum (modern Capo Passero at the southeast corner of the island), and which were identified by Tommaso Fazello as those of Imachara.
