= Memory wheels =

Mnemonic and concept-generative devices

Memory wheels or combinatory wheels are mnemonic, metaphysical, symbolic, and concept-generative devices first developed in 1582 by Renaissance philosopher Giordano Bruno, as part of his system of ars memoriae (art of memory). They consist of rotating concentric discs inscribed with letters, images, or concepts, designed to generate permutations for both mnemonic and metaphysical purposes. Bruno's designs draw on earlier mnemonic and combinatorial systems, particularly those developed by Ramon Llull, whose rotating diagrams served as a model for symbolic generation and divine contemplation. Bruno's wheels reflect a broader Renaissance shift to the development of structured symbolic tools and an intense interest in mnemonic systems.

== Structure ==
A typical memory wheel consists of 4–6 concentric circles, each divided into equal segments (varies between 30 and 60 segments). The entire memory system could contain up to 150 symbolic segments in total, distributed across the various wheels. When rotated, these rings form new symbolic combinations. Bruno's systems have been interpreted as not only encoding knowledge but to simulate the structure of the universe itself. By organising symbolic elements into layered, rotating configurations, they reflected the relationships between natural phenomena, celestial influences, and intellectual principles. The memory wheels thus functioned as both mnemonic devices and metaphysical models, designed to reveal the hidden correspondences linking the physical, cosmic, and spiritual realms. Indeed, according to Frances Yates, Bruno's wheels were "not merely [for] mnemonic functions; they were a means of expressing the total structure of reality by rotating and combining symbols from the elemental, celestial, and intellectual realms." According to scholars such as Yates, the goal extended beyond memorisation and included the generation of new meaning through recombination.

== Utilisation ==
Firstly, the discs are rotated in a systematic combinatorial sequence which produced all possible alignments of symbols across the rings. This method, adapted from Ramon Llull's logical diagrams, enabled Bruno to algorithmically generate thousands of symbolic configurations through the alignment of different symbolic elements from the various rings; these rings were organized according to ontological or cosmological hierarchies such as elemental, celestial, and intellectual realms—structured in concentric relation. In consequence, each alignment creates a unique combination, which will then be visualised and internalised by the user. This visualisation will then be used to store or recall information, or to explore conceptual relationships

For instance, in one wheel described in De umbris idearum, Bruno associates mythological figures such as Arcadian king, Lycaon or Apollo with specific actions and attributes e.g., "Lycaon at a banquet with a chain," or "Apollo and Python with a belt" in order to generate symbolic combinations that function as mnemonic images.

== Influence ==
Bruno's use of rotating memory wheels, combining classical mnemonics with Lullian combinatorics, helped bridge Renaissance memory techniques with early ideas in symbolic logic. Paolo Rossi places Bruno's wheels in a pre-history of symbolic reasoning, seeing them as a transitional form between memory systems and logical systems. His work influenced Leibniz as noted by Frances Yates, who wrote "a link between the memory art of Bruno and the logical methods of Leibniz," noting that Bruno's use of revolving symbolic wheels "foreshadow[ed] the rational combinations of symbols which Leibniz envisaged."

Some scholars argue it also contributed to the development of scientific method in early modern Europe. Indeed, Gopal Sarma argues that Bruno's adaptation of the art of memory, combining symbolic structures with logical operations, reflects an early step in the intellectual trajectory that would give way to the development of the scientific method. As stated “It may surprise readers that Gottfried Leibniz, who most know as being the co-inventor of the infinitesimal calculus, was one of the foremost figures in methodological innovation. Indeed, his role during the 17th century par- alleled that of Bruno“
