= Remigio of Florence =

Remigio of Florence can refer to two people:

- Remigio dei Girolami (1235–1319), an Italian Dominican theologian
- Remigio Nannini (1518/1521 – 1580), an Italian Dominican scholar and editor
