= FS class R.301 =

FS Class R.301
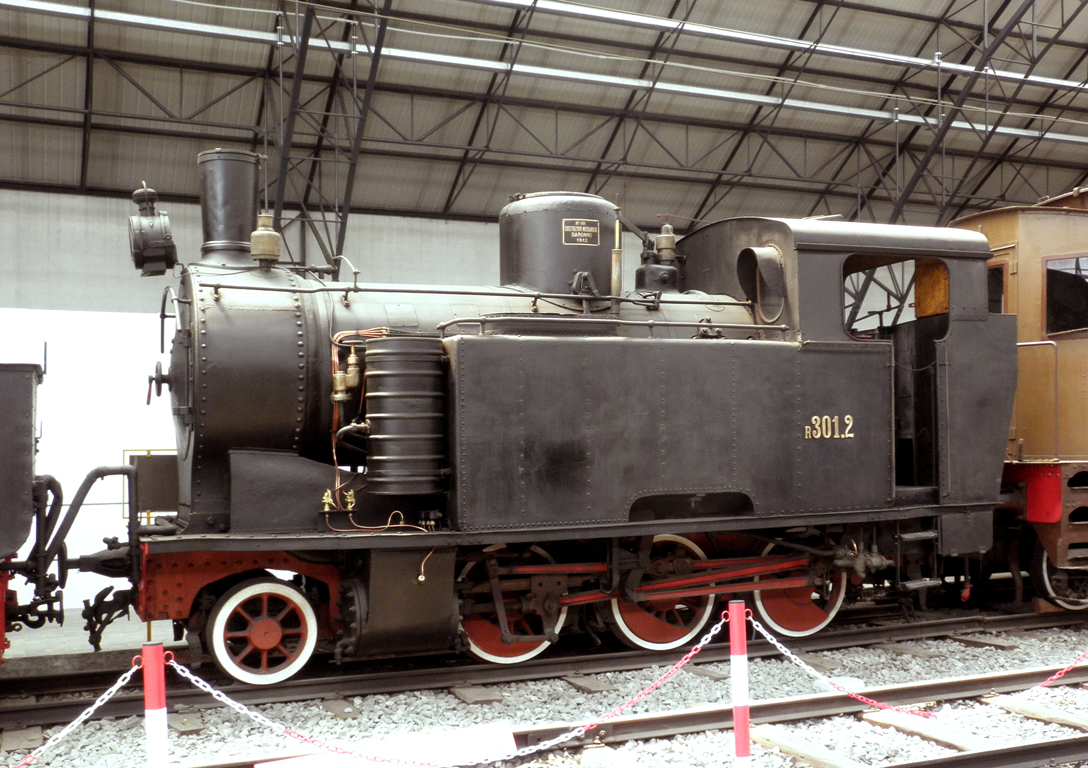
- R.301 locomotive in the Museo Nazionale Scienza e Tecnologia Leonardo da Vinci, Milan
Type and origin
- Power type: Steam
- Builder: Costruzioni Meccaniche di Saronno (15); Società Italiana Ernesto Breda (4); Gio. Ansaldo & C. (4); Officine Meccaniche (10)
- Build date: 1912–1914
- Total produced: 33
Specifications
- Configuration
  - Whyte: 2-6-0T
  - UIC: 1′C n2t
- Gauge: 950 mm (3 ft 1 3/8 in)
- Leading dia.: 700 mm (2 ft 3 1/2 in)
- Driver dia.: 950 mm (3 ft 1 3/8 in)
- Wheelbase
  - Axle spacing (Asymmetrical): 1,750 mm (5 ft 8 7/8 in); 1,250 mm (4 ft 1 1/4 in); 1,250 mm (4 ft 1 1/4 in)
  - Engine: 4,250 mm (13 ft 11 3/8 in)
- Length
  - Over headstocks: 6,428 mm (21 ft 1 1/16 in)
  - Over buffers: 7,428 mm (24 ft 4 7/16 in)
- Height: 3,700 mm (12 ft 1 11/16 in)
- Axle load
  - Leading: 5.1 t (5.0 long tons; 5.6 short tons)
  - Coupled: 10.3 t (10.1 long tons; 11.4 short tons)
- Adhesive weight: 30.9 t (30.4 long tons; 34.1 short tons)
- Service weight: 36.0 t (35.4 long tons; 39.7 short tons)
- Fuel type: Coal
- Fuel capacity: 1.5 t (1.5 long tons; 1.7 short tons)
- Water cap.: 4.5 m^{3} (990 imp gal; 1,200 US gal)
- Boiler
  - Pitch: 2,160 mm (7 ft 1 1/16 in)
- Boiler pressure: 12 kgf/cm^{2} (11.8 bar; 171 psi)
- Cylinders: Two, outside
- Cylinder size: 380 mm × 450 mm (14 15/16 in × 17 11/16 in)
Performance figures
- Maximum speed: 50 km/h (31 mph)
- Power output: 320 hp (239 kW)
- Tractive effort: 6,750 kgf (66.2 kN; 14,900 lbf)
Career
- Locale: Sicily; Somaliland; Eritrea; Tripolitania; Cyrenaica

The R.301 locomotive was a narrow gauge 2-6-0T steam locomotive for passenger and freight service that served on the Sicilian narrow gauge railway network and of the former colonies, Eritrea and Libya.

== History ==
The R.301 (R signifies narrow gauge) locomotives were designed and built in the 1910s by the Material and Traction Service of the FS in Florence for the FS' narrow gauge lines then under construction. The first batch of fifteen R.301s, built by Costruzioni Meccaniche di Saronno (CEMSA), was delivered to the FS in 1912.

In the following years, the fleet was enlarged by an additional eighteen units whose construction was split between Società Italiana Ernesto Breda of Milan, Gio. Ansaldo & C. of Sampierdarena, and Officine Meccaniche of Milan. The locos were distributed between the depots of Palermo S.Erasmo, Castelvetrano, and Porto Empedocle.

After 1918 thirteen R.301s were diverted to colonial railways:

- nos. 12, 13, 14, 25 and 26 to Tripolitania when new;
- nos. 21, 22, 32 and 33 to Cyrenaica in 1918;
- nos. 05 and 07 to Somalia in 1926, and
- nos. 15 and 31 went to Eritrea, where they were later joined by the two from Somalia, and all four became Eritrean Railways 301.001 to 301.004.

In 1922 a superheated version of the R.301 loco, the R.302, was introduced. This locomotive was also produced by CEMSA. The performance of the R.302s exceeded expectations, so the decision was taken to convert a batch of twenty R.301 locomotives into R.302s. The work was completed in the mechanical and naval workshops of Pietrarsa by 1927. The FS renumbered them from 023 to 042.

The R.301s acquitted themselves well in terms of reliability and performance both in Sicily and the colonies. The R.301.01 was sold to the Ferrovia Alifana in 1944.

== Design ==
The R.301s were designed to solve the operational problems of the preceding locomotive designs, above all the poor performance of four axle, rigid wheelbase R.401s which damaged the track in the numerous curves typical for narrow gauge alignments. The choice of the 2-6-0 wheel arrangement made it possible to limit the axle load to below 11 tons for the coupled wheels, and the fitted Bissel truck improved curvature on bends.

The locomotives were also equipped with large water tanks of 4.5 m^{3} (990 imp gal; 1,200 US gal) capacity to ensure a sufficient range. Upon testing, the R.301s exceeded expectations; on a constant slope of 25‰ (2.5%, 1-in-40) and curves with a radius of 100 m (330 ft), they were able to haul 90 t (89 long tons; 99 short tons) at 25 km/h (16 mph)

The boiler of the R.301 had a 74.5 m^{2} (802 sq ft) heating surface and the cylinders had a bore of 380 mm (14 15/16 in), a stroke of 450 mm (17 11/16 in), which gave a starting tractive effort of 6,750 kgf (66.2 kN; 14,900 lbf).

The locomotives were equipped with Hardy vacuum brake. This highly reliable system creates vacuum in the pipe by the use of a steam ejector and has no moving parts.

The only defect of the R.301, is the asymmetry of the running gear, which made the locos unidirectional.

=== Home sheds ===
- Deposito Locomotive di Castelvetrano
- Deposito Locomotive di Palermo Sant'Erasmo
- Deposito Locomotive di Licata
- Deposito Locomotive di Piazza Armerina
- Deposito Locomotive di Porto Empedocle

== Preserved locomotives ==
- R.301.2: Milan Museum of Science and Technology
- R.301.27: Exposed until 2009 on the seafront of Marsala, moved to the area of the Associazione Carristi d'Italia 2022, abandoned at Castelvetrano station.
- R.301.001, R.301.003, R.301.004: (ex FS R301.005/015/031) incorporated in the Eritrean railway fleet.
