= Assorus (Sicily) =

- Location within Sicily Location within Mediterranean
- 37°37′28″N 14°25′20″E
- Type: City
- Location: Assoro, Enna, Sicily, Italy

Assorus or Assoros (Ancient Greek: Ἄσσωρος), or Asserus or Asseros (Ἄσσηρος), also known as Assorium or Assorion (Ἀσσώριον), was a city of the interior of ancient Sicily, situated about halfway between Agyrium and Enna. It was a city of the Siculi, and appears never to have received a Greek colony. In 396 BCE it is mentioned by Diodorus as the only Siculian town which remained faithful to Dionysius of Syracuse, at the time of the great Carthaginian expedition under Himilco. In consequence, we find Dionysius, after the defeat of the Carthaginians, concluding a treaty of alliance with the Assorini, and leaving them in possession of their independence. At this time it would seem to have been a place of some importance; but no subsequent mention of it occurs in ancient writers until the days of Cicero, in whose time it appears to have been but a small town, though retaining its municipal independence, and possessing a territory fertile in corn. It suffered severely, in common with the neighbouring towns, from the exactions of Verres. We learn from Pliny the Elder and Ptolemy, that it continued to exist under the Roman Empire. and the modern town of Assoro undoubtedly occupies the site, as well as retains, with little alteration, the name of Assorus.

According to Tommaso Fazello, the remains of the ancient walls, and one of the gates, were still visible in his time (16th century). It was situated on a lofty hill, at the foot of which flowed the river Chrysas (now called the Dittaino), the tutelary deity of which was worshipped with peculiar reverence by the Assorini, and inhabitants of the neighbouring cities. His temple was situated, as we learn from Cicero, at a short distance from the town, on the road to Enna; and so sacred was it deemed, that even Verres did not venture openly to violate it, but his emissaries made an unsuccessful attempt to carry off the statue of the deity in the night. Fazello asserts that considerable remains of this temple were still extant in his day; but the description he gives of them would lead us to suppose that they must have belonged to an ancient edifice of a different class.

The coins of Assorus bear on the reverse a standing figure, with the name annexed of Chrysas. They are found only of copper, and are evidently of late date, from the fact that the legends are in Latin.
