= Basilica di San Leone, Assoro =

Building in Assoro, Italy

Coordinates: 37.62837°N 14.42393°E

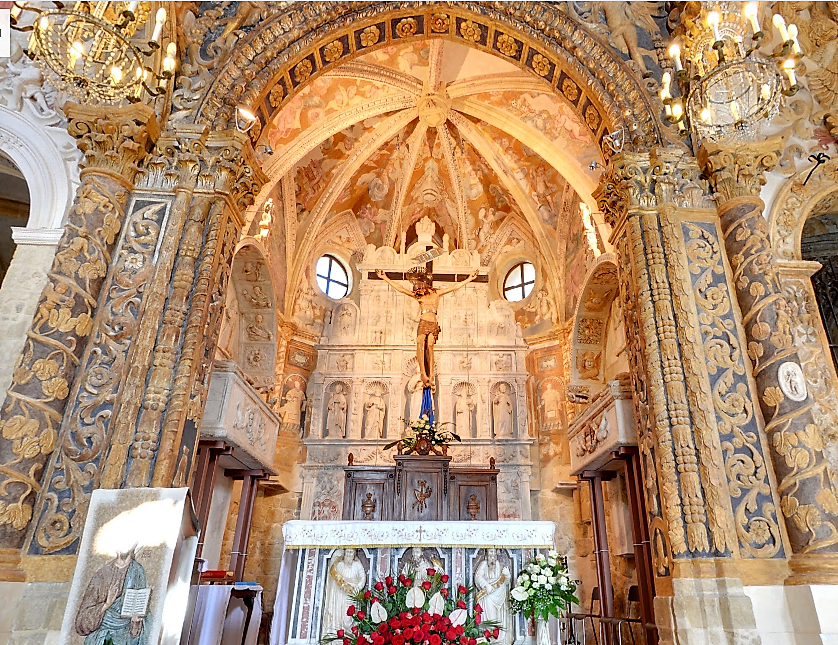
Apse and main altar of church of San Leone

San Leone is a Roman Catholic basilica church located on Via Crissa #294 in the town of Assoro, province of Enna, region of Sicily, Italy.

== History and architecture ==
The church of San Leone appears to have been founded in the late 12th-century as a royal chapel under the patronage of Constance I, Queen of Sicily, also known as Constance of Hauteville (Costanza d’Altavilla), the daughter of the Norman Roger II of Sicily. It became the "mother church" of town and nearby parishes in 1492, and seven years later elevated to the title of Basilica. In 1933, the church was declared a National monument.

The church has a Latin cross layout and has accumulated decoration over the centuries. The main elements are gothic: a central nave is tall and the facade has a circular window above a rounded window with a gently peaked central portal. The central nave is separated from the lateral aisles by richly decorated columns.

The interior contains a number of artworks from past centuries, including a wooden and stucco crucifix attributed to Antonello Gagini; a large sculpted polyptych associated with the baptismal font, also attributed to Gagini; a silver cross by Vincenzo Archifel; four medieval sarcophagi belonging to the Counts of Valguarnera; and a paleo-Christian crypt below the church.
