= Assoro =

Àssoro Àsaru (Sicilian)
- Comune
- Comune di Àssoro
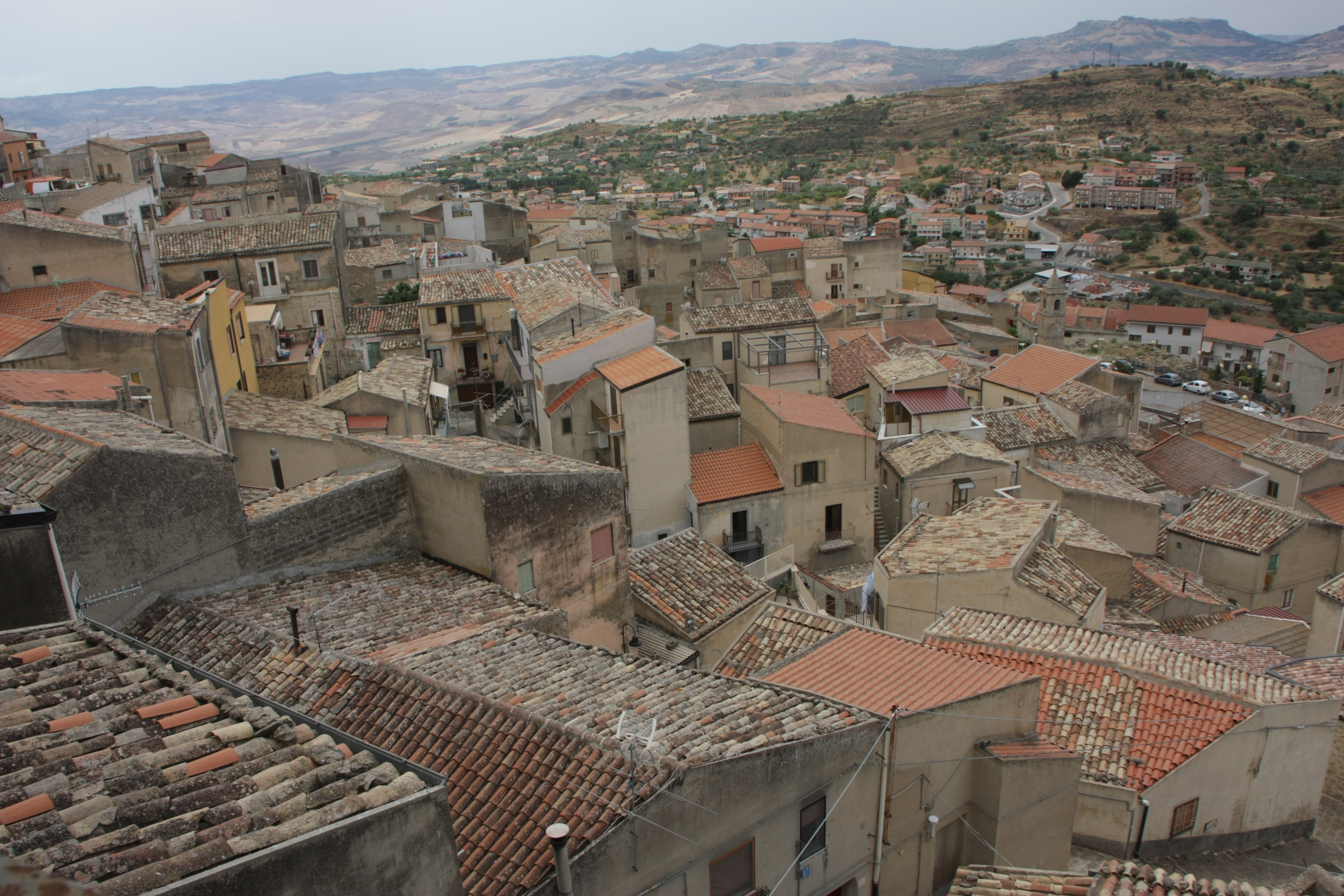
- View of Aidone

- Location of Àssoro in Italy Àssoro (Sicily)
- Coordinates: 37°38′N 14°25′E
- Country: Italy
- Region: Sicily
- Province: Enna (EN)
- Frazioni: Cuticchi, San Giorgio

Government
  - Mayor: Antonio Licciardo

Area
  - Total: 112.15 km^{2} (43.30 sq mi)
- Elevation: 850 m (2,790 ft)

Population (2026)
  - Total: 4,749
  - Density: 42.35/km^{2} (109.7/sq mi)
- Demonym: Assorini
- Time zone: UTC+1 (CET)
  - Summer (DST): UTC+2 (CEST)
- Postal code: 94010
- Dialing code: 0935
- Patron saint: Saint Petronilla
- Saint day: 31 May
- Website: Official website

Assoro (Sicilian: Àsaru, Latin: Assorus, Greek: Assoros) is a town and comune (municipality) in the province of Enna in the autonomous island region of Sicily in Italy. It has 4,749 inhabitants.

The town-site of Assoro occupies the site of ancient Assorus.

The fight to take the heights of Assoro during WWII figured prominently in Farley Mowat’s account of his wartime service, And No Birds Sang.

Among the main sights in the town is the 12th-century Basilica di San Leone.

== Demographics ==
As of 2026, the population is 4,749, of which 49.7% are male, and 50.3% are female. Minors make up 13.2% of the population, and seniors make up 27.3%.

Historical population

Year	Pop.	±%
1861	3,314	—
1871	3,304	−0.3%
1881	3,957	+19.8%
1901	6,325	+59.8%
1911	5,502	−13.0%
1921	5,576	+1.3%
1931	5,010	−10.2%
1936	4,969	−0.8%

Year	Pop.	±%
1951	5,563	+12.0%
1961	5,663	+1.8%
1971	5,167	−8.8%
1981	5,236	+1.3%
1991	5,319	+1.6%
2001	5,393	+1.4%
2011	5,366	−0.5%
2021	4,868	−9.3%

Source: ISTAT

=== Immigration ===
As of 2025, immigrants make up 5.0% of the total population. The 5 largest foreign countries of birth are Germany, Romania, Belgium, France, and Tunisia.
