= De umbris idearum =

Latin book of Giordano Bruno

On the Shadows of Ideas
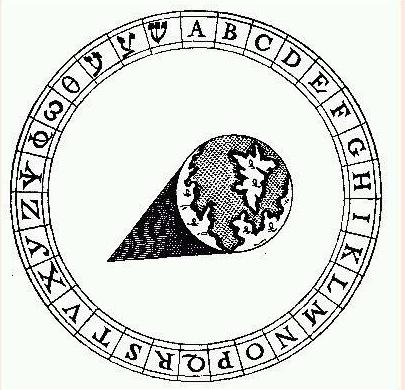
- Author: Giordano Bruno
- Original title: De Umbris Idearum
- Language: Latin
- Genre: philosophical treatise
- Publisher: Claude Chevallon
- Original text: De Umbris Idearum at Latin Wikisource

De Umbris Idearum (Latin for On the Shadows of Ideas) is a book written in 1582 by Italian Dominican friar and cosmological theorist Giordano Bruno. In this book, he proposes a system integrating mnemonics, Ficinian psychology, and hermetic magic. It is the first book he wrote covering the subject of memory, a topic on which he would focus the rest of his works.

== General and cited references ==
- Yates, Frances A. (1964). Giordano Bruno and the Hermetic Tradition. Chicago: University of Chicago Press. ISBN 9780226950020. OCLC 14600307.
