= Dittaino =

Location
- Country: Italy
- Region: Sicily

Physical characteristics
- Mouth: Simeto
  - coordinates: 37.4200°N 14.9812°E
- Length: 105 km (65 mi)

Basin features
- Progression: Simeto→ Ionian Sea

The Dittaino (Greek: Χρύσας; Latin: Chrysas) is a river of central Sicily which rises in the Heraean Mountains, not far from the modern towns of Gangi and Enna. It is 105 kilometres (65 mi) long.

After flowing through the territory of Assorus, where its tutelary divinity was worshipped with peculiar honors during the Greek civilization, and afterwards through that of Agyrium, it joins the Simeto in the plain of Catania, about 30 kilometres (19 mi) from its mouth.

== Hydronym ==
The modern name is the Sicilian version of Arabic vocable Wādī al-tīn, namely "The River of Sandstone".

== Geography ==
The length of the river is approximately 105 km across the Catania Plain. It originates in the mountains around Enna and is made up of several confluent branches: the Bozzetta river, 17 km long (with its various tributaries including the Girgia torrent), the Valguarnera torrent and the Crisa torrent which joins it at the Pirato railway station. From here the actual Dittaino originates, which ends its course as a right tributary of the Simeto river in the Melisimi district of Catania.

Like most Sicilian rivers, it has an unstable water regime and in periods of maximum rainfall it even overflows, flooding the surrounding countryside, sometimes causing serious damage to crops and means of communication.

It is largely bordered by the SS 192 (of the Dittaino Valley), the highway A19 Palermo-Catania and the Catania-Palermo railway. The course of the river passes through two provinces; the Province of Enna, where he was born and the Province of Catania. The valley of the Dittaino river, in the areas adjacent to the railway station on the Catania-Palermo line, today constitutes an area that polarizes growing construction and industrial activity.
