= Tommaso Fazello =

Italian Dominican friar, historian and antiquarian

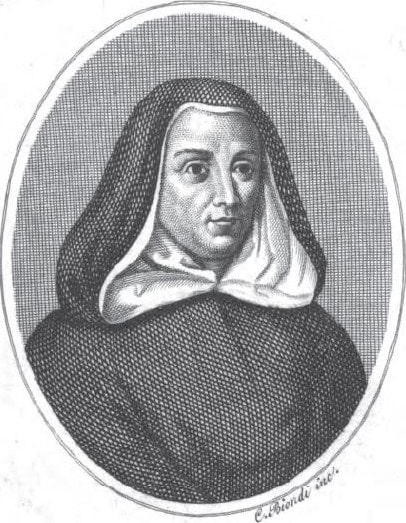
- Born: 1498; Sciacca, Kingdom of Sicily
- Died: 8 April 1570; Palermo, Kingdom of Sicily
- Occupations: Friar, historian, theologian, Catholic priest
- Movement: Renaissance
- Relatives: Girolamo Fazello

Tommaso Fazello (Neo-Latin Fazellus, 1498 – 8 April 1570) was an Italian Dominican friar, historian and antiquarian. He is known as the father of Sicilian history. He is the author of the first printed history of Sicily: De Rebus Siculis Decades Duae, published in Palermo in 1558 in Latin. He was born in Sciacca, Sicily and died in Palermo, Sicily.

He rediscovered the ruins of the ancient Sicilian towns of Akrai (modern Palazzolo Acreide), Selinus (modern Selinunte) and Heraclea Minoa. He also rediscovered the Temple of Olympian Zeus at Akragas (modern Agrigento).

In 1555, he taught at the Convent of San Domenico, Palermo, which later became the University of Palermo.

== Biography ==
Born at Sciacca in Sicily, Fazello studied at Palermo and entered the Dominican Order. He next studied at Rome and at Padua, where he received his doctorate. At Rome, he became friends with the humanist scholar Paolo Giovio, who encouraged him to write a history of Sicily. Returning to Palermo, Fazello undertook to teach philosophy and at the same time kept up his religious exercises. He so devoted himself to his studies that eventually he gave up all but one meal a day and reduced the number of hours he slept each night. His history of Sicily, De rebus siculis decades duae (Palermo, 1558), which was his only publication, included material on the ancient history and antiquities of Sicily, showing an immense personal knowledge of topography that allowed him to identify, on the basis of ancient authors, many of the major sites of Sicily. His work is still considered fundamental for the study of ancient Sicily.

== Opere ==
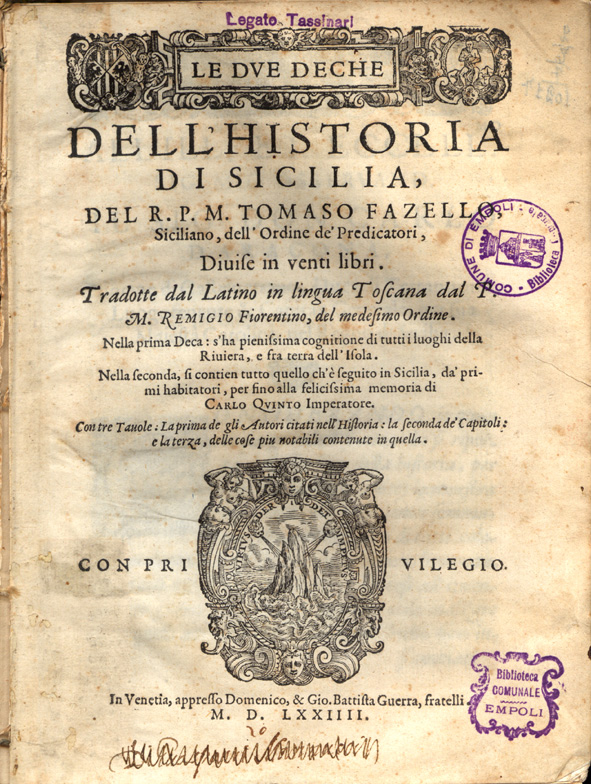
Dell'Historia di Sicilia, 1574

- Fazello, Tommaso (1558). "De rebus Siculis decades duae, nunc primum in lucem editae. His accessit totius operis index locupletissimus" (in Latin). Palermo. apud Ioannem Matthaeum Maidam et Franciscum Carraram.
- Fazello, Tommaso (1573). "Le due deche dell'historia di Sicilia" (in Italian). Translated by Remigio Nannini. Venezia. appresso Domenico, & Gio. Battista Guerra fratelli.

== Bibliography ==
- Contarino, Rosario (1995). "FAZELLO, Tommaso". Dizionario Biografico degli Italiani (in Italian). Vol. 45: Farinacci–Fedrigo. Rome: Institute of the Italian Encyclopaedia. ISBN 978-88-12-00032-6.
