= Remigio Nannini =

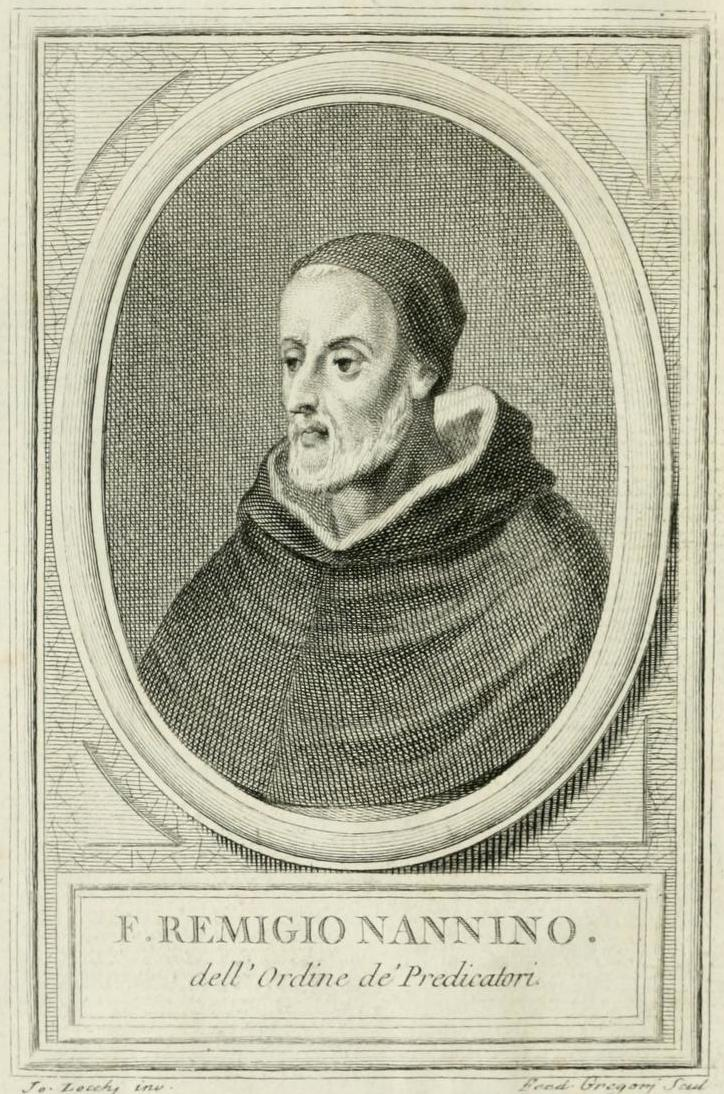
- Born: 1518; Florence, Republic of Florence
- Died: 3 October 1580 (aged 61–62); Florence, Grand Duchy of Tuscany
- Occupation: Writer, translator, friar
- Movement: Renaissance

Remigio Nannini (1518/1521–1580/81) was a Dominican friar, author, editor and translator. A scholar of striking versatility, Nannini's "fame as an author of profane literature [...] did not prevent him from being, at the same time, an active participant in the counter-Reformation [...] he was a Dominican friar who admired Machiavelli and Guicciardini."

== Life ==
Remigio Nannini was born in Florence in 1518 or 1521. He entered the Dominican Order at Santa Maria Novella when young, continuing his education there. He also studied in Padua under the theologian Sisto Medici. He published a book of Petrarchan verse in 1547. In 1553 he became magister theologiae. He edited Petrarch's De remediis, and translated several classical Roman historians, including Cornelius Nepos and Ammianus Marcellinus. After briefly living in Ancona, in 1556 Nannini settled in Venice.

In Venice Nannini worked with several publishers, but particularly with Gabriele Giolito de' Ferrari. He published a large number of vernacular devotional editions. From the mid-16th century, the Catholic Church forbade vernacular translations of the Bible, and this generally included the lectionary for daily Mass. However, Nannini's edition of the Epistles and Gospels was permitted. He also published collections of secular historical writers.

Nannini died in Florence in 1580.

== Works ==
- Rime [Verses]. Venice: Ludovico Domenichi, 1547.
- (tr.) Epistole d’Ouidio di Remigio Fiorentino diuise in due libri by Ovid. Venice, 1555.
- Orationi Militari. Venice, 1557.
- Orationi in materia civile e criminale. Venice, 1561.
- (ed.) Epistole et Evangeli che si leggono tutto l’anno alla messa. Venice, 1567.
- Considerationi civili sopra l'historie di M. Francesco Guicciardini e d'altri historici [Civil considerations on the history of M. Francesco Guicciardini and other historians]. Venice: Appresso Damiano Zenaro, 1582. Translated into English by W. Traheron as Ciuill considerations vpon many and sundrie histories, as well ancient as moderne, and principallie vpon those of Guicciardin, London: Imprinted by F.K. for Matthew Lownes, 1601
