= County of Sicily =

Sicily under Normans from 1071 to 1130

County of Sicily: Counté de Cesile (Norman); Comes Siciliae (Latin); Cuntia di Sicìlia (Sicilian)
- 1071–1130
- Coat of arms

- The county in 1112, before its merger with the mainland Duchy of Apulia and Calabria
- Capital: Palermo; 38°07′N 13°21′E
- Common languages: Official languages: Medieval Latin; Byzantine Greek (spoken in the Val Demone region and Salento); Siculo-Arabic (spoken in the regions of Val di Mazara and Val di Noto); Hebrew (spoken by a minority); Other spoken languages: Old Norman (court); Sicilian; Gallo-Italic of Sicily
- Religion: Roman Catholicism (official), Greek Orthodoxy, Islam, and Judaism
- Government: Monarchy
- Count
  - 1071–1101: Roger I
  - 1101–1105: Simon
  - 1105–1130: Roger II
- History
  - Established: 1071
  - Disestablished: 1130
Preceded by	Succeeded by
Muslim Sicily	Kingdom of Sicily
- Today part of: Italy; Malta

The County of Sicily was a Norman state comprising the islands of Sicily and Malta and part of Calabria from 1071 until 1130. The county began to form during the Norman conquest of Sicily (1061–91) from the Muslim Emirate, established by conquest in 965. The county is thus a transitional period in the history of Sicily. After the Muslims had been defeated and either forced out or incorporated into the Norman military, a further period of transition took place for the county and the Sicilians.

== History ==
The County of Sicily was created by Robert Guiscard in 1071 for his younger brother Roger Bosso. Guiscard himself had received the title Duke of Sicily (dux Siciliae) in 1059 from Pope Nicholas II as encouragement to conquer it from the Muslims. In 1061 the first permanent Norman conquest (Messina) was made and in 1071, after the fall of Palermo, the capital of the emirate and future capital of the county, Guiscard invested Roger with the title of count and gave him full jurisdiction in the island save for half the city of Palermo, Messina, and the Val Demone, which he retained for himself. Roger was to hold the county which comprised conquests yet to be made under Guiscard. In February 1091 the conquest of Sicily was completed when Noto fell. The conquest of Malta was begun later that year; it was completed in 1127 when the Arab administration of the island was expelled.

Robert Guiscard left Roger in an ambiguous relationship with his successors of the Duchy of Apulia and Calabria. After the death of Robert in 1085, Roger I obtained from the new duke, Roger Borsa, the whole rights over the castles in Calabria, the lordship of which he had previously shared with Robert Guiscard. In fact, the seat of Roger I's government was the Calabrian town of Mileto. According to historians Agostino Inveges and Matteo Camera, Roger I started to use the title "Great Count of Sicily and Calabria" since 1096. After the death of Roger I the major change was the transfer of the capital: Palermo became the capital in 1112, when Roger II was invested with the county, after the regency of the mother Adelaide del Vasto. With this change, Sicily come to be governed by the central government, while the Calabrian territories became a provincial administrative unit. During the reigns of Roger II of Sicily and William II of Apulia conflict broke out between the two Norman principalities, first cousins through Roger and Robert respectively. Through the mediation of Pope Calistus II and in return for aid against a rebellion led by Jordan of Ariano in 1121, the childless William ceded all his Sicilian territories to Roger and named him his heir.

When William died in 1127, Roger inherited the mainland duchy; three years later, in 1130 in Palermo, he merged his holdings to form the Kingdom of Sicily with the approval of antipope Anacletus II.

== List of counts ==
=== House of Hauteville ===
Sicily was granted, pending its Christian reconquest, to Robert Guiscard as "duke" in 1059 by Pope Nicholas II. Then Guiscard granted it as a county to his brother Roger.

Count	Portrait	Birth	Marriages	Death
Roger I 1071–1101		1031 son of Tancred of Hauteville and Fredisenda	Judith of Évreux; 1061; 4 children Eremburga of Mortain; 1077; 8 children Adelaide del Vasto; 1087; 4 children	1101; Mileto aged 70
Simon; 1101–1105		1093 son of Roger I of Sicily and Adelaide del Vasto	never married	1105; Mileto aged 12
Roger II; 1105–1130	Roger II	22 December 1095; Mileto son of Roger I of Sicily and Adelaide del Vasto	Elvira of Castile; 1117; 6 children Sibyl of Burgundy; 1149; 2 children Beatrix of Rethel; 1151; 1 child	26 February 1154; Palermo aged 59

== See also ==
- Kingdom of Africa
- Norman-Arab-Byzantine culture
