= History of Sicily =

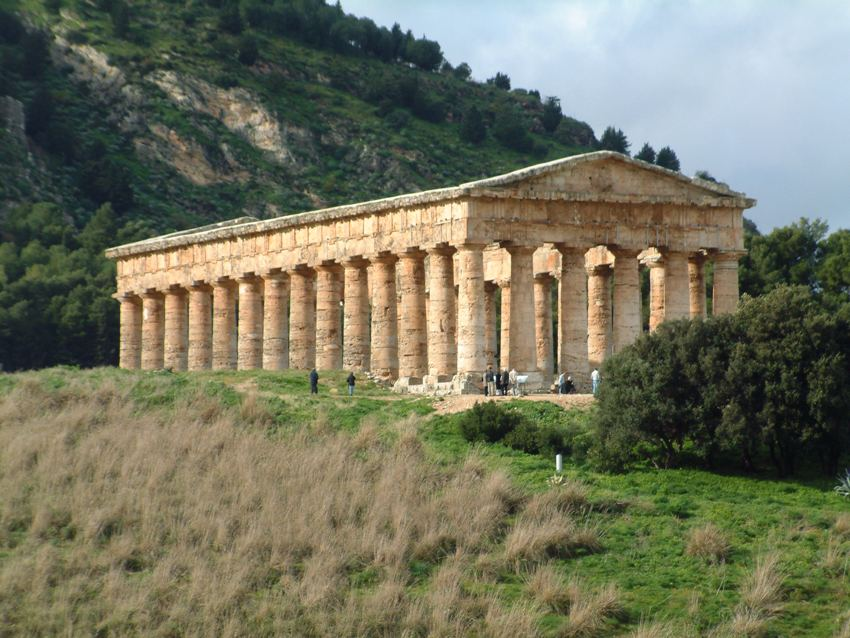
Temple of Segesta

The history of Sicily has been influenced by numerous ethnic groups. It has seen Sicily controlled by various powers, including Carthaginian, Greek, Roman, Vandal and Ostrogoth, Byzantine, Arab, Norman, Aragonese, Spanish, Austrians, but also experiencing important periods of independence, as under the indigenous Sicanians, Elymians, Sicels, the Greek-Siceliotes (in particular Syracuse with its sovereigns), and later as County of Sicily, and Kingdom of Sicily. The Kingdom was founded in 1130 by Roger II, belonging to the Siculo-Norman family of Hauteville. During this period, Sicily was prosperous and politically powerful, becoming one of the wealthiest states in all of Europe. As a result of the dynastic succession, the Kingdom passed into the hands of the Hohenstaufen. At the end of the 13th century, with the War of the Sicilian Vespers between the crowns of Anjou and Aragon, the island passed to the latter. In the following centuries the Kingdom entered into the personal union with the Spaniard and Bourbon crowns, while preserving effective independence until 1816. Sicily was merged with the Kingdom of Italy in 1861. Although today an Autonomous Region, with special statute, of the Republic of Italy, it has its own distinct culture.

Sicily is both the largest region of the modern state of Italy and the largest island in the Mediterranean Sea. Its central location and natural resources ensured that it has been considered a crucial strategic location due in large part to its importance for Mediterranean trade routes. Cicero and al-Idrisi described respectively Syracuse and Palermo as the greatest and most beautiful cities of the Hellenic World and of the Middle Ages.

== Prehistory ==
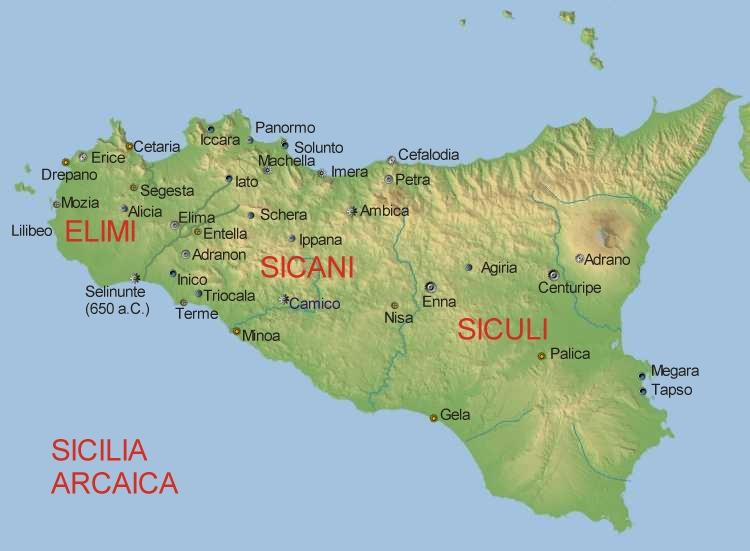
Regions of ancient Sicily

The indigenous peoples of Sicily, long absorbed into the population, were tribes known to ancient Greek writers as the Elymians, the Sicanians and the Sicels (from whom the island derives its name). Of these, the last was the latest to arrive and was related to other Italic peoples of southern Italy, such as the Italoi of Calabria, the Oenotrians, Chones, and Leuterni (or Leutarni), the Opicans, and the Ausones. It has been proposed that the Sicani were originally an Iberian tribe. The Elymi, too, may have distant origins from outside Italy, in the Aegean Sea area. The recent discoveries of dolmens dating to the second half of the third millennium BC, provide new insights to the composite cultural panorama of prehistoric Sicily.

The late prehistory of Sicily was complex and involved interactions between multiple ethnic groups. However, the impact of two influences remains clear: the Europeans coming from the north-west – for example, the peoples of Bell Beaker culture (bearers of the dolmens culture, recently discovered in this island and dating back to the Neolithic Bronze Age), and that from the eastern Mediterranean. Complex urban settlements become increasingly evident from around 1300 BC.

=== The Phoenicians ===
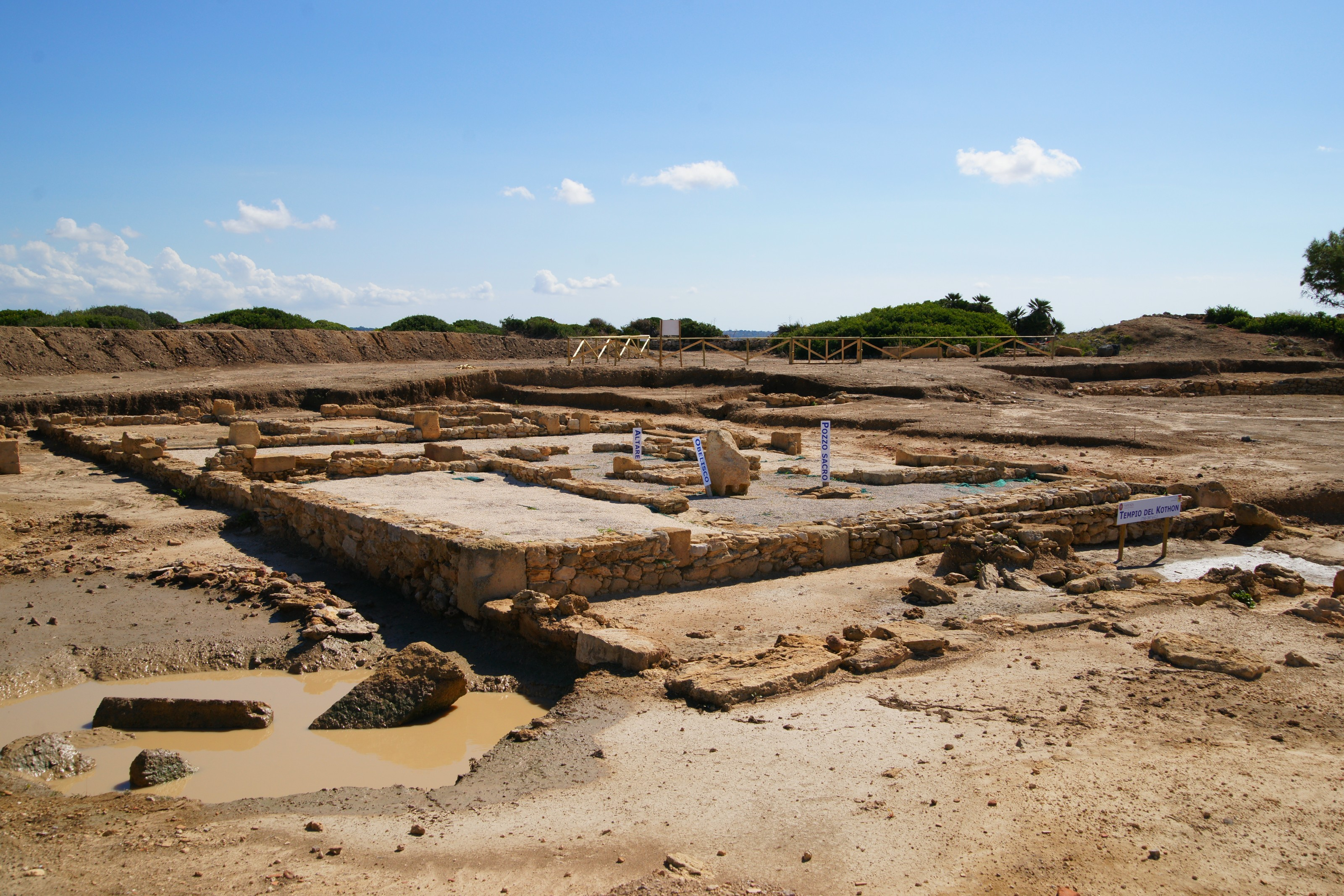
The Phoenician city on Motya

Beginning in the late 8th century BC, Phoenicians begin to settle in western Sicily, having already started colonies on the nearby parts of North Africa. The ancient historian Thucydides (5th century BC) mentions three settlements at Soloeis (Solunto), present day Palermo and Motya (an island near present-day Marsala), He also explains that the Phoenicians originally occupied various coastal locations throughout Sicily before concentrating in the western part of the island following Greek colonisation.

The Phoenicians integrated with the local Elymian population as shown in archaeology as a distinctive “West Phoenician cultural identity”. The Phoenicians did not carry out colonization in the traditional sense of the term; rather, they focused on controlling trade routes along the coasts. They did not promote urban development in the manner of the Greeks, who built large cities equipped with temples and theaters. It is interesting to note that, in the three Phoenician cities in Sicily, half the population was Greek. Western Sicily was, in essence, a Hellenized Elymian territory, with a minority of Phoenician merchants who facilitated the export of Greek pottery, olive oil, and Sicilian grain to North Africa. The Greeks also gave Greek names to the Phoenician cities in Sicily, such as Panormos (Palermo)—meaning "all-port" in Greek—or Lilybaion (Marsala), which in Greek signifies "the coast facing Africa" (the name "Libya" itself is also of Greek origin).

As Phoenician Carthage later grew in power, these settlements sometimes came into conflict with them, as at Motya, and eventually came under Carthage's direct control.

== Classical Age ==
=== Greek period ===
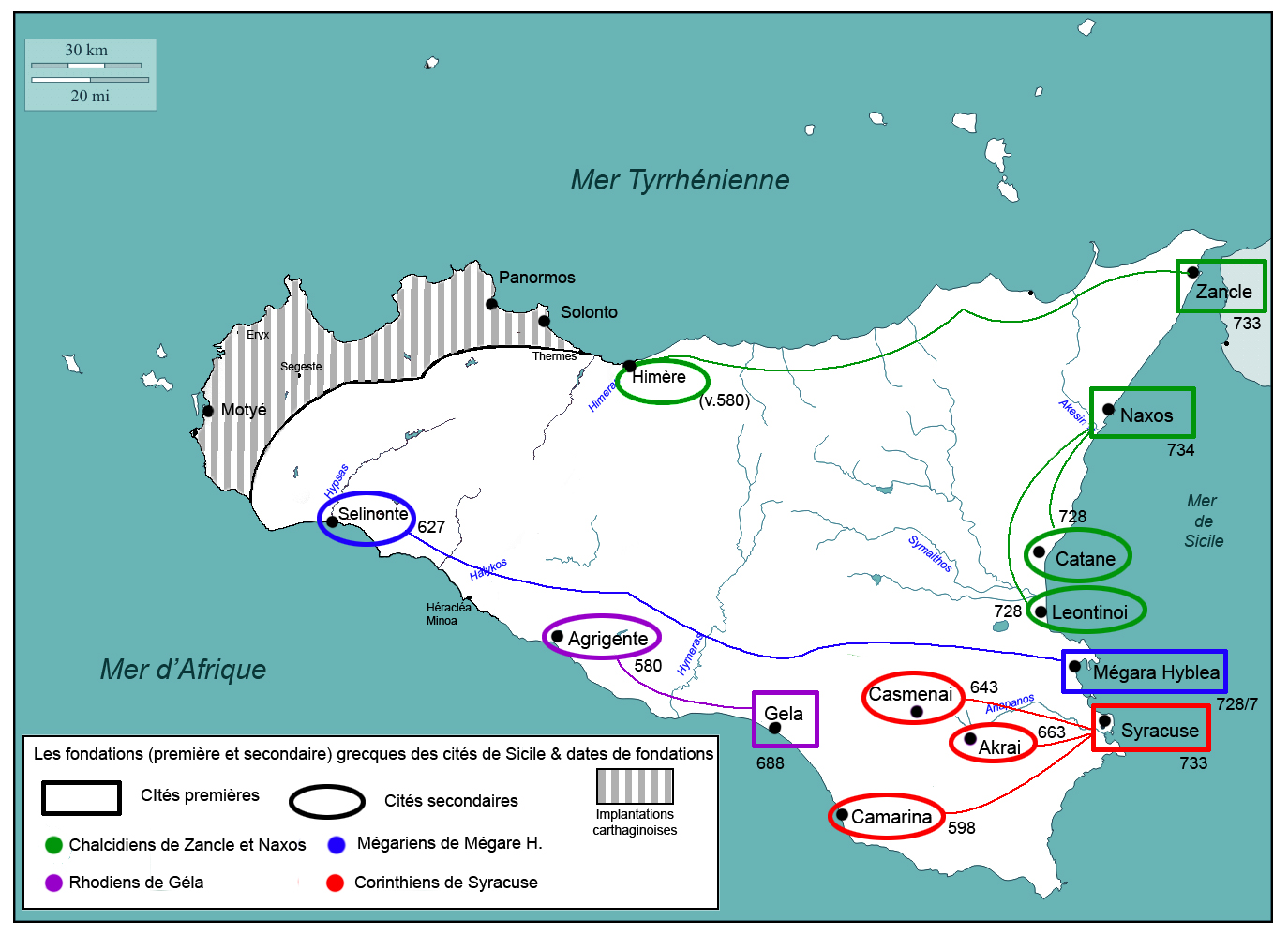
First Greek settlements & dates

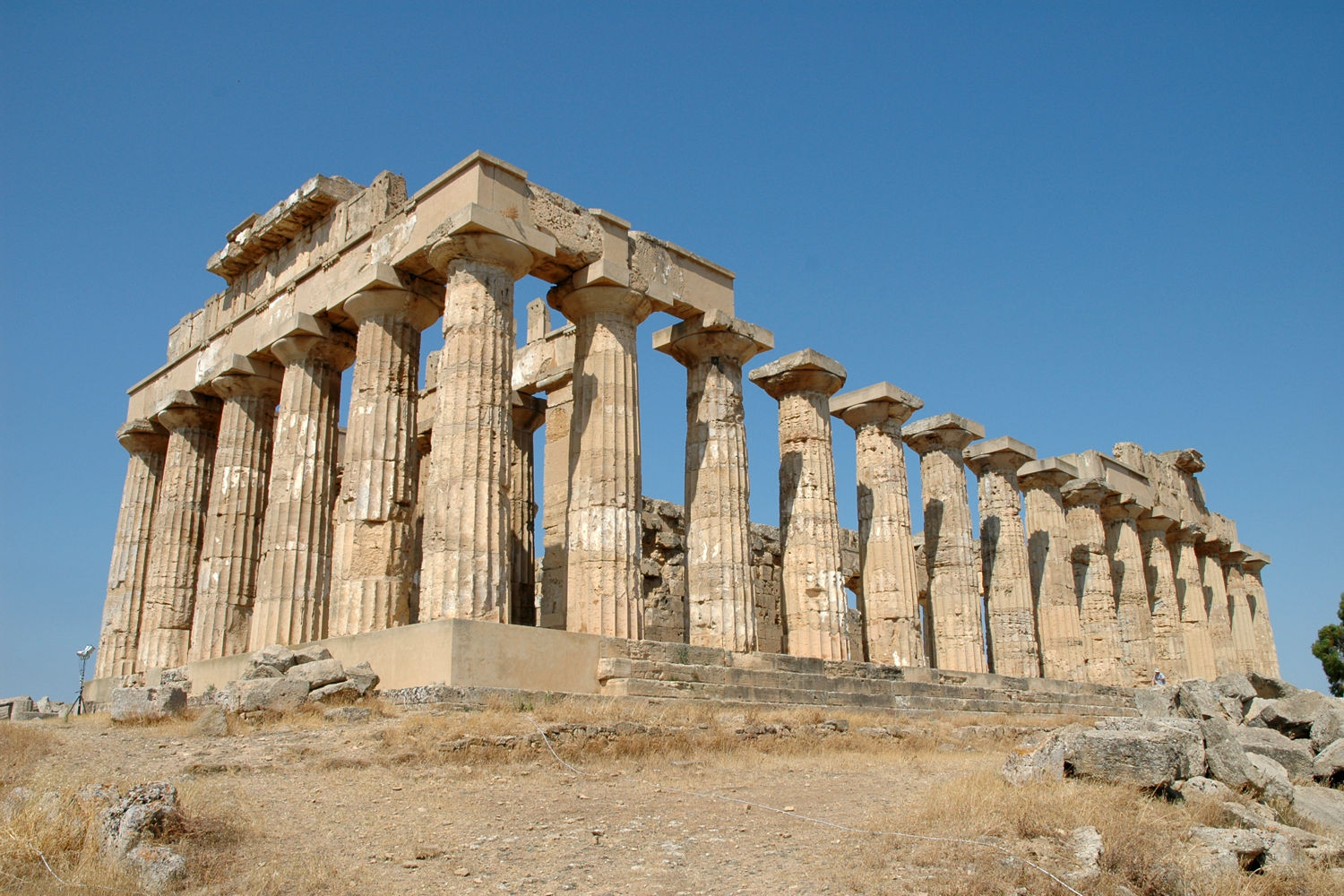
Greek temple at Selinunte. (Temple dedicated to Hera, built in the 5th century BC.)

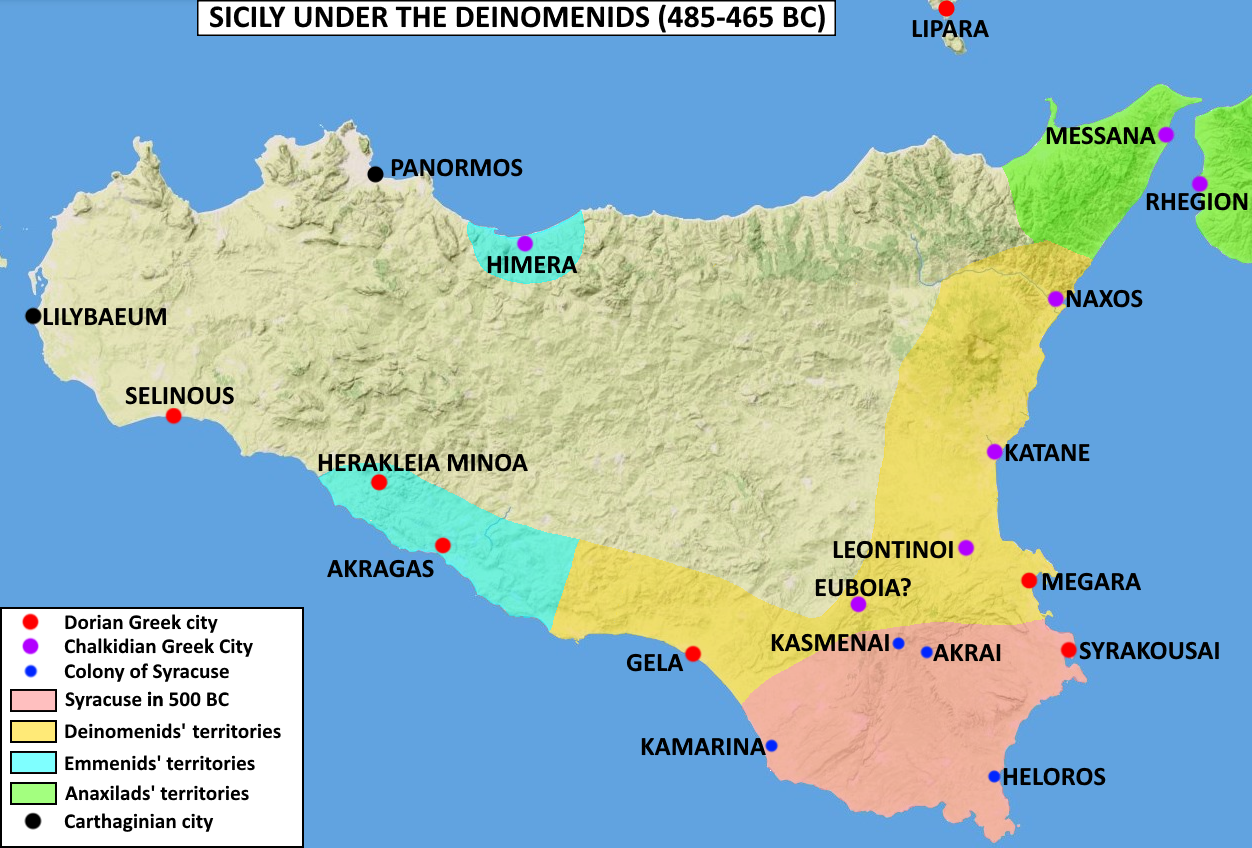
Rule under the Deinomenids (485-465 BC)

Sicily began to be colonised by Greeks in the 8th century BC. Initially, this was restricted to the eastern and southern parts of the island. The most important colony was established at Syracuse in 734 BC. Other important Greek colonies were Naxos, Gela, Akragas, Selinunte, Himera, Kamarina and Zancle or Messene (modern-day Messina). These city-states became an important part of classical Greek civilisation; both Empedocles and Archimedes were from Sicily.

As the Greek and Phoenician communities grew more populous and more powerful, the Sicels and Sicanians were pushed further into the centre of the island. The Greeks came into conflict with the Punic trading communities, by now effectively protectorates of Carthage, with its capital on the African mainland nearby. The dividing line between the Carthaginian west and the Greek east moved backwards and forwards frequently in the ensuing centuries.

The Greek city-states enjoyed long periods of democratic government, but in times of social stress, in particular during wars against Carthage, tyrants occasionally usurped the leadership such as: Gelo, Hiero I, Dionysius the Elder and Dionysius the Younger.

Sicilian politics was intertwined with politics in Greece itself, leading Athens, for example, to mount the disastrous Sicilian Expedition in 415 BC during the Peloponnesian War.

Pyrrhus of Epirus replied to Sicilian Greek cities' appeal for assistance, landing at Taormina in 278 BC, welcomed by the tyrant Tyndarion. His large army and 200 ships succeeded in neutralising both the Carthaginian and Mamertine threats, but he was unable to take the Carthaginian stronghold at Lilybaeum and returned to Greece.

By the 3rd century BC, Syracuse was the most populous Greek city in the world.

=== Punic Wars ===
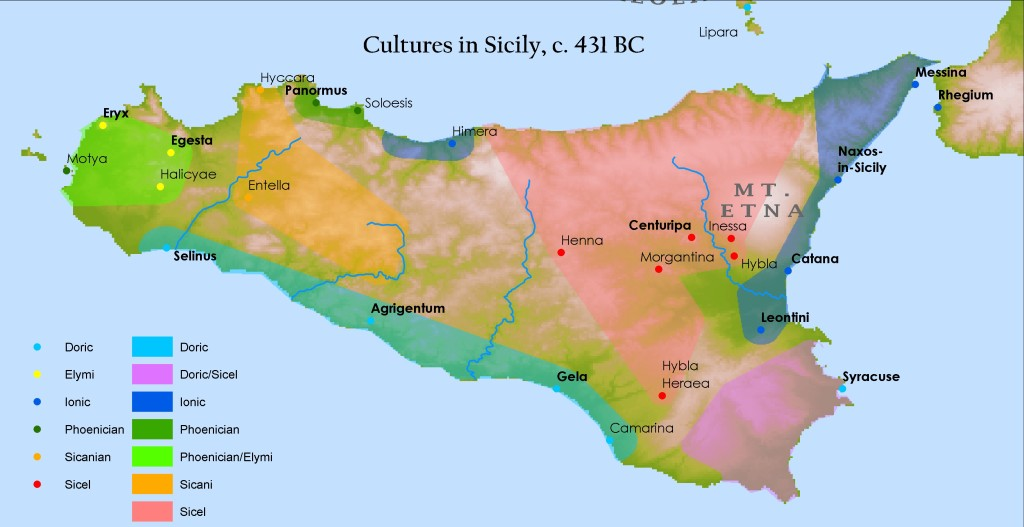
Sicily cultures 431 BC

The constant warfare between Carthage and the Greek city-states eventually opened the door to an emerging third power. In the 3rd century BC, the Messanan Crisis motivated the intervention of the Roman Republic into Sicilian affairs, and led to the First Punic War between Rome and Carthage. The Carthaginians sent forces to Hiero II, the military leader of the Greek city-states. The Romans fought for the Mamertines of Messina, and Rome and Carthage declared war on each other for the control of Sicily. This led to a war based mainly on the water, which served as an advantage to the Carthaginians, as they were led by Hamilcar, a general who earned his surname Barca (meaning lightning) due to his fast attacks on Roman supply lines. Romans attempted to hide the weakness in their navy by using large moveable planks to invade enemy ships and forcing hand-to-hand combat, but they still struggled due to the lack of a talented general. Hamilcar and his mercenaries struggled to receive additional aid and reinforcements, as the Carthaginian government hoarded their wealth due to greed and belief that Hamilcar could win on his own. His victory at Drepana in 249 BC was his last, as he was forced to withdraw. In 241 BC, after the Romans adapted better to battle at sea, the Carthaginians surrendered. By the end of the war in (242 BC), and with the death of Hiero II, all of Sicily except Syracuse was in Roman hands, becoming Rome's first province outside of the Italian peninsula.

=== Roman Period ===
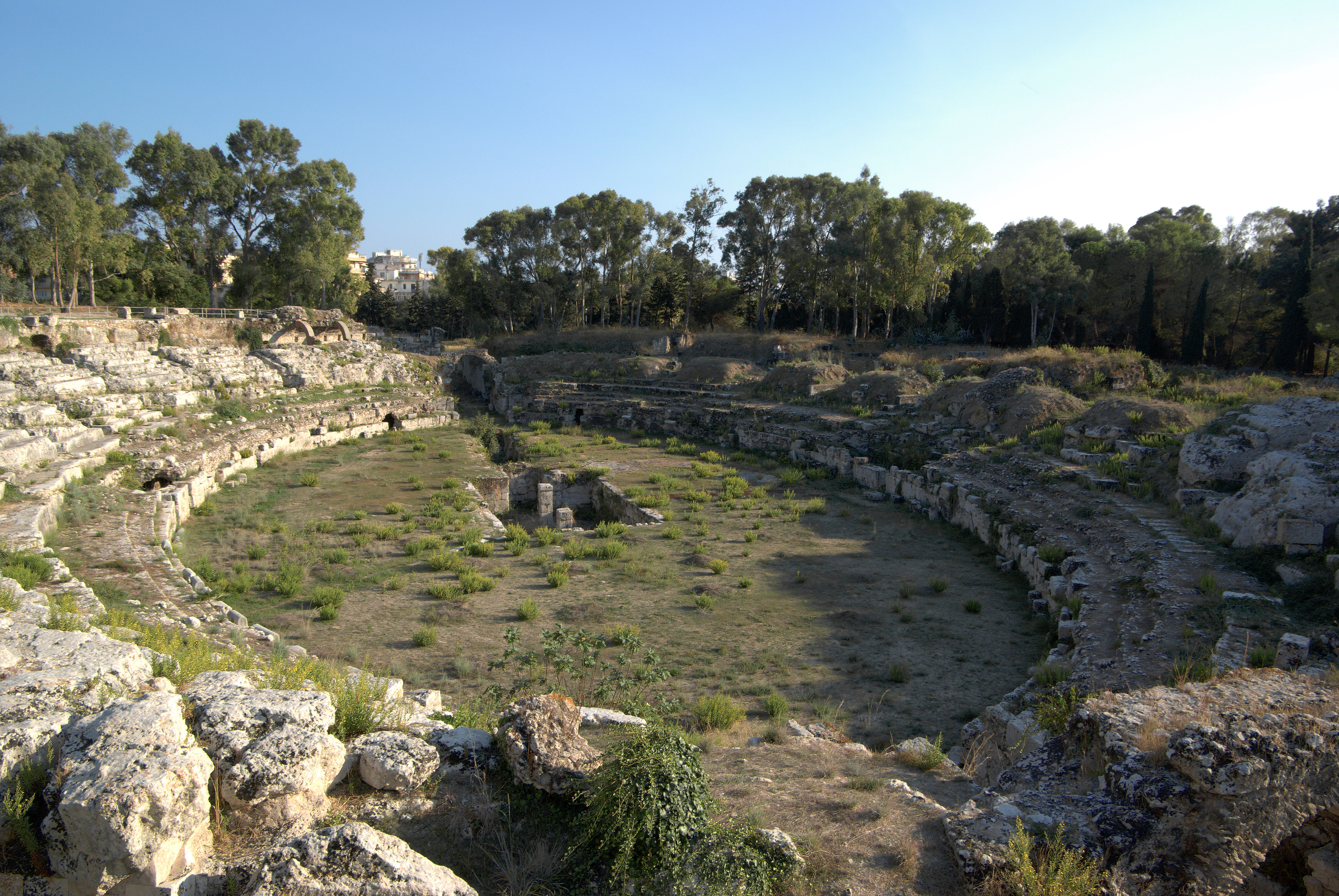
The Roman amphitheatre of Syracuse.

The success of the Carthaginians in Italy during the Second Punic War encouraged many of the Sicilian cities to revolt against Roman rule in 215 BC. Rome sent troops to put down the rebellions in 213 BC (during the siege of Syracuse Archimedes was killed). Carthage briefly took control of parts of Sicily, but in the end was driven off. Many Carthaginian sympathisers were killed and in 210 BC the Roman consul M. Valerius told the Roman Senate that "no Carthaginian remains in Sicily".

For the next 600 years, Sicily was a province of the Roman Republic and later Empire. It was something of a rural backwater, important chiefly for its grain fields, which were a mainstay of the food supply for the city of Rome until the annexation of Egypt after the Battle of Actium largely did away with that role. The empire made little effort to Romanize the region, which remained largely Greek. One notable event of this period was the notorious misgovernment of Verres, as recorded by Cicero in 70 BC in his oration, In Verrem. Another was the Sicilian revolt under Sextus Pompeius, which liberated the island from Roman rule for a brief period.

A lasting legacy of the Roman occupation, in economic and agricultural terms, was the establishment of the large landed estates, often owned by distant Roman nobles (the latifundia).

Despite its largely neglected status, Sicily was able to make a contribution to Roman culture through the historian Diodorus Siculus and the poet Calpurnius Siculus. The most famous archeological remains of this period are the mosaics of a nobleman's villa in present-day Piazza Armerina. An inscription from Hadrian's reign lauds the emperor as "The Restorer of Sicily", although it is not known what he did to earn this accolade.

It was also during this period that we find one of the first Christian communities in Sicily. Amongst the earliest Christian martyrs were the Sicilians Saint Agatha of Catania and Saint Lucy of Syracuse.

== Early Middle Ages ==
=== Germanic and Byzantine period ===
In 440 AD the Vandals under their king Genseric took Sicily after crossing over from Africa.

The Vandal attempt of 440 failed but another in 469 succeeded and they ruled the whole island for 7 years.

In 476 Odoacer gained most of Sicily for the payment of tribute to the Vandals.

In 491 Theodoric gained control over the entire island after repulsing a Vandal invasion and seizing their remaining outpost Lilybaeum on the western tip of the island.

In the Gothic War Sicily was the first part of Italy to be taken under general Belisarius who was commissioned by Eastern Emperor Justinian I. Sicily was used as a base for the Byzantines to conquer the rest of Italy, with Naples, Rome, Milan and the Ostrogoth capital Ravenna falling within five years. However, a new Ostrogoth king, Totila, drove down the Italian peninsula, plundering and conquering Sicily in 550. Totila, in turn, was defeated and killed in the Battle of Taginae by the Byzantine general Narses in 552.

When Ravenna fell to the Lombards in the middle of the 8th century, Syracuse became Byzantium's main western outpost. Latin was gradually supplanted by Greek as the national language and the Greek rites of the Eastern Church were adopted.

The Byzantine Emperor Constans II decided to move from the capital Constantinople to Syracuse in Sicily in 663, the following year he launched an assault from Sicily against the Lombard Duchy of Benevento, which then occupied most of Southern Italy. The rumours that the capital of the empire was to be moved to Syracuse, along with small raids probably cost Constans his life as he was assassinated in 668. His son Constantine IV succeeded him, a brief usurpation in Sicily by Mizizios being quickly suppressed by the new emperor.

From the late 7th century, Sicily joined with Calabria to form the Byzantine Theme of Sicily.

=== Muslim period ===
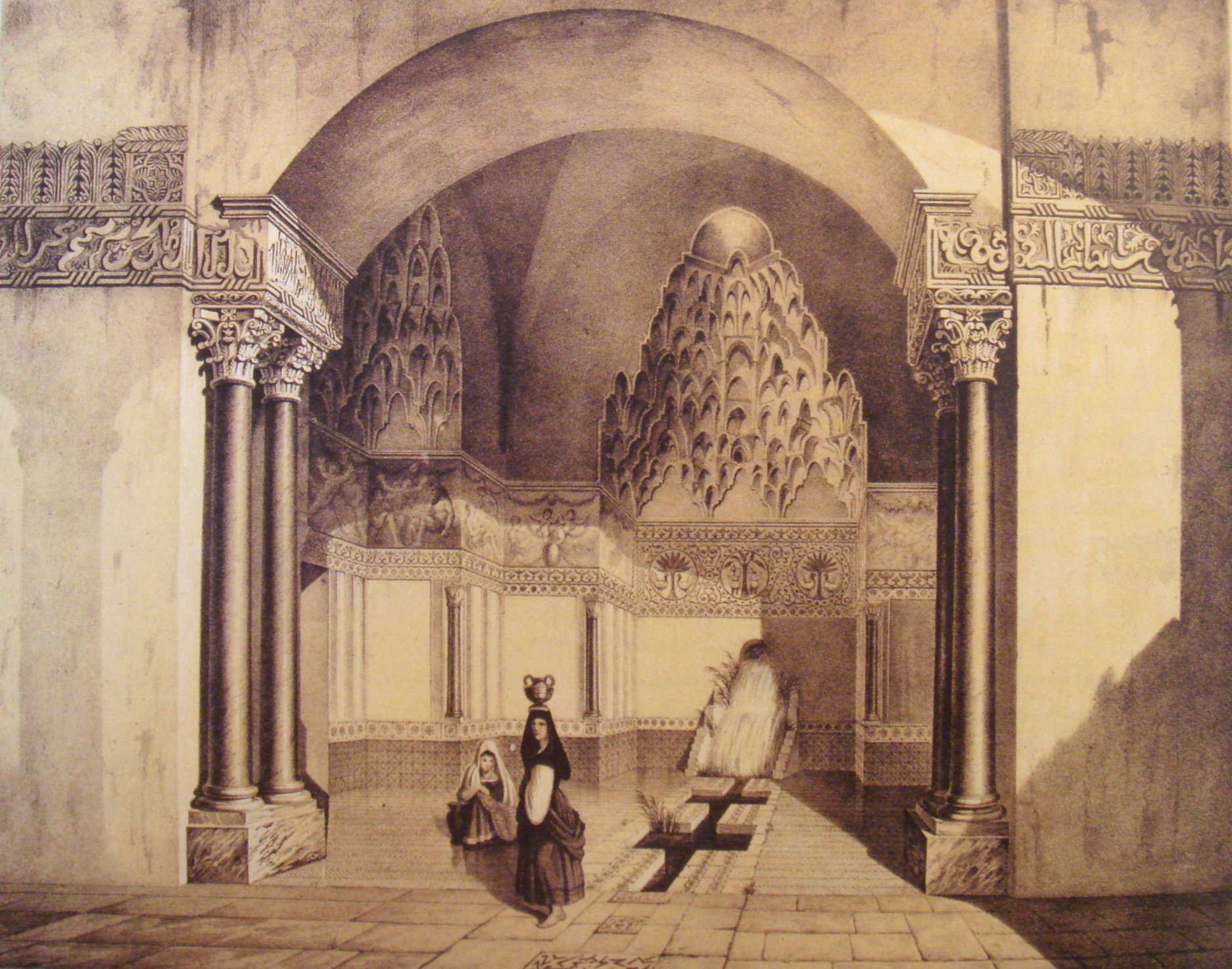
Norman–Arab–Byzantine art and architecture combined Occidental features (such as the Classical pillars and friezes) with typical Arabic decorations and calligraphy, following the Norman conquest of the former Emirate of Sicily and North Africa.

In 826, Euphemius, the commander of the Byzantine fleet of Sicily, forced a nun to marry him. Emperor Michael II caught wind of the matter and ordered that general Constantine end the marriage and cut off Euphemius' nose. Euphemius rose up, killed Constantine and then occupied Syracuse; he in turn was defeated and driven out to North Africa.

There, Euphemius requested the help of Ziyadat Allah, the Aghlabid Emir of Tunisia, in regaining the island; an Islamic army of Arabs, Berbers, Cretan Saracens and Persians was sent. The conquest was a see-saw affair; the local population resisted fiercely and the Arabs suffered considerable dissension and infighting among themselves. It took over a century to complete the conquest (although practically complete by 902, the last Byzantine strongholds held out until 965).

Throughout this reign, continued revolts by Byzantine Sicilians happened, especially in the east, and part of the lands were even re-occupied before being quashed. Agricultural items, such as oranges, lemons, pistachio and sugar cane, were brought to Sicily, the native Christians were allowed nominal freedom of religion with jaziya (tax on non-Muslims, imposed by Muslim rulers) to their rulers for their protection (Non-Muslims are not conscripted). However, the Emirate of Sicily began to fragment as inner-dynasty related quarrels took place between the Muslim regime.

== High Middle Ages ==
=== Norman conquest ===
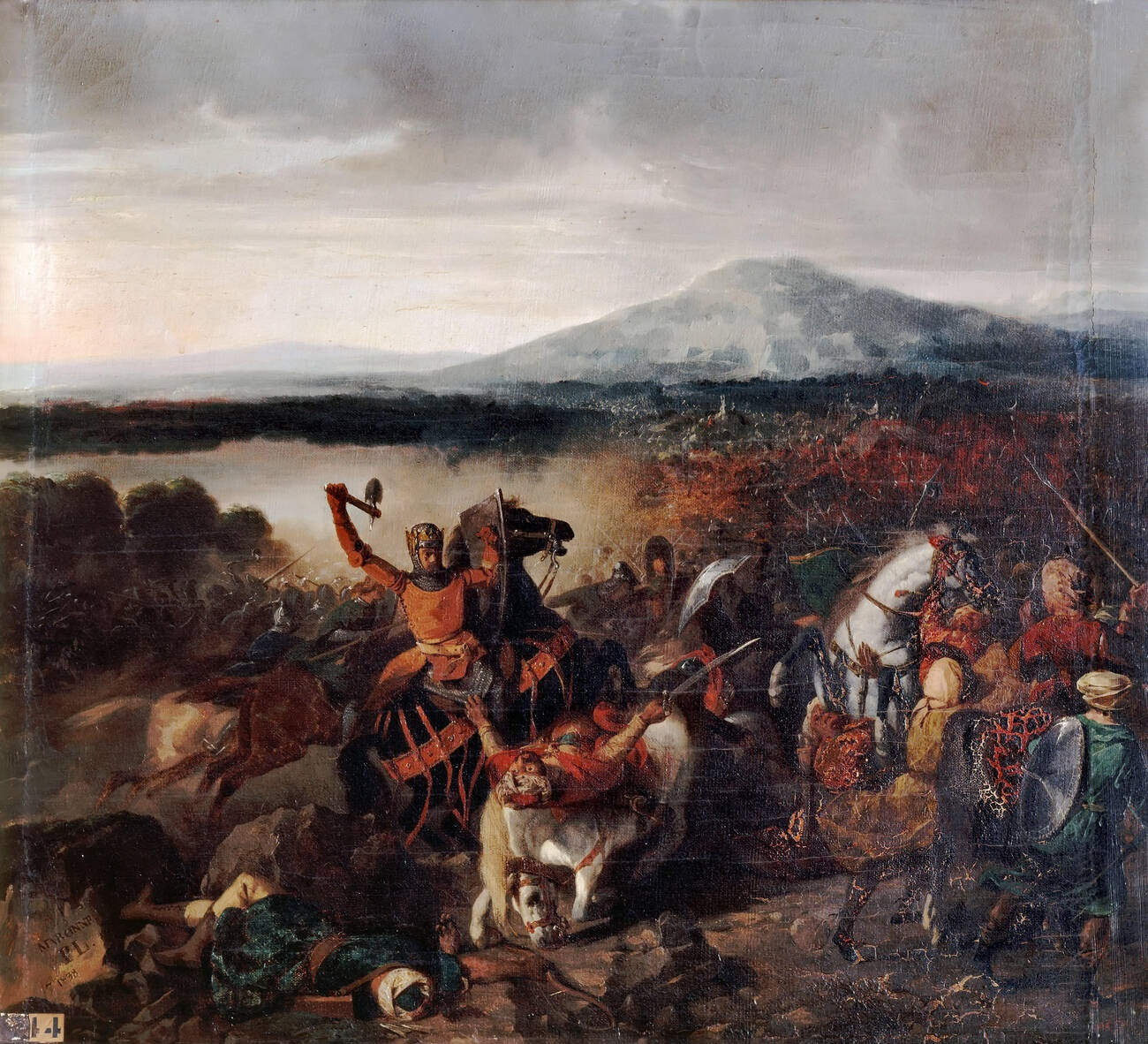
Roger I at the Battle of Cerami by Prosper Lafaye, circa 1860

In the 10th and 11th centuries, the mainland southern Italian powers were hiring Norman mercenaries, who were Christian descendants of the Vikings. Before them, other Norsemen visited the island: In 860, according to the account of the Norman monk Dudo of Saint-Quentin, a Viking fleet, under the joint command of Alstignus, believed to be Hastein, and Björn Ironside, initially raided Sicily before landing in Italy with the aim of sacking Rome. Other Norsemen fought as mercenaries in Southern Italy, including the Varangian Guard led by Harald Hardrada, who later became king of Norway, who occupied eastern Sicily between 1038 and 1040, with the help of Norman mercenaries, under the command of William de Hauteville, who earned the nickname Iron Arm by defeating the emir of Syracuse in a duel, and a Lombard contingent, led by Arduin. The Varangians were first employed as mercenaries in Italy against the Arabs in 936. In Sweden, Runestones were erected in memory of warriors who died in Langbarðaland (Land of the Lombards), the Old Norse name for southern Italy. It was the Normans, under the leadership of Roger I of Hauteville, who wrested Sicily from the Muslims over the course of thirty years, gaining control of the entire island by 1091 as the County of Sicily. Several Anglo-Danish and Norwegian nobles and kings joined the Norman conquest of southern Italy, such as Edgar the Ætheling, who left England in 1086, Jarl Erling Skakke, who earned his nickname ("Skakke," meaning "crooked head") after a battle against the Arabs in Sicily, and Sigurd I of Norway, who led the Norwegian Crusade to support the newly established Kingdom of Jerusalem, which had been founded after the First Crusade. On the other hand, many Anglo-Saxon rebels fleeing Norman Conquest of England joined the Byzantines in their struggle against Robert Guiscard, duke of Apulia, in Southern Italy.

Many historians have recently argued that the Norman conquest of Islamic Sicily (1060–91) was the start of the Crusades. The island's Muslims were faced with the choice of voluntary departure or subjection to Christian rule. The Muslims who could leave, apparently did so, seeking refuge in North Africa. The rest were forced to live under Christian overlordship, but they lived confined in an inner territory of western Sicily, in the area ranging from Palermo to Agrigento.

=== Norman period (1091–1194) ===
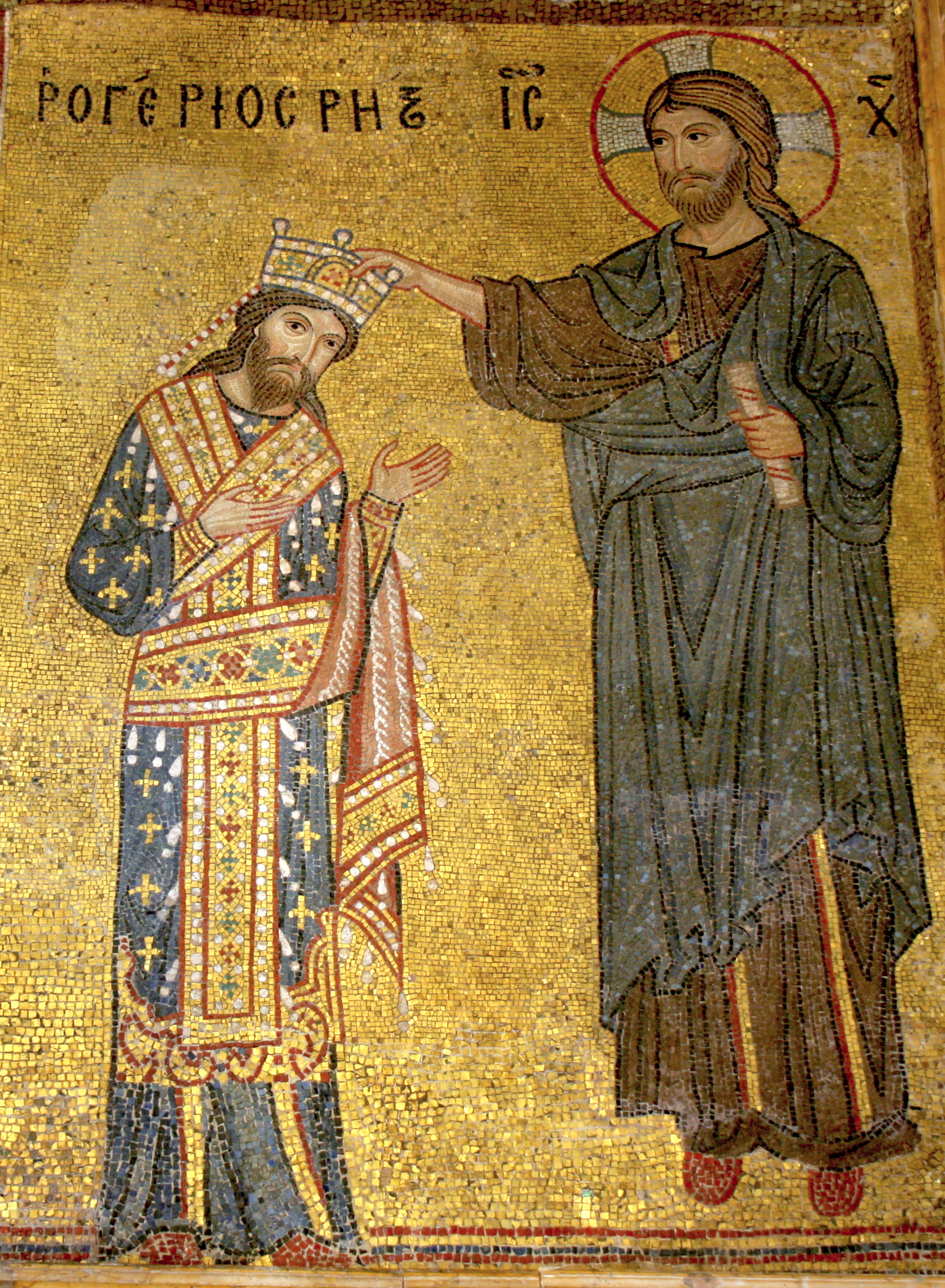
Detail of the mosaic with Roger II receiving the crown by Christ, Martorana, Palermo. The mosaic carries an inscription Rogerios Rex

The most significant changes that the Normans were to bring to Sicily were in the areas of religion, language and population. Almost from the moment that Roger I controlled much of the island, immigration was encouraged from Northern Europe, France, England, Northern Italy and Campania. For the most part, these consisted of Lombards of the Kingdom of Italy, who were Vulgar Latin variety-speaking and more inclined to support the Western church. With time, Sicily would become overwhelmingly Roman Catholic and a new vulgar Latin idiom would emerge that was distinct to the island.

Palermo continued on as the capital under the Hauteville. Roger's son, Roger II of Sicily, was ultimately able to raise the status of the island, along with his holds of Malta and Southern Italy to a kingdom in 1130. During this period, the Kingdom of Sicily was prosperous and politically powerful, becoming one of the wealthiest states in all of Europe; even wealthier than England.

The Siculo-Norman kings relied mostly on the local Sicilian population for the more important government and administrative positions. For the most part, initially Greek, Arabic and Latin were used as languages of administration while Norman was the language of the royal court. Significantly, immigrants from France, England, North Europe, Northern Italy and Campania arrived during this period and linguistically the island would eventually become Latinised, in terms of church it would become completely Roman Catholic, previously under the Byzantines it had been more Eastern Christian.

Roger II's grandson, William II (also known as William the Good) reigned from 1166 to 1189. His greatest legacy was the building of the Cathedral of Monreale, perhaps the best surviving example of Siculo-Norman architecture. In 1177, he married Joan of England (also known as Joanna). She was the daughter of Henry II of England and the sister of Richard the Lion Heart.

When William died in 1189 without an heir, this effectively signalled the end of the Hauteville succession. Some years earlier, Roger II's daughter, Constance of Sicily (William II's aunt) had been married off to Henry who was son of Emperor Frederick I and would later become Emperor Henry VI, meaning that the crown now legitimately transferred to him. Such an eventuality was unacceptable to the local barons, and they voted in Tancred of Sicily, an illegitimate grandson of Roger II. During his reign Tancred was able to put down rebellions, defeat an invasion by Henry VI and capture Empress Constance, but Pope Celestine III forced him to release her.

=== Hohenstaufen reign (1194–1266) ===
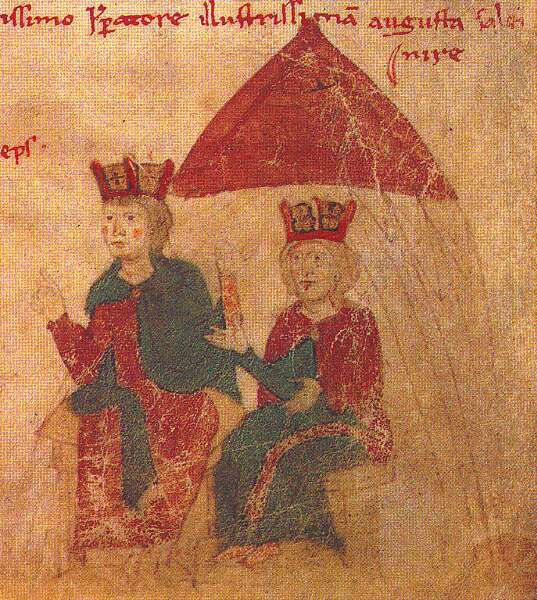
Henry VI of Hohenstaufen and Constance of Sicily.

Tancred died in 1194, just as Henry VI and Constance were travelling down the Italian peninsula to claim their crown. Henry rode into Palermo at the head of a large army unopposed and thus ended the Siculo-Norman Hauteville dynasty, replaced by the south German (Swabian) Hohenstaufen. Just as Henry VI was being crowned as King of Sicily in Palermo, Constance gave birth to Frederick II (sometimes referred to as Frederick I of Sicily).

Frederick was raised in Palermo and, like his grandfather Roger II, was passionate about science, learning and literature. He created one of the earliest universities in Europe (in Naples), wrote a book on falconry (De arte venandi cum avibus, one of the first handbooks based on scientific observation rather than medieval mythology). He instituted far-reaching law reform formally dividing church and state and applying the same justice to all classes of society, and was the patron of the Sicilian School of poetry, the first time an Italianate form of vulgar Latin was used for literary expression, creating the first standard that could be read and used throughout the peninsula.

Many repressive measures, passed by Frederick II, were introduced in order to please the Popes who could not tolerate Islam being practiced in the heart of Christendom, which resulted in a rebellion of Sicily's Muslims. This in turn triggered organized resistance and systematic reprisals and marked the final chapter of Islam in Sicily. The Muslim problem plagued Hohenstaufen rule in Sicily under Henry VI and his son Frederick II. The rebellion abated, but direct papal pressure induced Frederick to transfer all his Muslim subjects deep into the Italian hinterland, to Lucera. In 1224, Frederick II, Holy Roman Emperor and grandson of Roger II, expelled the few remaining Muslims from Sicily.

As a result of the Arab expulsion, many towns across Sicily were left depopulated. By the 12th century, Swabian kings and their successors granted immigrants from northern Italy (particularly Piedmont, Lombardy and Liguria), Latium and Tuscany in central Italy, and French regions of Normandy, Provence and Brittany (all collectively known as Lombards.) settlement into Sicily, re-establishing the Latin element into the island, a legacy which can be seen in the many Gallo-Italic dialects and towns found in the interior and western parts of Sicily, brought by these settlers. Other migrants arrived from southern Italy, as well as Normandy, southern France, England, Swabia and other parts of northern Europe. Additional Tuscan migrants settled in Sicily after the Florentine conquest of Pisa in 1406. Before them, other Lombards arrived in Sicily, with an expedition departed in 1038, led by the Byzantine commander George Maniakes, which for a very short time managed to snatch Messina and Syracuse from Arab rule. The Lombards who arrived with the Byzantines settled in Maniace, Randazzo and Troina, while a group of Genoese and other Lombards from Liguria settled in Caltagirone. After the marriage between the Norman Roger I of Sicily and Adelaide del Vasto, descendant of the Aleramici family, many Northern Italian colonisers (known collectively as Lombards) left their homeland, in the Aleramici's possessions in Piedmont and Liguria (then known as Lombardy), to settle on the island of Sicily. (Note: These Lombard colonisers were natives from Northern Italy and should not be confused with the Lombard Germanic tribe, who were referred to as Longobardi to distinguish them from the locals of the region who were known as Lombardi.) The new Roman Catholic monarchs gradually replaced Orthodox clergy with Latin clerics. This social process laid the groundwork for the introduction of Latin (as opposed to Byzantine) Catholicism. The process of Latinization was fostered largely by the Roman Church and its liturgy.

Frederick was succeeded firstly by his son, Conrad, and then by his illegitimate son, Manfred, who essentially usurped the crown (with the support of the local barons) while Conrad's son, Conradin was still quite young. A unique feature of all the Swabian kings of Sicily, perhaps inherited from their Siculo-Norman forefathers, was their preference in retaining a regiment of Saracen soldiers as their personal and most trusted regiments. Such a practice, amongst others, ensured an ongoing antagonism between the papacy and the Hohenstaufens. The Hohenstaufen rule ended with the death of Manfredi at the battle of Benevento (1266).

== Late Middle Ages ==
=== Angevins and the Sicilian Vespers ===
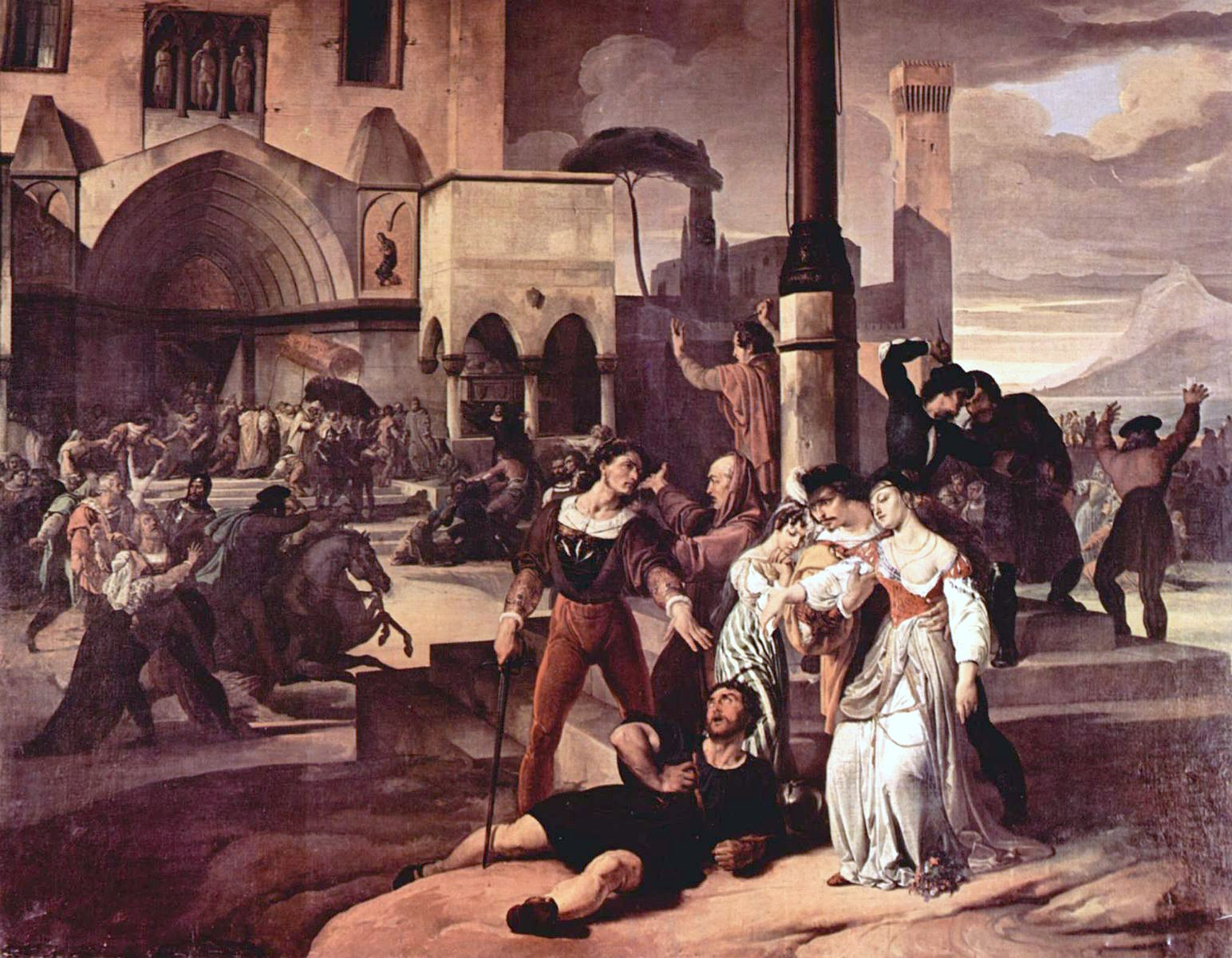
"Sicilian Vespers" (1846), by Francesco Hayez

Throughout Frederick's reign, there had been substantial antagonism between the Kingdom and the Papacy, which was part of the wider Guelph Ghibelline conflict. This antagonism was transferred to the Hohenstaufen house, and ultimately against Manfred.

In 1266, Charles I, duke of Anjou, with the support of the Church, led an army against the Kingdom. They fought at Benevento, just to the north of the Kingdom's border. Manfred was killed in battle and Charles was crowned King of Sicily by Pope Clement IV.

Growing opposition to French officialdom and high taxation led to an insurrection in 1282 (the Sicilian Vespers), which was successful with the support of Peter III of Aragón, who was crowned King of Sicily by the island's barons. Peter III had previously married Manfred's daughter, Constance, and it was for this reason that the Sicilian barons effectively invited him. This victory split the Kingdom in two, with Charles continuing to rule the mainland part (still known as the Kingdom of Sicily as well).

The ensuing War of the Sicilian Vespers lasted until the peace of Caltabellotta in 1302, although it was to continue on and off for a period of 90 years. With two kings both claiming to be the King of Sicily, the separate island kingdom became known as the Kingdom of Trinacria. It is this split that ultimately led to the creation of the Kingdom of the Two Sicilies some 500 years on.

=== Aragonese period ===
Peter III's son, Frederick III of Sicily (also known as Frederick II of Sicily) reigned from 1298 to 1337. For the whole of the 14th century, Sicily was essentially an independent kingdom, ruled by relatives of the kings of Aragon, but for all intents and purposes they were Sicilian kings. The Sicilian parliament, already in existence for a century, continued to function with wide powers and responsibilities.

During this period, a sense of a Sicilian people and nation emerged, that is to say, the population was no longer divided between Greek, Arab and Latin peoples. Catalan and Aragonese were the languages of the royal court, and Sicilian was the language of the parliament and the general citizenry. These circumstances continued until 1409 when because of failure of the Sicilian line of the Aragonese dynasty, the Sicilian throne became part of the Crown of Aragon.

The island's first university was founded at Catania in 1434. Antonello da Messina is Sicily's greatest artist from this period.

== Spanish period ==
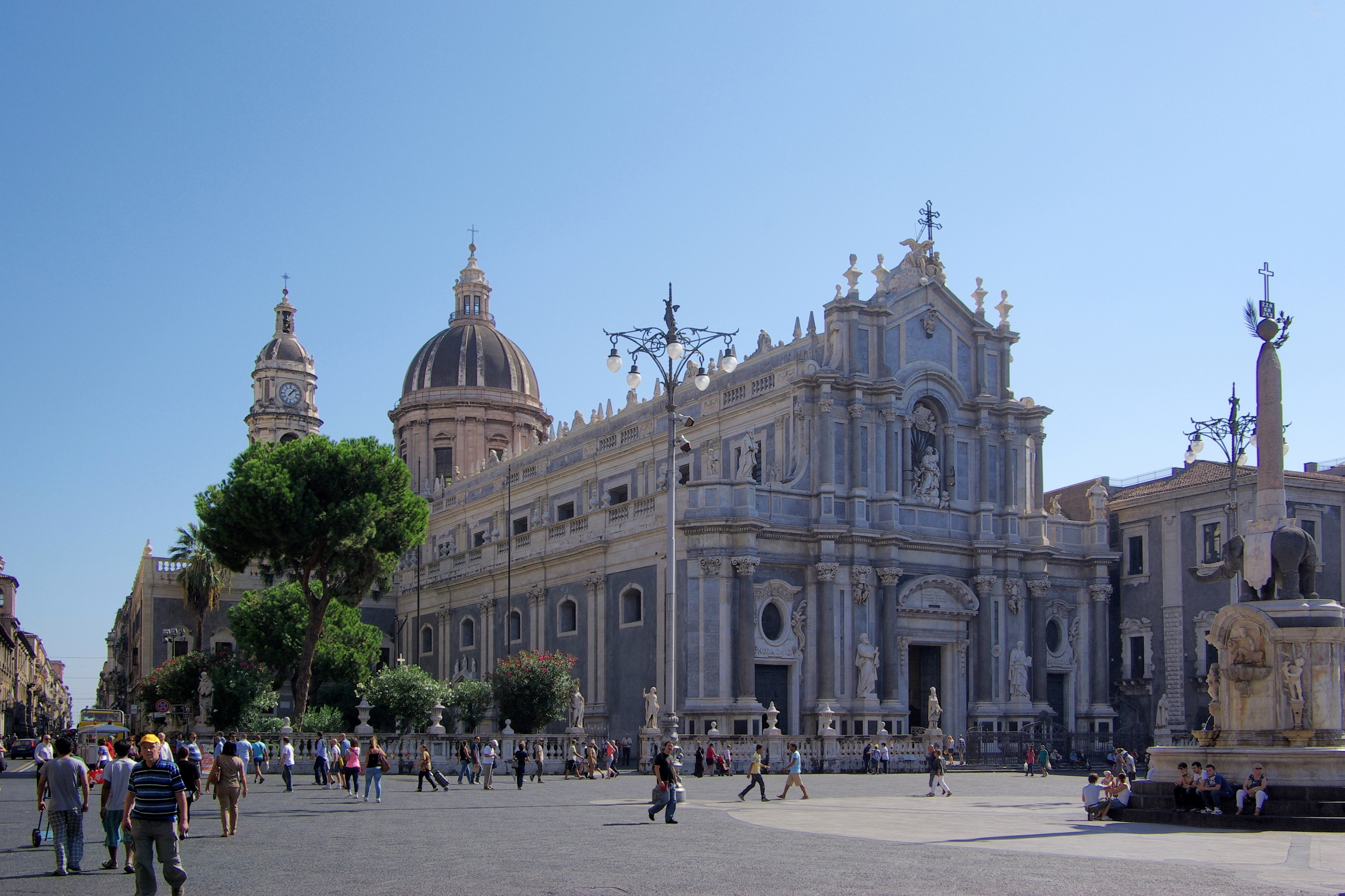
Catania duomo. Giovanni Battista Vaccarini's principal façade of 1736 shows Spanish architectural influences.

With the union of the crowns of Castile and Aragon in 1479, Sicily was ruled directly by the kings of Spain via governors and viceroys. In the ensuing centuries, authority on the island was to become concentrated among a small number of local barons.

The viceroy had to overcome the distance and poor communication with the royal court in Madrid. It proved almost impossible for the Spanish viceroys both to comply with the demands of the crown and to satisfy the aspirations of the Sicilians – a situation also apparent in Spain's Viceroyalties in Latin America. The viceroys secured territorial control and sought to guarantee the loyalty of vassals by distributing patronage in the form of offices and grants in the name of the king. The monarchy, however, also exercised its power through royal councils and independent entities, such as the agents of the Inquisition and visitadores or inspectors. Local spheres of royal influence were never clearly defined, and various local political entities within the viceregal system competed for power, often rendering Sicily ungovernable.

The 16th century was a golden age for Sicily's wheat exports. Inflation, rapid population growth, and international markets brought economic and social changes. In the 17th century, Sicily's silk exports overtook its wheat exports. Internal colonization and the foundation of new settlements by feudal aristocrats in Sicily was significant from 1590 to 1650, involving the redistribution of population away from the larger towns back to the countryside.

The baronage took advantage of increasing population and demand to build new estates, based mostly on wheat, and the new villages were inhabited mostly by landless laborers. The foundation of estates was a means toward social and political prominence for many families. The townspeople initially welcomed the process as a way of alleviating poverty by draining off surplus population, but at the same time it led to a decline in their political and administrative control of the countryside.

Sicily suffered a ferocious outbreak of the bubonic plague in 1656, followed by a damaging earthquake in the east of the island in 1693. Sicily was frequently attacked by Barbary pirates from North Africa. The subsequent rebuilding created the distinctive architectural style known as Sicilian Baroque. Periods of rule by the house of Savoy (1713–1720) and then the Austrian Habsburgs led to union (1735) with the Bourbon-ruled Kingdom of Sicily, under the rule of Don Carlos of Bourbon (later Charles III of Spain).

== Bourbon period ==
=== Sicily in the Napoleonic Wars ===
During the Napoleonic era, Sicily played a unique and strategic role in the context of the broader European conflicts. While much of the Italian Peninsula and Europe fell under Napoleonic control, particularly after Napoleon's forces invaded the Kingdom of Naples in 1806, the island of Sicily remained under Bourbon rule. King Ferdinand IV of Naples and his wife, Queen Maria Carolina, fled to Sicily with the help of the British Royal Navy, which ensured the island’s security from French invasion. Sicily thus became the last stronghold of the Bourbon monarchy in southern Italy. Under the protection and increasing influence of the British, especially through figures like Lord William Bentinck, significant political reforms were introduced. The British were committed to preserving the security of the Kingdom of Sicily so as to keep Mediterranean sea routes open against the French. The British dispatched several expeditions of troops between 1806 and 1815 and built strong fortifications around Messina. In 1812, Bentinck pushed the Sicilian nobility to adopt a liberal constitution modeled on the British system, which aimed to limit royal absolutism and promote parliamentary governance. Despite these progressive efforts, the reforms faced resistance and were short-lived; with Napoleon’s defeat and the Congress of Vienna in 1815, the Bourbons were restored to full power, and most of the constitutional changes were rolled back, reestablishing the old monarchical order.

=== Kingdom of the Two Sicilies ===
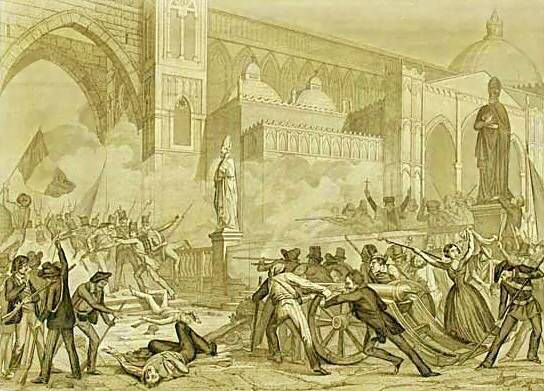
The revolution against the Bourbon in Palermo (12 January 1848).

The Kingdoms of Naples and Sicily were officially merged in 1816 by Ferdinand I to form the Kingdom of the Two Sicilies. The accession of Ferdinand II as king of the Two Sicilies in 1830 was hailed by Sicilians; they dreamed that autonomy would be returned to the island and the problems of poverty and maladministration of justice would be tackled by the count of Syracuse, the king's brother and lieutenant in Sicily.

The royal government in Naples saw the problem of Sicily as being purely administrative, a question of making existing institutions function properly. Neapolitan ministers had no interest in serious reforms. Ferdinand's failure, leading to disillusion and the revolt of 1837, was due mainly to his making no attempt to gain support in the Sicilian middle class, with which he could have faced the power of the baronage.

Simmering discontent with Bourbon rule and hopes of Sicilian independence led to major revolts in 1820 and 1848 against Bourbon denial of constitutional government. The 1848 revolution resulted in a sixteen-month period of independence from the Bourbons before its armed forces took back control of the island on 15 May 1849. The city of Messina long harbored proponents of independence throughout the 19th century, and its urban Risorgimento leaders arose out of a diverse milieu comprising artisans, workers, students, clerics, Masons, and sons of English, Irish, and other settlers.

The 1847-48 unrest enjoyed wide support in Messina and produced an organized structure, and consciousness of the need to link the struggle to the whole of Sicily. The insurgents briefly gained control of the city but, despite bitter resistance, the Bourbon army was victorious and suppressed the revolt. This suppression resulted in further oppression, created a diaspora of Messinian and Sicilian revolutionaries outside Sicily and locked Sicily under the control of the reactionary government. The bombardments of Messina and Palermo earned Ferdinand II the name "King Bomba".

== Modern era ==
=== Unification of Italy period ===
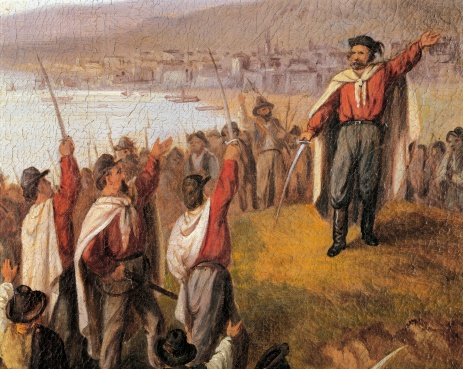
Expedition of Thousand: landing at Marsala

Sicily was merged with Kingdom of Sardinia in 1860 following the expedition of Giuseppe Garibaldi's Mille; after the Dictatorship of Garibaldi the annexation was ratified by a popular plebiscite. The Kingdom of Sardinia became in 1861 the Kingdom of Italy, in the context of the Italian Risorgimento.

However, local elites across the island systematically opposed and nullified efforts of the national government to modernize the traditional economy and political system. For example, they frustrated government efforts to set up new town councils, new police forces, and a liberal judicial system. Furthermore, repeated revolts showed a degree of unrest among the peasants.

In 1866, Palermo revolted against Italy. The city was bombed by the Italian navy, which disembarked on September 22 under the command of Raffaele Cadorna. Italian soldiers summarily executed the civilian insurgents, and once again took possession of the island.

A limited, but long guerrilla campaign against the unionists (1861–1871) took place throughout southern Italy, and in Sicily, inducing the Italian governments to a severe military response. These insurrections were unorganized, and were considered by the Government as operated by "brigands" ("Brigantaggio"). Ruled under martial law for several years, Sicily (and southern Italy) was the object of a harsh repression by the Italian army that summarily executed thousands of people, made tens of thousands prisoners, destroyed villages, and deported people.

==== Emigration ====
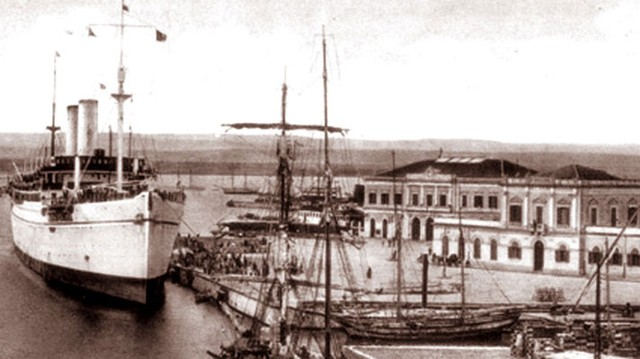
Emigrants departing from the port of Syracuse

The Sicilian economy did not adapt easily to unification, and in particular competition by Northern industry made attempts at industrialization in the South almost impossible. While the masses suffered by the introduction of new forms of taxation and, especially, by the new Kingdom's extensive military conscription, the Sicilian economy suffered, leading to an unprecedented wave of emigration.

The reluctance of Sicilian men to allow women to take paid work meant that women usually remained at home, their seclusion often increased due to the restrictions of mourning. Despite such restrictions, women carried out a variety of important roles in nourishing their families, selecting wives for their sons, and helping their husbands in the field.

In the years between 1889 and 1894, there were labour agitations, through the radical left-wing, called Fasci Siciliani (Sicilian Workers Leagues). The proprietors and landowners asked the government to intervene, and Prime Minister Francesco Crispi declared a state of emergency, dissolving the organizations. The suppression of the strikes also led to an increase in emigration.

==== Mafia ====
Ongoing government neglect in the late 19th century ultimately enabled the establishment of organized crime networks, commonly known as Cosa Nostra. The Mafia became an essential part of the social structure in the late 19th century because of the inability of the Italian state to impose its concept of law and its monopoly on violence in a peripheral region. The decline of feudal structures allowed a new middle class of violent peasant entrepreneurs to emerge who profited from the sale of baronial, Church, and common land and established a system of clientage over the peasantry. The government was forced to compromise with these "bourgeois mafiosi," who used violence to impose their law, manipulated the traditional feudal language, and acted as mediators between society and the state.

Map of the Allied landings in Sicily on 10 July 1943.

=== Early 20th century and Fascist period ===
The Sicilian mafia during fascism was fought by the government of Benito Mussolini, who sent the island in 1924 the prefect Cesare Mori. These were gradually able to extend their influence across all sectors over much of the island (and many of its operatives also emigrated to other countries, particularly the United States). After Mussolini came to power in the 1920s, he launched a fierce crackdown on organized crime, but they recovered quickly following the Allied invasion of Sicily in July 9-10 1943, during World War II, once the Allies freed the imprisoned Mafia leaders under the mistaken notion that they were political prisoners.

Although Sicily fell to the Allied armies with relatively little fighting, the German and Italian forces escaped to the mainland largely intact. Control of Sicily gave the Allies a base from which to advance northward through Italy. Furthermore, it proved a valuable training ground for large-scale amphibious operations–lessons that would be essential for the invasion of Normandy.

=== Post-war period ===
Following some political agitation of the Sicilian Independence Movement, Sicily became an autonomous region in 1946, with its own Statute, under the new Italian constitution, with its own parliament and elected president.

The latifundia (large feudal agricultural estates) were abolished by sweeping land reform mandating smaller farms in 1950–1962, funded from the Cassa per il Mezzogiorno, the Italian government's development Fund for the South (1950–1984). Cosa Nostra remained a secret criminal organization with a state-like structure until the 1970s. It utilized violence as an instrument of control and executed members who broke its rules as well as outsiders who threatened the organization or failed to cooperate with it. The 1960s Sicilian Mafia trials took place in response to a rise in organized crime violence around the late 1950s and early 1960s. In 1984, the Italian government initiated an anti-Mafia policy that sought to eliminate the organization by prosecuting its leaders. The early 1990s were the scenario of the dramatic death of Giovanni Falcone and Paolo Borsellino, anti-mafia magistrates, which triggered a general upheaval in Italian political life.

In the second decade of the 21st century, Sicily has become a destination for migrants coming from Africa and Middle Eastern countries, as well as Bangladesh, on their way to Europe, mainly Germany, Northern Italy, France and Sweden.

== See also ==
- List of Italian State Archives in Sicily
