= Judith d'Évreux =

Norman Noblewoman and Countess of Sicily

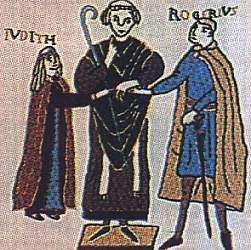
- Wedding of Judith and Roger
- Died: 1076; Sicily
- Noble family: House of Normandy
- Spouse: Roger I of Sicily
- Father: William d'Évreux
- Mother: Hawise de Giroie

Judith d'Évreux (died 1076) was a Norman noblewoman and Countess of Sicily.

Judith was the daughter of William d'Évreux and Hawise de Giroie, widow of Robert I de Grantmesnil. She was second cousin of William the Conqueror her father being the son of Robert II Archbishop of Rouen, while her mother was the daughter of Giroie, Lord of Échauffour, a wealthy Norman baron. (Note: Orderic stated that her mother had only one daughter by her second marriage to William d'Évreux while several sources claim she had a sister Emma. See The Ecclesiastical History of England and Normandy, trans. by Thomas Forester, Vol. I (London: Henry G. Bohn, 1853), p. 395; Schwennicke, Europäische Stammtafeln, II (1984), 79. While Norwich in The Normans in the South (1981) mentions a sister, he does not name her.)

Judith's half-brother Robert de Grandmesnil, abbot of the Norman Abbey of Saint-Evroul, was her guardian. After quarreling with Duke William in January 1061, Robert fled Normandy with Judith, her brother and sister, to Rome. Eventually he turned to Robert Guiscard, Duke of Calabria, who treated the abbot with great respect and invited him and his monks to settle in Calabria. The Duke's brother Roger I of Sicily had known Judith from Normandy, and his status and fortunes had now changed considerably. No longer the poor son of a lesser Norman family, when Count Roger heard that Judith was in Calabria he went to meet her. They were married immediately and he took his bride to Mileto where the marriage was celebrated.

Roger soon left Judith in Mileto and returned to his campaigns in Sicily. The following summer he joined Judith and brought her with him to Sicily where he and his army of three hundred went to Troina. Leaving Judith in the care of his garrison he continued his campaign. Greek residents then attacked his fortifications, attempting to take Countess Judith prisoner and ransom her in exchange for the Norman's leaving Troina. The garrison held out until Roger returned and rescued Judith and the troops guarding her. For four more months the Normans fought the Greeks who had now joined forces with the Arabs. Judith shared the hardships with her husband and the Norman troops living in the cold with little food. Finally Roger was able to overcome the Arabs and regain control of Troina. Roger needed to return to the mainland to replenish their horses and supplies and left Judith once again. This time Judith took command of the citadel herself until Roger returned.

Judith died, still a young woman, in Sicily in 1076.

Judith bore Roger a daughter, who married Hugh of Jarzé († 1076). Other children of Judith were:

- Matilda (1062–before 1094), who married firstly (repudiated before 1080) Robert, Count of Eu; married secondly (1080) Raymond IV, Count of Toulouse
- Adelisa, wife of Henry, Count of Monte Sant'Angelo
- Emma (c. 1063–aft. 1119), wife of Rudolf, Count of Montescaglioso

== Notes ==
Volume 1 of the Ecclesiastical History of England and Normandy by Orderic Vitalis states that Emma was Judith's aunt (mother's sister). In Judith's mother's generation, the daughters were Heremburge (1), Hawise (2), and Emma (3). Judith was Hawise's daughter. Judith had 3 brothers—Hugh (1), Robert (2), and Arnold (3)--and three half-sisters (unfortunately all unnamed), all from her mother's first marriage to Robert de Grandmesnil. In this section, Oderic makes no mention of any full siblings. However, later on after depicting the row between Judith's half-brother Robert and Duke William, Orderic mentions Judith having a sister, alternatively named Anna and Emma (p. 439, vol 1). However, it's unclear whether Emma was a Grantmesnil or d'Evreux. Source: Translation by Thomas Forester, 1853.
