= Battle of Misilmeri =

Battle in 1069 in Sicily

Date	1068
Location	Misilmeri
Result	Norman victory

Belligerents
Normans	Zirids

Commanders and leaders
Roger De Hauteville	Ayyub

Strength
Unknown	Unknown

Casualties and losses
Minimal	Majority of army

The Battle of Misilmeri was fought in 1068 just outside Palermo during the Norman conquest of Sicily. The battle was fought between a raiding Norman force and a Muslim army consisting of both Kalbid Sicilians and Zirid Africans. The battle resulted in an important Norman victory as it led to the abandonment of the Kalbids by their Zirid allies and opened the way for the Norman conquest of Palermo in 1072.

== Prelude ==
In the early part of the 11th century the Normans began to gain prominence within Europe, especially in Southern Italy where the many feuding states there hired them in large numbers as mercenaries. However soon the Normans, especially the Hauteville family, began to gain too much influence, taking territory for themselves and becoming the dominant power in the region. Following a failed papal attempt to expel them in the Battle of Civitate their dominance would become largely unchallenged. Meanwhile further south the Muslim Kalbid emirate of Sicily collapsed and split into multiple smaller states. By 1060 the Emir of Agrigento Ibn al-Hawas had conquered many of the other strongholds in Sicily and his rival the Emir of Syracuse Ibn al-Thumna fled to Roger De Hauteville, younger brother of the leading member of the Hauteville family Robert Guiscard, for help. The ambitious Roger saw this as an opportunity and was only too happy to offer his assistance. In 1061 Roger and Robert invaded Sicily and captured Messina. From here they would go on to take many towns and fortresses in the northeast of Sicily and defeated Ibn al-Hawas at a battle near Enna. However after this Robert went home to deal with rebellions and Ibn al-Timnah died, leaving Roger with only a small force and very little opportunity to further expand. In 1063 al-Hawas allied with the Zirid emirate of North Africa and their united armies forced Roger’s much smaller force into a battle. This was the famous Battle of Cerami, which resulted in a surprising and impressive Norman victory. The victory gave Roger free rein to raid wherever he wanted to in Sicily, and additionally caused discontent within the Zirid-Kalbid alliance which ended with the Zirid Prince Ayyub killing Ibn al-Hawas. However Roger still did not have the numbers to capture and garrison more towns or forts, with his attempt to take Palermo in 1064 failing. After this a lull in the major fighting occurs until 1068. By that point the Zirids had largely taken control of Muslim Sicily and felt confident enough to challenge the Normans in battle again.

== Battle ==
Thus when Roger was on one of his raiding expeditions he was met by a Muslim army only a few miles outside Palermo next to the town of Manzil-al-Emir (corrupted by the Christians into Misilmeri). The exact sizes of the two forces are unknown,however Roger’s forces were much more experienced. The battle was a rather simple affair, the heavy Norman knights charged and broke through the untrained Muslims, causing a rout. Apparently nearly the full Muslim army was slain. Probably the most famous thing about the Battle of Misilmeri is the anecdote about the Norman actions immediately after the battle. The Muslim army had brought along with them carrier pigeons and upon capturing them Roger ordered paper to be dipped in the blood of the Muslim dead and given to the carrier pigeons who flew back to Palermo. It was in this way that the citizens of Palermo learned of the defeat.

== Aftermath ==
Just like after Cerami, Roger was unable to do much with his victory, his force was still too small to capture further territory. However the victory at Misilmeri did prove significant for the Norman conquest of Sicily as it caused the Zirids to abandon the Muslim cause and return all their forces to Africa. This left the Muslims in Sicily confused and fractured and never again would they create a force large enough to confidently challenge the Norman knights. When Robert Guiscard returned with reinforcements to Sicily in 1072, finally allowing the conquest to continue, the Normans would only find Muslim resistance in the form of sieges, and never again on the open battlefield
