= Trifollaro =

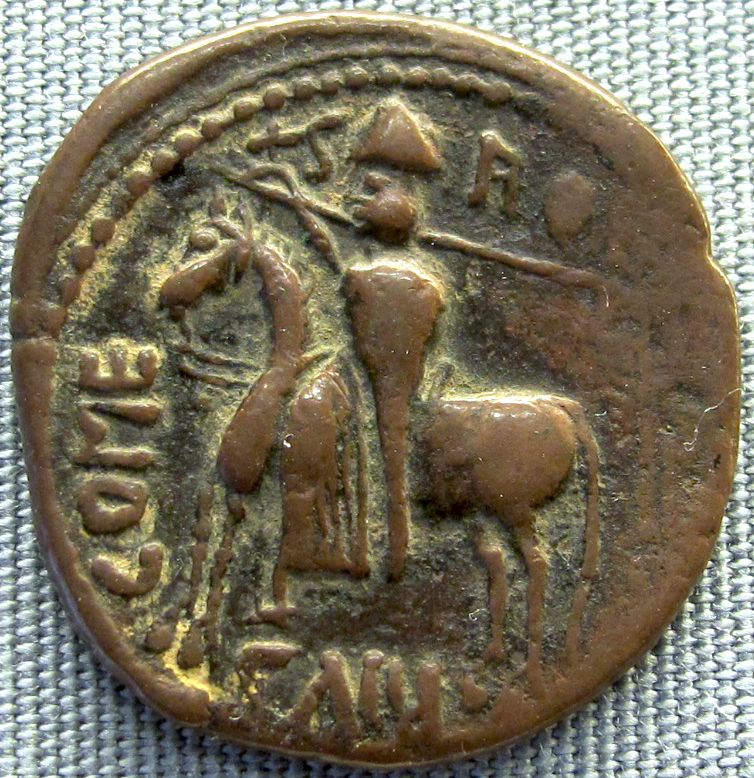
Trifollaro of Roger I

The trifollaro or trifollaris was a copper coin minted in southern Italy under the Normans. It was worth 120 nummi or 3 folles. The name trifollaro, used by scholars, was coined by the Italian numismatist Rodolfo Spahr. Contemporary sources do not use the name. Spahr interpreted the phrase tres follares aereos romesinam unam appretiatos ("three new copper follares should be taken as one romesina") in Falco of Benevento's discussion of the currency reform of 1140 as a reference to a new denomination of coin.

Count Roger I of Sicily (reigned 1071–1101) minted both folles and trifollari at Mileto. The latter are on average about three times as heavy as the former (10.6 to 3.4 grams). While the folles have a large Tau cross on them, the trifollari have an image of an armed equestrian figure. Philip Grierson argues that it is likely an image of the count made from life, since it has no identifiable model or parallel in contemporary art or sculpture. It is perhaps close in style to the contemporary Norman Bayeux Tapestry.

Duke William II of Apulia minted trifollari at Mileto. Those minted around the time of William's investiture by Pope Paschal II in 1114 bear an equestrian effigy in imitation of those of Roger I. Later examples have a variety of different images: busts, stars, crosses, etc.

In about 1184, King William II of Sicily began minting at Messina a trifollaro with a lion's face (or mask) on the obverse and a fruited date-palm on the reverse. This was a debased coin, much smaller than the trifollari minted a century earlier. The lion's face appears to be a copy of a Siculo-Punic coin minted at Messina in the fifth century BC—1500 years earlier. These may still have been in circulation in Messina in 1184. The date-palm may have been a symbol meant for William's Muslim subjects, since the Quran says Mary ate dates at the time of Jesus' birth.

== Sources ==
- Breckenridge, James D. (1976). "A Classical Quotation in Twelfth-Century Sicily". Gesta. 15 (1): 279–84. doi:10.2307/766777. JSTOR 766777. S2CID 193461587.
- Grierson, Philip; Blackburn, Mark A. S.; Travaini, Lucia (1998). Medieval European Coinage. Vol. 14: Italy (III) (South Italy, Sicily, Sardinia). Cambridge: Cambridge University Press.
- Travaini, Lucia (1991). "Aspects of the Sicilian Norman Copper Coinage in the Twelfth Century". The Numismatic Chronicle. 151: 59–74.
- "Trifollaro". Enciclopedia Italiana. Rome: Istituto dell'Enciclopedia Italiana. 1937.
