= Ibn al-Thumna =

Muhammad ibn Ibrahim ibn al-Thumna
- Born: Syracuse
- Died: March 5, 1062 Entella
- Commands: Qa'id of Syracuse and Castrogiovanni

Muhammad ibn Ibrahim, known as Ibn al-Thumna (Arabic: محمد بن إبراهيم، ﺍﺑﻦ ﺍﻟﺜمنـة, romanized: Muhammad ibn Ibrahim Ibn al-Thumna), was an Arab military leader of the 11th century.

== Biography ==
Probably a native of Syracuse, he was a member of the Arab-Sicilian nobility of the city. At the time of the disintegration of the Emirate of Sicily, he was the most powerful qāʾid (commander) on the island.

Around 1050, during the civil war between the various qāʾid of Sicily, he defeated and killed in battle Ibn al-Maklātī, the qāʾid of Catania. He later married Ibn al-Maklātī's widow, thereby usurping control of the city of Catania.

He came into conflict with his brother-in-law, Ibn al-Ḥawwās, lord of Castrogiovanni (modern-day Enna), a city he attempted to attack, but was defeated in battle by the forces commanded by Ibn al-Ḥawwās.

At the end of February 1061, he traveled to Mileto to meet Roger I, to whom he swore allegiance and promised his support to the Normans against the muslims in Sicily, giving one of his sons as a hostage.

The first Norman attempt failed, and Ibn al-Thumna had to retreat and barricade himself in Catania. However, a few months later, the Normans, led by Robert Guiscard, captured Messina and, combining their forces with those of Ibn al-Thumna, defeated Ibn al-Ḥawwās after besieging Castrogiovanni for a month.

The following year, in 1062, Ibn al-Thumna arrived near Entella with the Norman warriors, but fell into a trap set by a group of Sicilian-Arab townsmen, who lured him under the pretext of peace negotiations and, seeking revenge for his betrayal, assassinated him.

== Sources ==
- M. Amari - Storia dei Musulmani di Sicilia vol. 3, I edizione - Florence, Le Monnier, 1868.
- V. Di Giovanni - Cronache Siciliane dei secoli XIII. XIV. XV - Bologna, Romagnoli, 1865.
- L. Gatto - Sicilia medievale: eventi e personaggi di un'isola che ha rappresentato nei secoli dell'età di mezzo il crocevia tra Occidente, Oriente bizantino e mondo arabo - Rome, Newton Compton, 1992.
- L. Natoli, A. Rigoli - Storie e leggende di Sicilia vol. 1 - Palermo, Flaccovio, 1982.
- Entry «Ibn al-Thumna» (U. Rizzitano). in: The Encyclopaedia of Islam
