= Mauger, Count of Troina =

Mauger (born c. 1080) was the third eldest and probably eldest legitimate son of Roger I of Sicily. He was the son of his second wife, Eremburga of Mortain. His father made him count of Troina, but little else of him is known. He died after 1098, but when is uncertain and if he outlived his father he made no claim to the county of Sicily.

== Sources ==
- Houben, Hubert (translated by Graham A. Loud and Diane Milburn). Roger II of Sicily: Ruler between East and West. Cambridge University Press, 2002.
- Curtis, Edmund. Roger of Sicily and the Normans in Lower Italy 1016-1154. G.P. Putnam's Sons: London, 1912.
