= Eremburga of Mortain =

Countess of Sicily from 1077 to 1089

Eremburga of Mortain (Eremburge de Mortain) was the second wife of Count Roger I of Sicily and thus the second Sicilian countess. She is very obscure and details of her life are almost unknown to us today.

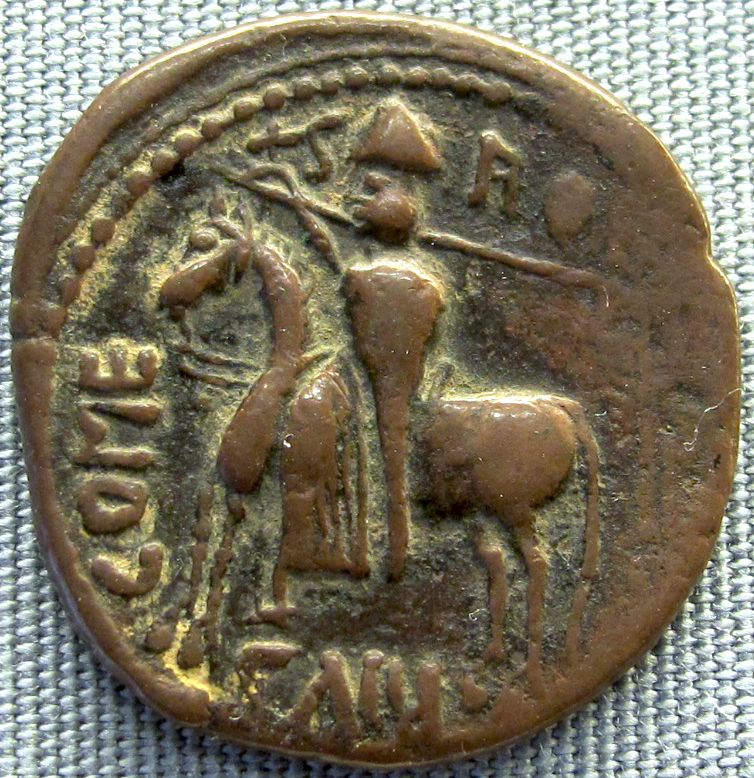
A coin of Eremburga's husband

Her father was either William, Count of Mortain or Robert d'Eu, and if he was Eremburga's father, then her mother was called Beatrix.

Roger married Eremburga in 1077 and she gave birth to several daughters and one son. Sources about her children give much contradictory information.

Eremburga's children were:

- Matilda, wife of Count Ranulf II of Alife and mother of Robert
- Flandina (Blandina), wife of Henry del Vasto, whose sister Adelaide del Vasto married Roger after Eremburga's death
- Constance (Matilda), wife of Conrad II of Italy
- Judith, who founded a Cluniac abbey at Sciacca
- Mauger, Count of Troina

Son of Flandina was Count Simon of Policastro.

It is possible that Felicia of Sicily, mother of Stephen II of Hungary, was Eremburga's daughter, and Geoffrey, Count of Ragusa was maybe Eremburga's son. Another possible Eremburga's child was Princess Muriel.

According to Goffredo Malaterra, Eremburga died in 1089.
