= Simon of Sicily =

Grand Count of Sicily from 1101 to 1105

Grand Count of Sicily
- Reign: 1101–1105
- Predecessor: Roger I of Sicily
- Successor: Roger II of Sicily
- Born: 1093; Palermo, County of Sicily
- Died: 1105 (aged 12); Mileto, Calabria
- House: Hauteville
- Father: Roger I of Sicily
- Mother: Adelaide del Vasto

Simon of Hauteville (1093 – 1105), called Simon de Hauteville in French and Simone D'Altavilla in Italian, was the eldest son and successor of Roger, Grand Count of Sicily, and Adelaide del Vasto, under whose regency he reigned.

The chronicler Alexander of Telese relates an incident that took place during the childhood of Simon and his brother, Roger:

As the way of children, they were playing a coin game which was a favorite of theirs, and fell to fighting. When they fought, each with a group of boys whom they had gathered together, the younger, Roger, was the conqueror. As a result, he mocked his brother Simon, saying, "It would be far better that I should have the honor of ruling triumphantly after our father's death than you. However, when I shall be able to do this I shall make you a bishop or even Pope in Rome - to which you're far better suited.

Simon was young when he ascended to the county in 1101 and he died only four years later in Mileto, Calabria in 1105. His death allowed his brother, Roger, who would be King of Sicily, to succeed him.

== Sources ==
- Takayama, Hiroshi (1 July 1993). The Administration of the Norman Kingdom of Sicily. The Medieval Mediterranean. Vol. 3. Leiden: E. J. Brill. ISBN 978-90-04-09865-7. ISSN 0928-5520. OCLC 28422212. OL 1416973M.

Preceded by Roger I	Count of Sicily; 1101–1105	Succeeded by Roger II
