= Battle of Cerami =

Main battle in the Norman conquest of Sicily

Coordinates: 37.78°N 14.50°E

- Part of the Norman conquest of southern Italy
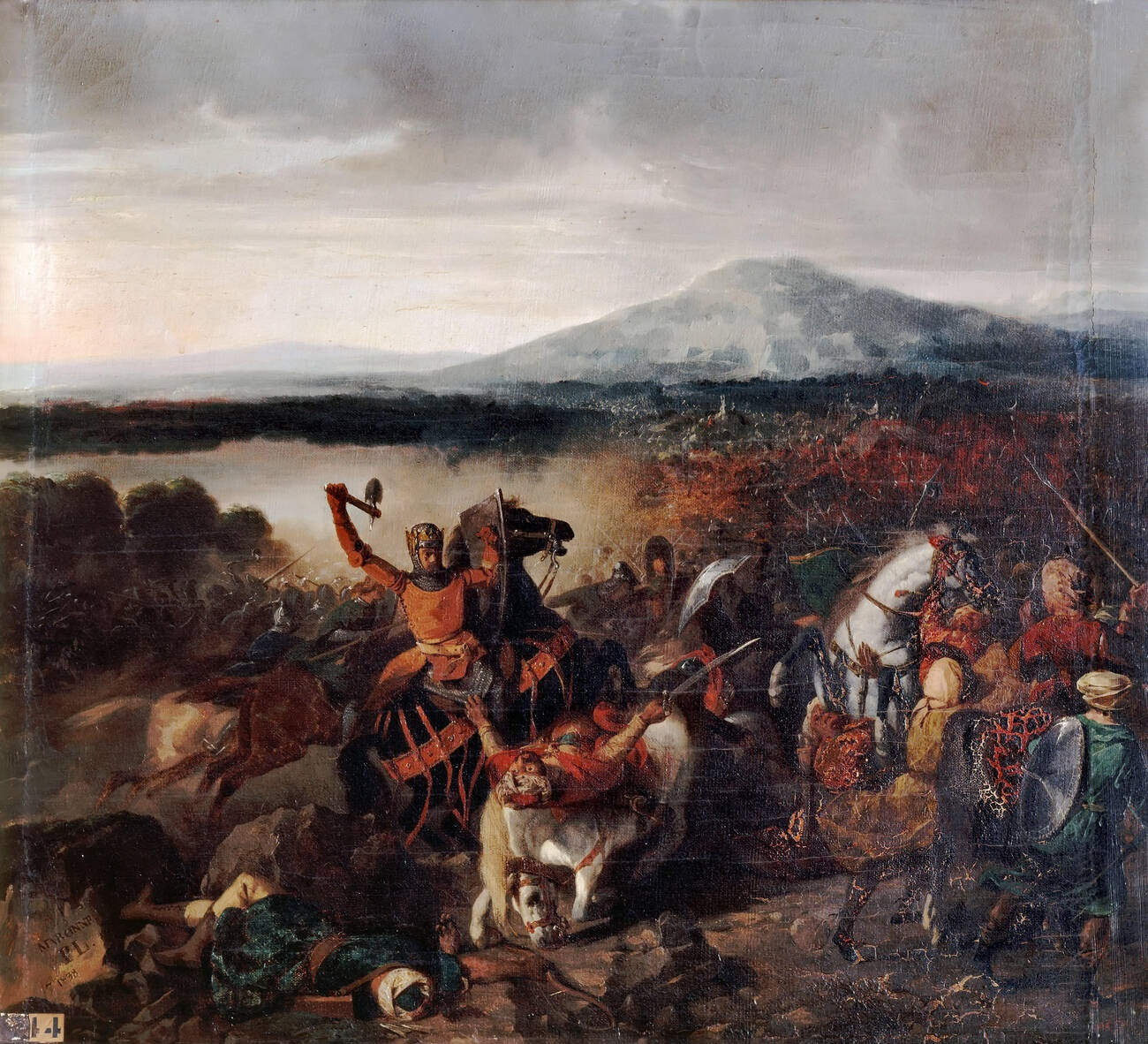
- Roger I of Sicily at the Battle of Cerami, by Prosper Lafaye
| Date | June 1063 |
| Location | Cerami (near Troina), Sicily |
| Result | Norman victory |

Belligerents
| Normans | Zirids; Kalbids |

Commanders and leaders
| Roger I of Sicily; Serlo II of Hauteville; Roussel de Bailleul; Arisgot du Pucheuil | Ibn al-Hawas; Prince Ayyub; Prince 'Ali |

Strength
| 136 mounted knights (Note: According to Robert S. Lopez, "A chronicler, repeating and embellishing what he may have heard from some imaginative veteran, states that St. George took part in the battle, and that one hundred and thirty-six Norman knights crushed 50,000 enemies...") "only slightly more" infantry | 3,000 horsemen 50,000 infantry (Christian sources, exaggeration according to Robert S. Lopez) (Note: According to Robert S. Lopez, "A chronicler, repeating and embellishing what he may have heard from some imaginative veteran, states that St. George took part in the battle, and that one hundred and thirty-six Norman knights crushed 50,000 enemies...") |

Casualties and losses
| Unknown | 15,000 |

The Battle of Cerami was fought in June 1063 and was one of the most significant battles in the Norman conquest of Sicily, 1060–1091. The battle was fought between a Norman expeditionary force and a Muslim alliance of Sicilian and Zirid troops. The Normans fought under the command of Roger de Hauteville, the youngest son of Tancred of Hauteville and brother of Robert Guiscard. The Muslim alliance consisted of the native Sicilian Muslims under the Kalbid ruling class of Palermo, led by Ibn al-Hawas, and Zirid reinforcements from North Africa led by the two princes, Ayyub and 'Ali. The battle was a resounding Norman victory that utterly routed the opposing force, causing divisions amongst the Muslim aristocracy which ultimately paved the way for the eventual capture of the Sicilian capital, Palermo, by the Normans and subsequently the rest of the island.

The initial battle took place at the hilltop town of Cerami, around five miles to the west of the Norman stronghold at Troina. However, the main battle was joined in the valley just to the south. The best-surviving source of information for the battle is found in Geoffrey of Malaterra's De rebus gestis Rogerii Calabriae et Siciliae comitis et Roberti Guiscardi Ducis fratris eius.

== Prelude ==
=== Norman invasion ===
Roger de Hauteville had arrived in Italy sometime after the Battle of Civitate in 1053, which had seen his brother Robert Guiscard catapulted into the spotlight. In the ensuing years, Robert inherited his brother Humphrey de Hauteville's lands and titles in southern Italy. As a result of increasing pressure exerted on the papacy by the Holy Roman Emperor, Henry IV, during the Investiture Contest, Pope Nicholas II was looking for allies. Despite the Norman victory against, and subsequent incarceration of, his predecessor Pope Leo IX in 1053 at Civitate, Nicholas concluded the Synod of Melfi in 1059 by formally acknowledging the Norman possessions in southern Italy and granting Robert the title of Duke of Apulia and Calabria, and in the future, of Sicily. Robert did not have to wait long for an opportunity to invade Sicily.

By this time, Roger had taken control of Calabria from Robert in recognition of Roger's help against the rebellious Norman lords there and held it as his fief, but owing homage to Robert as his duke. In 1060, the Sicilian Emir of Syracuse, Ibn al-Timnah, landed at Reggio in Calabria to secure the aid of the Normans against his rival emir, Ibn al-Hawas. He promised that, in return for the Normans' military assistance, al-Timnah would acknowledge their claim over the entire island. Roger immediately began preparing to make a foray across the straits of Messina. After one reconnaissance raid in 1060 and one abortive attempt in early 1061, Roger captured Messina ahead of a Norman army under the command of Robert Guiscard.

The population of the Val Demone region of Sicily, of which Messina forms the northeast corner, was largely made up of Greek-speaking Christians despite two centuries of Islamic rule and they welcomed the Normans as liberators. With Messina fortified and garrisoned, Robert and Roger were free to march inland. Conquering as they went, the Norman army quickly secured Rometta, Frazzano, Centuripe and Paternò. They defeated a sizeable force belonging to Ibn al-Hawas as his fortress at Enna (or Castrogiovanni) but were ill-prepared to maintain a siege of its citadel for long. With the campaigning season drawing to a close, Robert abandoned the siege and returned to Italy with Roger. Roger however, did not remain there long and, returning with a small force, captured Troina, where he spent Christmas 1061. The following year, while his brother was tied down with Apulian rebellions and Byzantine resurgences, Roger plundered to Agrigento and solidified Norman holdings in the Val Demone. However, as 1062 drew to a close, Ibn al-Hawas launched a counterattack which besieged Roger's wife and a handful of retainers in Troina's citadel. Roger returned from plundering and his relief force broke through the siege lines and managed to occupy the citadel, but the Normans found themselves besieged by the Muslims as well as the Greek townsfolk, who were tired of the harsh Norman rule. Roger's second Christmas in Troina was markedly less comfortable.

Early in 1063, Roger broke the siege of Troina and resumed his harrying of the Sicilian interior. Unbeknown to him, however, Ibn al-Hawas had signed an alliance with the Zirid emir of Ifriqiya, Tamim ibn al-Mu'izz, and had received substantial reinforcements of Zirid soldiers led by his sons, princes Ayyub and 'Ali. Ibn al-Hawas struck eastwards at the head of this army towards Roger's position at Troina with a single-minded ambition, to destroy the Norman presence on the island.

== Army composition ==
=== Normans ===
Roger's force consisted of 136 mounted Norman knights who were highly disciplined and well versed in the Frankish tactic of the heavy cavalry charge. The Norman force would also have contained an infantry element but, owing to Roger's chronic shortage of manpower, this almost certainly did not exceed approximately 150 troops and would have consisted of Norman as well as Calabrian Lombard sergeants and dismounted knights and squires.

Norman notables at the battle included Roger I of Sicily, Serlo II of Hauteville, Roussel de Bailleul and Arisgot du Pucheuil. Roger, although the supreme commander of the army, would also have led a personal retinue of several dozen knights and their entourages. His nephew Serlo also commanded a cadre of around 30 knights, as would have other lords, and to a lesser extent other knights, such as Roussel de Bailleul and Arisgot du Pucheuil.

=== Muslim alliance ===
We know relatively little about the composition of the Kalbid/Zirid army at Cerami. The majority of troops were of Berber origin and were under the command of the Zirid princes. Ibn al-Hawas commanded a sizeable force himself consisting of troops levied mainly from Palermo and Agrigento. The Zirid forces, being mostly Berber tribesmen, were many but lacked professionalism and discipline, unlike the Palermitans. This would later cause significant rifts between the two allies as increased Zirid control in Palermo and their successive defeats at the hands of Normans led to many Sicilians resenting their interference.

== Initial moves ==
=== Siege of Cerami ===
Upon discovering the proximity of the Muslim army, Roger immediately sent Serlo and his knights as an advance force to secure the strategically vital position offered by Cerami. When the Muslim vanguard drew up before the town, they found the gates shut and barred against them; Serlo's knights spread thinly across the walls. Ibn al-Hawas ordered the vanguard to scale the walls and take the town but all efforts were repulsed and met with failure. Some time afterward, probably around an hour (but sometimes stated to be as long as 3 days) later, and once the Muslim force had arrived in full, Roger's main force entered the valley from the East and drew up into battle order.

== Main action ==
Unfortunately, nothing is known about the disposition of the Muslim force at the battle. However, the vanguard was likely made up of the Muslim cavalry contingent which dismounted to besiege the town. Roger's force, however, was drawn up into a tight body of men forming a vanguard and a rearguard, in a similar fashion to the Norman tactic used at Castrogiovanni in 1061.

The Muslim force, tired of its fruitless efforts to capture Cerami, abandoned the siege of the town and drew up to face them. It is unclear who attacked first, but a hesitant Roger is recorded as having led an early cavalry charge that failed to break the Muslim lines. The Muslim forces then counterattacked in force; however, the Norman infantry held fast. It was at this point that St. George is said to have appeared amongst the Norman ranks, clad in shining white armor atop a white stallion and bearing the flag of St. George upon his lance (it has sometimes been portrayed as Roger who bore the flag of St. George). His speech inspired the Norman knights to charge the Muslim ranks again and, as they did, Serlo led a charge down from Cerami into the left flank of the Muslim force, cutting a bloody path towards his Norman compatriots.

In the space of a few hours, the courage and determination of the Norman warriors in the face of such an overwhelming force had checked the Muslim onslaught. The surprise of the double charge proved too much for the undisciplined Zirid troops, who turned tail and fled, precipitating the rout of the remaining Kalbid troops. Before long the entire Muslim army had descended into a chaotic flight which the Norman cavalry, now regrouped, was able to exploit without mercy.

== Aftermath ==
Malaterra records how the Norman cavalry chased the mass of routing troops back to their camp, which they sacked and pillaged, killing all they found. He also claims that the Norman cavalry wanted to stop and rest their horses at the Muslim camp and enjoy the spoils of war, but Roger ordered the chase to be continued into the surrounding mountains so that he could capitalize on the rout. After much time had passed, and the dust had settled, it is claimed that 35,000 Saracens and Zirids had been killed. Yet the Zirid Princes Ayyud and 'Ali, as well as the Palermitan Emir Ibn al-Hawas, escaped the battle, returning to Palermo with what remained of the Muslim army.

Roger, in the immediate aftermath, sent four camels as a gift to the Norman suzerain, the reigning Pope Alexander II, who in return blessed the expedition and offered certain spiritual indulgences, such as remission of sins, for those who had fought at the battle. With his possessions secured, Roger took advantage of the lull in Muslim aggression to return to Calabria to quell rising rebellious sentiments among his vassals and to plan the capture of Palermo with his brother, the Duke of Apulia and Calabria, Robert Guiscard.

== Consequences ==
The Normans were now the dominant force in Sicily. But that is not to say they were unchallenged. Their victory at Cerami had tipped the balance of power in their favor but they were still only in undisputed possession of the Val Demone region around Messina. The Val di Noto and Val di Mazara regions were still firmly in the hands of the Kalbids. However, the Norman victory had scattered Muslim hopes for a swift counter-offensive that might expel the Normans from the island. The Kalbid Palermitans began to resent the interference of the Zirid rulers in Sicilian affairs and blamed them for the defeat at Cerami. This hostility increased gradually until the second humiliating defeat of the alliance by the Normans at the Battle of Misilmeri in 1068, only 5 miles from Palermo. Riots broke out in Palermo and Ibn al-Hawas rose in revolt against the Zirid princes at Agrigento. Ibn al-Hawas was killed in the fighting but the Zirid prince Ayyub gathered what was left of his troops and returned to his North African domains. Having lost the last vestiges of a field army, the remaining Sicilian troops could only watch from the walls of Palermo, waiting for the inevitable killing-blow. It came 3 years later, in 1071, after Robert Guiscard had added Bari, the final Byzantine foothold in Apulia, to his domains. A much larger force of Normans, as many as 3000, attacked the city by both land and sea, led by Robert Guiscard and Roger. After a siege lasting five months, the Palermitans capitulated on January 10, 1072.

Although local resistance across the island lasted for a further 2 decades, this moment marked the turning point in the fortunes of the Normans. In gaining Palermo, the Normans were on their way to establishing what was arguably the most successful kingdom in Europe. It also marked a turning point in the ongoing Islamo-Christian conflict around the Mediterranean. The following decades would see increasing papal involvement prompting and sponsoring wars to recover once-Christian lands that had been lost to the Muslims as long ago as the 7th and 8th centuries. In 1095, 4 years after Sicily's conquest by the Normans definitively came to an end, Pope Urban II launched the First Crusade to recover the holy city of Jerusalem for the Christians, ushering in the next epoch of Mediterranean history.

== Sources ==
- Cobb, P. (2014). The Race for Paradise: An Islamic History of the Crusades. Oxford. ISBN 978-0-19-953201-8.
- Houben, H. (2002). Roger II: A Ruler Between East and West. Cambridge. ISBN 0-521-65208-1.
- Lopez, Robert S. (1969). "The Norman Conquest of Sicily". In Setton, Kenneth Meyer (ed.). A History of the Crusades. Vol. 1. University of Wisconsin Press. pp. 54–67. ISBN 978-0299048341.
- Malaterra, Geoffrey (2005). The Deeds of Count Roger of Calabria and Sicily and His Brother Duke Robert Guiscard. Translated by Wolf, K. University of Michigan Press. ISBN 0-472-11459-X.
- Theotokis, G. (2010). "The Norman Invasion of Sicily, 1061–1072: Numbers and Military Tactics". War in History. 17 (4): 381–402. doi:10.1177/0968344510376463. S2CID 159817615.
- Kings and Generals (April 12, 2020). "Battle of Cerami 1063 - Norman-Muslim War for Sicily DOCUMENTARY". YouTube.
