= Matteo Camera =

Italian historian, antiquarian seller and numismatist

Matteo Camera (Amalfi, 20 November 1820 – Salerno, 2 December 1891) was an Italian historian and numismatist.

He primarily published works about history of Southern Italy and the town of Amalfi.

== Works ==
- Annali delle Due Sicilie
- Giovanni I e Carlo III di Durazzo
- Memorie storico diplomatiche di Amalfi
- Istoria della città e costiera di Amalfi
