= Rudolf, Count of Montescaglioso =

Italo-Norman noble

Rudolf (also Rudolph, Ralph, or Raoul, called Maccabeus, Maccabeo, or Maccabees; died 1108) was the second Norman count of Montescaglioso from the death of his father Robert in 1080.

During the three-year period between the death of the Guiscard in 1085 and the peace between his sons Bohemond and Roger Borsa, Rudolph and many other barons took advantage of the fraternal civil war to enhance their own lands and powers.

In 1087, Rudolf married Emma (1070–1120), the fourth and youngest daughter of Roger I of Sicily and his first wife Judith d'Évreux. She had previously been briefly engaged to Philip I of France and was then married for some years to William VI, Count of Auvergne. His brother Geoffrey died while on the First Crusade in the battle of Dorlylaeum. When Rudolf died without issue, Emma ruled his territories until her death. In 1124, her half brother Roger II invaded the county territory claiming it for the crown.
