= Roger I of Sicily =

Grand Count of Sicily from 1071 to 1101

Roger I
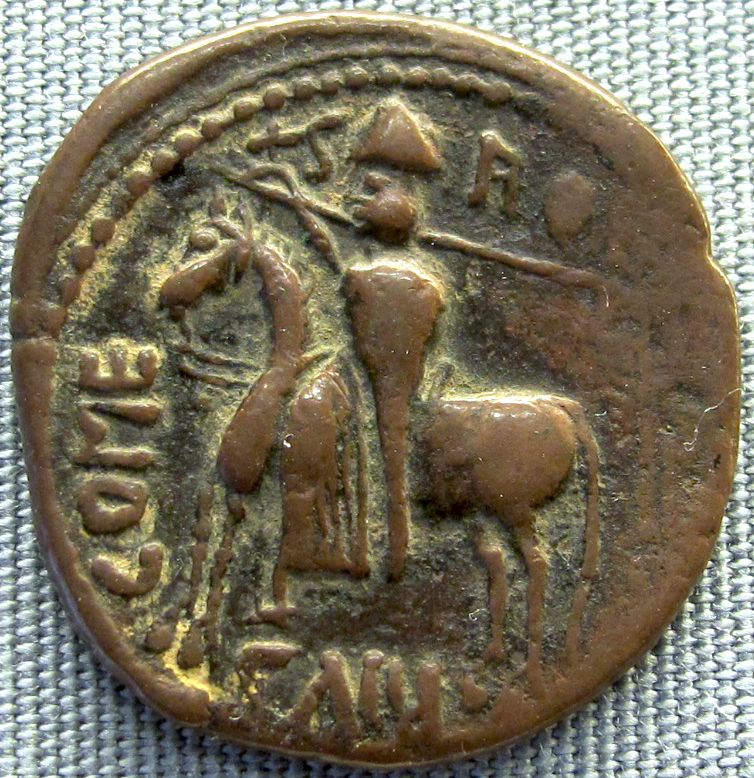
- Roger I as he appears on a trifollaro minted at Mileto

Grand Count of Sicily
- Reign: 1071–1101
- Predecessor: Robert Guiscard (as Lord)
- Successor: Simon of Hauteville
- Born: c. 1031; Probably Hauteville-la-Guichard, Duchy of Normandy
- Died: 22 June 1101; Mileto, Duchy of Apulia and Calabria
- Burial: Benedictine Abbey of the Holy Trinity, Mileto
- Spouse: Judith d'Évreux; Eremburga of Mortain; Adelaide del Vasto
- Issue more...: Jordan; Geoffrey, Count of Ragusa; Mauger, Count of Troina; Felicia, Queen of Hungary; Simon, Count of Sicily; Roger II of Sicily
- House: Hauteville
- Father: Tancred of Hauteville
- Mother: Fredisenda

Roger I (Italian: Ruggero; Arabic: رُجار, romanized: Rujār; Maltese: Ruġġieru; Norse: Rogeirr; c. 1031 – 22 June 1101), nicknamed "Roger Bosso" and "Grand Count Roger", (Note: Needs to be clarified. His official title was that of "Grand Count"; unclear if "Great Count" was a nickname or referred to his title.) was a Norman nobleman who became the first Grand Count of Sicily from 1071 to 1101.

As a member of the House of Hauteville, he participated in several military expeditions against the Emirate of Sicily (beginning in 1061). He was later invested with part of Sicily by his brother, Robert Guiscard, Duke of Apulia, in 1071. By 1090, he had conquered the entire island. In 1091, he conquered Malta. The state he created was merged with the Duchy of Apulia in 1127 and became the Kingdom of Sicily in 1130. His descendants in the male line continued to rule Sicily down to 1194.

== Early life ==
Roger was born in Normandy, probably in the village of Hauteville-la-Guichard, of which his father was seigneur. He was the youngest son of Tancred de Hauteville and his second wife Fressenda. Through his mother he was possibly grandson of Richard the Fearless. Little is known about his and his brothers' lives before the expeditions to Southern Italy.

== Arrival to Italy and Conquest of Calabria ==
Roger arrived in Southern Italy as a young man in the summer of 1057. The Benedictine monk Goffredo Malaterra, who compares Robert Guiscard and his brother Roger to "Joseph and Benjamin of old," gives this description of Roger:

He was a youth of the greatest beauty, of lofty stature, of graceful shape, most eloquent in speech and cool in counsel. He was far-seeing in arranging all his actions, pleasant and merry all with men; strong and brave, and furious in battle.

His travel to Italy, together with his brother Robert, was caused by the death of their older half-brother Humphrey, Count of Apulia. While Robert, being the oldest among the two, inherited the main title, Roger became his vassal after being given the newly conquered County of Calabria.

For a time, Roger lived like a bandit in his castle of Scalea, near Cosenza. In a treaty of 1062, the brothers divided the conquest so that each "was to have half of every castle and town in Calabria". Roger then established his court at Mileto. On Christmas 1061, he married Judith d'Évreux, daughter of the count of Évreux, William.

The two brothers then conquered Reggio, the only city in Calabria still under Greco-Roman control, after a long and difficult siege. The fort of Squillace, where the Byzantine soldiers took refuge, was taken too. From the fortresses of Calabria, the two brothers started planning the conquest of Sicily, at the time controlled by Muslims.

== Expeditions to Sicily ==
At the time, Sicily was ruled by Muslims, and the population was composed mostly of Byzantine Greek Christians. The Arab princes controlling the island had become all but independent from the sultan of Tunis.

Robert and Roger found the excuse to invade Sicily after the request for help from Ibn al-Thumna, emir of Catania, who was at war with his brother-in-law, Ibn al-Hawwas, emir of Agrigento. In May 1061 the brothers crossed from Reggio and captured Messina. From then on, they advanced almost undisturbed all the way to Castrogiovanni.

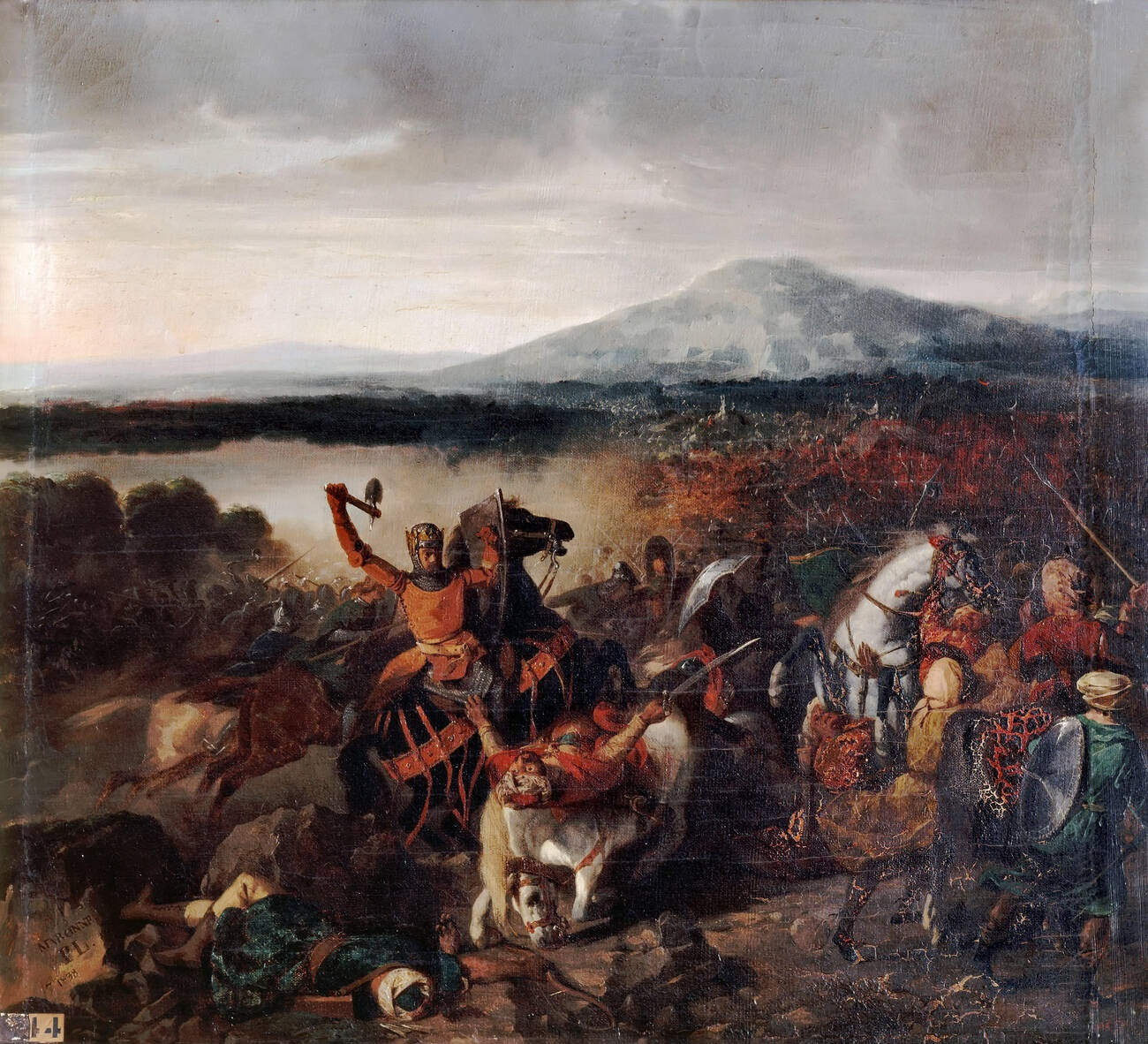
Roger I of Sicily at the Battle of Cerami (1063), in which he was victorious

A disagreement between Roger and Robert led the former to leave Sicily, but he quickly returned along with Countess Judith to defend the inhabitants of Troina, then threatened by the Muslims. He was well received by the Greek peasants. While Roger was seizing Nicosia, however, the same Greeks tried to capture the poorly-guarded countess, and Roger had to turn back to save his wife. Despite the Muslims joining forces with the Greeks, Roger managed to defeat them (Note: (according to chroniclers, the defeat was made possible because of the huge amounts of alcohol consumed by the Arab soldiers).) and continued his advance.

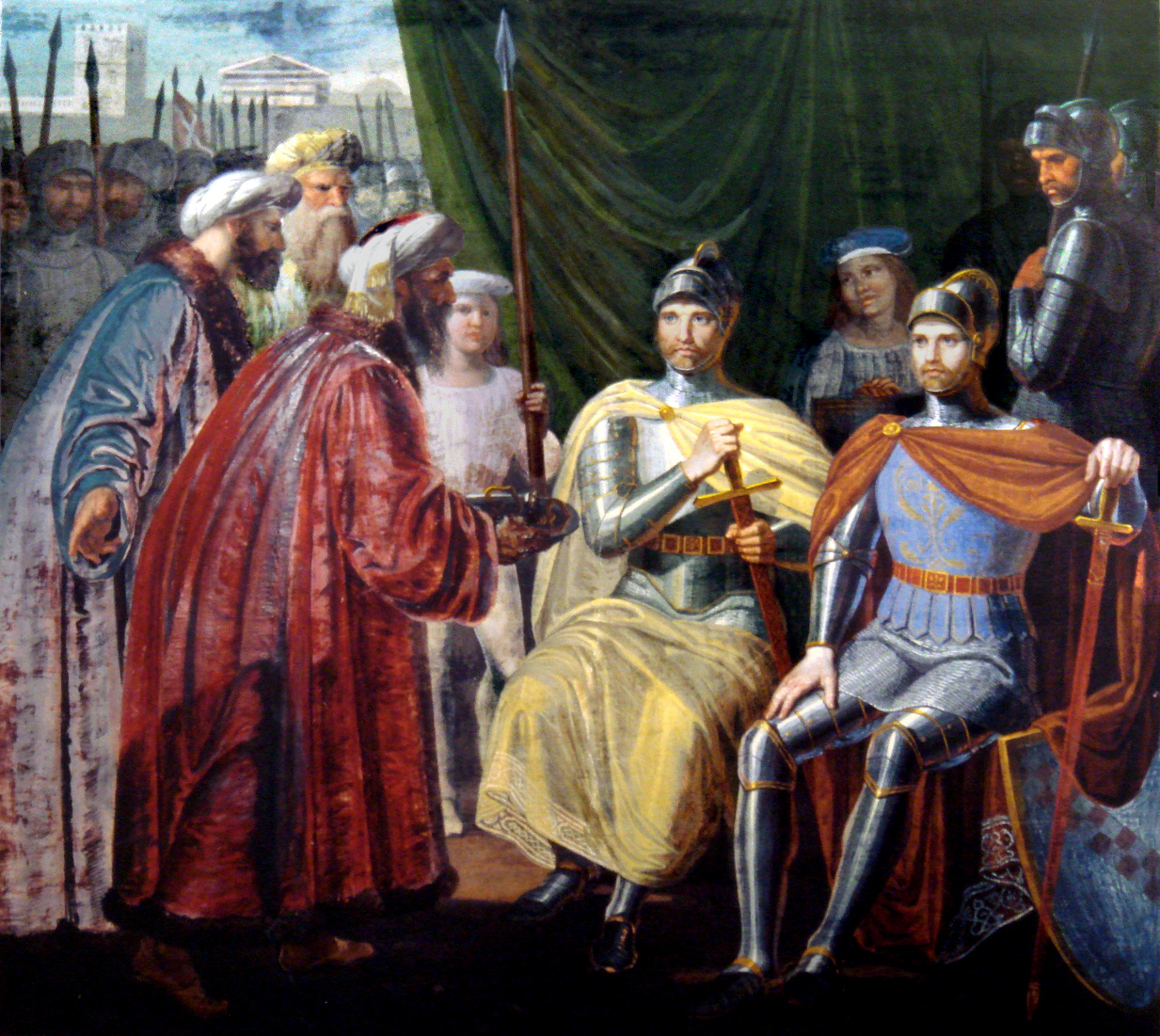
Roger I and Robert Guiscard receiving the keys of the city of Palermo from the Arabs

In June 1063, Roger defeated a Muslim army at the famous Battle of Cerami. Even if Goffredo Malaterra reports an utterly exaggerated account of the battle, we know that Serlo II, Roger's nephew, led a smaller army in the conflict. According to legend, Saint Michael Archangel, shining with light, appeared galloping in front of the Christians and guided them to victory.

After putting together an army of 500 soldiers, Roger tried to seize control of Palermo, but after three months of scarce results, he decided to abandon the idea. His demeanor kept increasing, and he won another important victory at the Battle of Misilmeri in 1068, against a much bigger Islamic army.

After Duke Robert conquered Bari, last Byzantine holding in Italy, in 1070, he redirected his focus to Sicily, and helped Roger in the conquest of the island's major cities. In 1071, Roger was given the title of Grand Count of Sicily, while Robert kept Messina and Val Demone for himself. The two brothers besieged Palermo on opposite sides, and the Muslims resisted for 5 months. Then Guiscard managed to open a door for his brother to enter the city, and on 10 January 1072 Palermo was finally taken. Few cities remained for Sicily to be fully controlled.

When Robert died in 1085, Roger, being the senior member in the family, had to return to Apulia to settle the dispute among Bohemond, Robert's first son by Alberada (considered illegitimate), and Roger Borsa, Robert's first son by Sikelgaita. In return for supporting Roger Borsa, he got to keep Calabria, which had been given to him by Robert, for himself, and was later given Palermo in 1091.

Returned to Sicily, Roger went to war with Benavert, emir of Syracuse and Noto. On May 1086, together with his son Jordan, Roger launched an attack on Syracuse. In the middle of the night they attacked the Saracen fleet, taken by surprise. Roger directly jumped on Benavert's galley, and the emir, frightened, tried to jump on another boat, but failed and drowned because of his heavy armor. Benavert's death caused confusion, and in October Syracuse surrendered because of hunger.

After Syracuse, in 1087 Agrigento fell to the Normans, together with Castrogiovanni, as they were both held by emir Kamut. During the siege of Butera in 1089, Roger was notified about the arrival of Pope Urban II at Troina, and had to leave the work to his men. He treated the Pope with utter respect and was given precious gifts. He then returned to Butera, which fell in 1090. Arrived at Mileto to celebrate his marriage to Adelaide del Vasto, he received some ambassadors from the city of Noto who asked for peace and surrendered to Sicily. Finally, in 1091, Roger controlled the whole island.

Roger's rule in Sicily became more absolute than that of Robert Guiscard in Italy. In addition, due to immigration by Lombards and Normans, Latin Christianity gradually replaced that of the Greek Byzantine tradition. At the enfeoffments of 1072 and 1092, no great undivided fiefs were created. The mixed Norman, French and Italian vassals all owed their benefices to the count. No feudal revolt of importance arose against Roger.

== Conquest of Malta ==
In 1091 Roger, in order to avoid an attack from North Africa, set sail with a fleet to conquer Malta. His ship reached the island before the rest. On landing, the few defenders the Normans encountered retreated and the following day Roger marched to the capital Mdina. Terms were discussed with the local qadi. It was agreed that the islands would become tributaries of the count himself and that the qadi should continue to administer the islands. With the treaty many Greek and other Christian prisoners were released, who chanted to Roger the Kyrie eleison. He left the islands with many who wished to join him and so many were on his ship that it nearly sank, according to Geoffrey Malaterra. The invasion was romanticized in later centuries, and legends arose that the Count gave the Maltese their red and white flag by cutting a part of his banner.

== Rule of Sicily ==
Politically supreme, the count also became master of the island's church. The Papacy, favouring a prince who had recovered Sicily from Greeks and Muslims, in 1098 granted Roger and his heirs the apostolic legateship of the island. Roger created new Latin bishoprics at Syracuse, Girgenti and elsewhere, nominating the bishops personally, while he turned the archbishopric of Palermo into a Catholic see. Of these bishops and other important clergy positions, a minority were French, and of those even fewer were Norman. Of the five new sees he founded, one bishop was Norman and three others were from other parts of France. He practiced general toleration towards Arabs and Greeks, even sponsoring the construction of over twelve Greek monasteries in the Val Demone region. In the cities, the Muslims, who had generally secured such rights in their terms of surrender, retained their mosques, their qadis, and freedom of trade; in the country, however, they became serfs. Roger drew the mass of his infantry from the Muslims; Saint Anselm, visiting him at the siege of Capua, 1098, found "the brown tents of the Arabs innumerable". Nevertheless, the Latin element began to prevail, as Lombards and other Italians flocked to the island in the wake of the conquest, and the conquest of Sicily proved decisive in the steady decline of Muslim power in the western Mediterranean from this time.

== Death and succession ==
Roger I died on 22 of June 1101 in Mileto and was buried at the Benedictine Abbey of the Holy Trinity. The abbey was destroyed in the earthquake of 1783. Its ruins are currently located in the Mileto Antica archaeological park.

Upon Roger's death, his son, Simon of Hauteville, became the Count of Sicily, with his mother, Adelaide del Vasto, acting as his regent. On 28 September 1105, at the age of 12, Simon died, and the title of count passed to his younger brother, Roger II of Sicily, with Adelaide continuing on as regent, being the mother of Roger II as well.

== Marriage and issue ==
Coat of arms of Roger I of Sicily

Roger had three known illegitimate sons:

- Jordan (c. 1060 – 1092), commander, predeceased his father
- A certain William, legitimacy unclear, maybe son by first or second marriage
- Geoffrey (died c. 1120), Count of Ragusa. Legitimacy unclear, maybe son by first or second marriage. He had no chance of inheriting as he was affected by leprosy. (Note: Goffredo Malaterra calls it "Morbus Elephantinus".)

Roger's first marriage took place in 1062, to Judith d'Évreux. The marriage produced only daughters:

- Flandina, first married to Hugh of Jarzé, first count of Paternò. When he died after 1075, she remarried to Henry del Vasto, second count of Paternò and brother of Adelaide del Vasto, Roger's third wife.
- Matilda (c. 1062 – before 1094), first married to Robert of Aceto, count of Eu and lord of Hastings. She was repudiated by her husband, and remarried in 1080 to Raymond IV of Toulouse.
- Adelisa (died before 1096), married in 1083 to Henry, Count of Monte Sant'Angelo
- Emma (c. 1070 – 1120), briefly engaged to Philip I of France; married, firstly, William VI of Auvergne and, secondly, Rudolf of Montescaglioso.

In 1077, a year after Judith's death, Roger married a second time, to Eremburga of Mortain. Their children were:

- Mauger (c. 1080 – c. 1100), Count of Troina
- Muriel (died 1119), married Josbert de Lucy
- Constance (1082 – after 1135), married Conrad II of Italy, son of Emperor Henry IV
- Felicia (died 1102), married Coloman, King of Hungary
- Judith (died 1136), married Robert I of Bassunvilla
- Sybilla, married Robert, son of Robert I of Burgundy.

In 1087 Eremburga died, and Roger remarried to Adelaide del Vasto, a sister of his son-in-law Henry del Vasto. Roger and Adelaide's children were:

- Matilda (died before 1094), married Ranulf II, Count of Alife and pretender to the Duchy of Apulia
- Simon (1093–1105), Count of Sicily
- Roger II (1095–1154), King of Sicily
- Maximilla, also called Matilda (died after 1137), married Ildebrandino VI Aldobrandeschi family.

One of Roger's daughters, named Matilda, married Guigues III, Count of Albon.

== Sources ==
- Alio, Jacqueline (2018). Queens of Sicily 1061-1266: The queens consort, regent and regnant of the Norman-Swabian era of the Kingdom of Sicily. Trinacria.
- Britt, Karen C. (2007). "Roger II of Sicily: Rex, Basileus, and Khalif? Identity, Politics, and Propaganda in the Cappella Palatina". Mediterranean Studies. 16. Penn State University Press: 21–45. doi:10.2307/41167003. JSTOR 41167003.
- Brown, Gordon S. (2003). The Norman Conquest of Southern Italy and Sicily. McFarland & Company, Inc.
- Burkhardt, Stefan; Foerster, Thomas (2013). Norman Tradition and Transcultural Heritage. Taylor & Francis Group.
- Curtis, Edmund (1912). Roger of Sicily and the Normans in lower Italy, 1016-1154. G. P. Putnam's Sons; The Knickerbocker Press.
- Houben, Hubert (2002). Roger II of Sicily: Ruler between East and West. Translated by Loud, Graham A.; Milburn, Diane. Cambridge University Press.
- Jansen, Katherine L.; Drell, Joanna; Andrews, Frances, eds. (2009). Medieval Italy: Texts in Translation. Translated by Loud, G.A. University of Pennsylvania Press.
- Luscombe, David; Riley-Smith, Jonathan, eds. (2004). The New Cambridge Medieval History: Volume 4, C.1024-c.1198, Part II. Cambridge University Press.
- Malaterra, Galfredus; Wolf, Kenneth Baxter (2005). The deeds of Count Roger of Calabria and Sicily and of his brother Duke Robert Guiscard. University of Michigan Press.
- Robinson, I. S. (1999). Henry IV of Germany 1056-1106. Cambridge University Press.

Preceded by New creation	Count of Sicily; 1071–1101	Succeeded by Simon
