= Mileto =

Comune in Calabria, Italy

Mileto Míletos (Greek)
- Comune
- Comune di Mileto
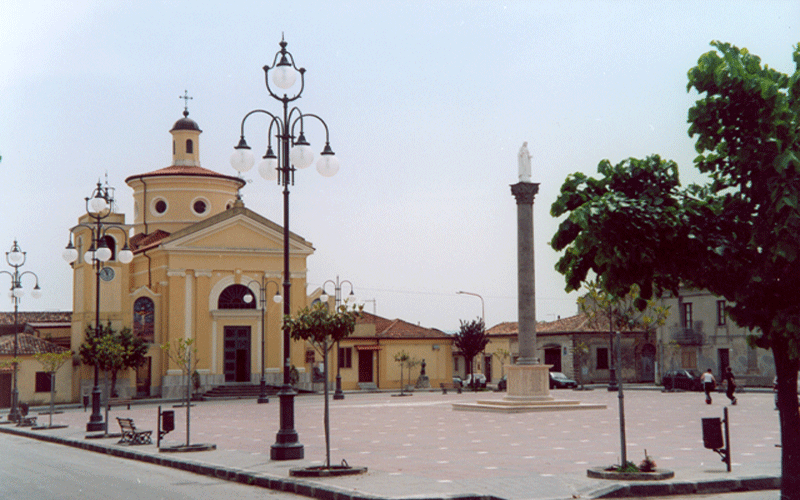
- Church of SS. Trinità.

- Coat of arms

- Location within Italy Location within Calabria
- Coordinates: 38°37′N 16°4′E
- Country: Italy
- Region: Calabria
- Province: Vibo Valentia (VV)
- Frazioni: Calabrò, Comparni, Paravati, San Giovanni

Area
  - Total: 34.9 km^{2} (13.5 sq mi)
- Elevation: 365 m (1,198 ft)

Population (2007)
  - Total: 7,058
  - Density: 202/km^{2} (524/sq mi)
- Demonym: Miletesi
- Time zone: UTC+1 (CET)
  - Summer (DST): UTC+2 (CEST)
- Postal code: 89852
- Dialing code: 0963

Mileto (Calabrian: Militu; Ancient Greek: Μίλητος, romanized: Míletos) is a comune (municipality) in the Province of Vibo Valentia in the Italian region Calabria, located about 60 kilometres (37 mi) southwest of Catanzaro and about 6 kilometres (4 mi) south of Vibo Valentia.

Mileto is the seat of the Roman Catholic diocese of Mileto.

== History ==
According to tradition, the city was founded, not far from the site of ancient Medma by Greek fugitives from Miletus (Miletos in Greek; hence the name) in Anatolia, which had been destroyed by Darius.

Mileto was a Norman stronghold under Roger I of Sicily, the last great leader of the Norman conquest of southern Italy. He died here of old age in 1101. Roger's son and also a Count of Sicily, Simon died in the town in 1105, when he was 12 years old.

Simon's brother and successor Roger II was born here in 1095. He began his rule as Count of Sicily in 1105 and later became Duke of Apulia and Calabria in 1127. He became the first King of Sicily in 1130.

In 1807 it was the location of the Battle of Mileto between the French and Neapolitan armies.

Mileto suffered from numerous earthquakes, especially from those of 1905 and 1906, and, although in a less degree, from that of 28 December 1908, which destroyed Reggio and Messina.

== Notable people ==
- Natuzza Evolo (mystic of 20th century)
- Roger II of Sicily (first King of Sicily)
