= Adelaide del Vasto =

Countess of Sicily (1089–1101) and Queen of Jerusalem (1112–1117)

- Countess of Sicily; Queen consort of Jerusalem
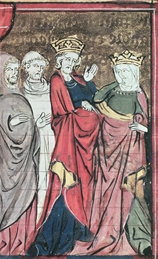
- Born: c. 1075
- Died: 16 April 1118 (aged 43)
- Spouses: Roger I, Count of Sicily (m. 1089; died 1101) Baldwin I, King of Jerusalem (m. 1112; ann. 1117)
- Issue: Simon of Sicily; Roger II of Sicily
- House: Aleramici
- Father: Manfred del Vasto

Adelaide del Vasto (Adelasia, Azalaïs) (c. 1075 – 16 April 1118) was countess of Sicily as the third spouse of Roger I of Sicily, and Queen consort of Jerusalem by marriage to Baldwin I of Jerusalem. She served as regent of Sicily during the minority of her son Roger II of Sicily from 1101 until 1112.

Her rule occurred between the previous reign of multiple Arabian dynasties and the formal declaration of the Kingdom of Sicily, placing her between two massive shifts in Sicilian identity. Under Adelaide, the economic and social shifts of Norman conquest led to many rebellions and societal tension, which she handled with frightening swiftness.

She was the daughter of Manfred del Vasto (brother of Boniface del Vasto, marquess of Western Liguria, and Anselm del Vasto).

Her paternal grandparents were Teto II del Vasto, and his wife Bertha of Turin, daughter of margrave Ulric Manfred II of Turin.

== Countess consort of Sicily ==
In 1089, Adelaide married Roger I while her sister married Roger's illegitimate son Jordan. Roger I died in 1101, and Adelaide ruled as regent of Sicily for her young sons Simon and Roger II. During her tenure, the emir Christodulus rose to preeminence at the court and Palermo was settled as the capital of the realm.

Adelaide came into regency at a time when Norman identity was heavily influenced by primary source writing. While Norman identity was called into question centuries later, 11th century rhetoric characterized Normans as not just mercenaries of Lombards, but as an incredibly masculine people. Characteristics such as their penchant for overcoming exile and a need for conquest dominated the scarce primary sources and heavily skewed perception of Normans to masculinity. This impacted and downplayed Adelaide’s role as regent significantly, marking her as an interim ruler between her son’s minority.

Almost immediately after Adelaide assumed the position of regent, rebellions broke out in parts of Calabria and Sicily. The writings of the Norman monk Orderic Vitalis recount that Adelaide put an end to these episodes of insurgency with severity. The use of great force in suppressing such rebellions, however, did not tarnish her reputation as a ruler. In fact, Abbot Alexander of Telese's history of Roger I describes Adelaide as

“a most prudent woman, [she] exercised the cares of the government and ruled over the county.”

A Greek and Arab charter from 1109 describes Adelaide as “the great female ruler, the malikah of Sicily and Calabria, the protector of the Christian faith.”

Sicily was culturally diverse during Adelaide’s rule, consisting of both Latin Christians and Arabian Muslims living together in cities with respective governmental and judicial bodies. Before the Kingdom of Sicily came into prominence, Christians and Muslims often intermingled, some even married. Decades later Christians would formally come into power, and the power dynamic would greatly shift, but under Adelaide, social stability remained.

Adelaide's older son, Simon, was enthroned when he reached the appropriate age (around 8 or 9 years old) but died in 1105, leaving Adelaide regent again until Roger II reached his majority in 1112. Adelaide's second son, Roger II, took control over control of the state in 1112, but there is evidence that Adelaide continued to play a central role in the governing of the island as her signature can still be seen on official documents even after 1112.

== Queen consort of Jerusalem ==
Meanwhile, in Jerusalem, after the death of Baldwin's first wife Godehilde during the First Crusade, Baldwin married an Armenian noblewoman traditionally known as Arda. Arda was useful in an alliance with the Armenians while Baldwin was Count of Edessa, but when he became King of Jerusalem in 1100 he seemed to have little use for an Armenian wife, and Arda was forced into a convent around 1105.

In 1112 a new marriage was sought for the king. Arnulf of Chocques, Latin Patriarch of Jerusalem, suggested that Baldwin marry Adelaide, as Roger II was now old enough to rule Sicily alone. Baldwin sent ambassadors to Sicily, and somewhat hastily agreed to any terms which Adelaide might have; Adelaide demanded that their son, should they have one, inherit Jerusalem, and if they had no children, the kingdom would pass to her own son Roger II.

Adelaide was already well into middle age and no new heir was immediately forthcoming. The king was blamed for a bigamous marriage (as Arda was still alive) and the Patriarch Arnulf was deposed. Pope Paschal II agreed to reinstate him in 1116, provided that he annul the marriage between Baldwin and Adelaide. Baldwin agreed, after falling ill and assuming that renouncing his sin of bigamy would cure him. In 1117 the annulment was performed at Acre, and Adelaide sailed back to Sicily.

Adelaide died on 16 April 1118 and was buried in Patti. Roger II was outraged at the treatment of his mother and never forgave the Kingdom of Jerusalem. Almost thirty years later, Roger still refused to give assistance to the Crusader states during the Second Crusade. William of Tyre wrote of the impact of the incident:

“Adelaide's son was angered beyond measure, because she had been sent back. He conceived a mortal hatred against the kingdom and its people. Other Christian princes in various parts of the world, either by coming in person or by giving liberal gifts, have amplified our infant realm. But he and his heirs at the present time have never become reconciled to us to the extent of a single friend word. Although they could have relieved our necessities by council and aid far more easily than other prince, yet they have always remembered their wrongs and have unjustly avenged upon the whole people the fault of a single individual.”

== Sources ==
- Alio, Jacqueline. 2018. Queens of Sicily 1061-1266. New York: Trinacria.
- Brown, Gordon S. 2003. The Norman Conquest of Southern Italy and Sicily. Jefferson: McFarland & Company.
- Cilento, Adele and Alessandro Vanoli.2008. Arabs and Normans in Sicily and the South of Italy. New York: Riverside.
- Hamel, Pasquale 1997. Adelaide del Vasto, Regina di Gerusalemme. Palermo: Sellerio Editore, 1997.
- Hamilton, Bernard 1978. "Women in the Crusader States: The Queens of Jerusalem", in Medieval Women, edited by Derek Baker. Ecclesiastical History Society, 1978.
- Houban, Hubert 2002. Roger II of Sicily: A Ruler between East and West. Cambridge, Cambridge University Press.
- Houben, Hubert. 2002. Roger II of Sicily: A Ruler between East and West. Cambridge: Cambridge University Press.
- Jordan, Jennifer Lynn 2021. "Mediterranean Men: Changing Norman Masculinities in the Eleventh- and Twelfth-Century Histories of the Kingdom of Sicily and the Principality of Antioch." State University of New York at Stony Brook.
- Kelly, Samantha 2003, The New Solomon: Robert of Naples 1309-1343 and Fourteenth-century Kingship. Leiden, Brill.
- Loud, Graham A. 2012. Roger II and the Making of the Kingdom of Sicily. Manchester: Manchester University Press.
- Malaterra, Geoffrey 2006. "The Deeds of Count Roger of Calabria and Sicily and of his Brother Duke Robert Guiscard", Goffredo Malaterra, fl. 1097, "De rebus gestis Rogerii ...." English translation by Kenneth Baxter Wolf, University of Michigan Press, 2005, ISBN 0-472-11459-X, Chapter 4.14, 189 – 190.
- Mayer, Hans Eberhard 1972. "Studies in the History of Queen Melisende of Jerusalem." Dumbarton Oaks Papers 26: 93-182.
- Metcalfe, Alexander 2011. Muslims and Christians in Norman Sicily: Arabic-Speakers and the End of Islam. London, Routledge.
- Alan V. Murray, The Crusader Kingdom of Jerusalem: A Dynastic History, 1099-1125. Prosopographica and Genealogica, 2000.
- Takayama, Hiroshi 1993. The Administration of the Norman Kingdom of Sicily. Leiden: E. J. Brill.
- Wolf, Kenneth Baxter 2005. The Deeds of Count Roger of Calabria and Sicily and of His Brother Duke Robert Guiscard. Ann Arbor: University of Michigan Press.

Adelaide del Vasto Aleramici Born: c. 1075 Died: 16 April 1118
Royal titles
Vacant Title last held by Arda of Armenia	Queen consort of Jerusalem; 1113–1117	Succeeded by Morphia of Melitene
