= Abd al-Aziz ibn Shaddad =

ʿIzz al-Dīn Abū Muḥammad ʿAbd al-ʿAzīz ibn Shaddād ibn Tamīm ibn al-Muʿizz ibn Bādīs (d. after 1186), known as ʾAbū al-Gharīb ʿIzz al-Dīn al-Sanhāji or Abū l-ʿArab al-Qayrawānī, was a Zirid chronicler and prince of the Zirid dynasty.

== Biography ==
Abd al-Aziz ibn Shaddad's birth date is not known. He was a member of the Zirid dynasty, the grandson of Tamim ibn al-Mu'izz and nephew of Yahya ibn Tamim. He was part of the entourage of the last Zirid ruler al-Hasan ibn Ali since he said that he had consulted a book of the library of this sultan. In 1148, the city of al-Mahdiyya was captured by George of Antioch. Ibn Shaddad probably fled the city with al-Hasan to the court of the Almohad caliph Abd al-Mu'min. In 1156-1157, he was at the sicilian city Palermo. He went to Syria, where he settled at Damascus no later than 1175-1176. In this later city he communicated his grandfather Tamim's Diwan to the scholar Imad ad-Din al-Isfahani. He was still there in 1186 as he recorded the testimony of a citizen of al-Mahdiyya on Ifriqya's events the same year.

== Works ==
Ibn Saddad was the author of a chronicle of Kairouan whose full title was:

- Kitab al-Jam' wa 'l-bayan fi akhbar al-Qayrawan wa fi man fiha wa fi sa'ir bilad al-Maghrib min al-mulukwa 'l-a'yan or Kitab al-Jam' wa 'l-Bayan fi akhbar al-Maghrib wa 'l-Qayrawan
  (الجمع والبيان في أخبار القيروان وما فيها وفي سائر بلاد المغرب من الملوك والأيام)

This work was used as a primary source by Abu'l-Fida, Ibn al-Athir, Ibn Idhari, Ibn Khaldun, Ibn Khallikan, al-Tijani, al-Maqrizi and al-Nuwayri. And the 17th-century historian of Kairouan, Ibn Abi Dinar regretted not using his work.

Another work he wrote was a chronicle of Sicily, both of this works are now lost.

== Bibliography ==
- Idris, Hady Roger (1962). La Berbérie Orientale sous les Zirides, Xème-XIIème siècles (in French). Adrien-Maisonneuve.
- Johns, Jeremy (2002). Arabic Administration in Norman Sicily: The Royal Diwan. Cambridge University Press. ISBN 978-1-139-44019-6.
- Talbi, M. (1986) [1971]. "Ibn S̲h̲addād". In Lewis, B.; Ménage, V. L.; Pellat, C.; Schacht, J. (eds.). Encyclopaedia of Islam. Vol. III (2nd ed.). Leiden, Netherlands: E. J. BRILL. ISBN 9004081186.
