= Mahdia campaign of 1123 =

1123 campaign by the Normans against the Zirid dynasty

- Part of Zirid–Norman wars
Date	21 July – 8 August 1123
Location	Cap Dimas island, near Mahdia, Tunisia.
Result	Zirid Victory

Belligerents
Zirid Emirate	Kingdom of Sicily; Hauteville family; Supported by Bedouin tribes

Commanders and leaders
Hasan ibn Ali; Vizier Sandal	Roger II of Sicily; Christodulus; George of Antioch

Strength
Unknown	Navy: 300 vessels (Galleyes, transports); Army: 30,000 infantry 1,000 cavalry

Casualties and losses
Unknown	200 ships destroyed c. 30,000 killed

The Mahdia campaign of 1123 was a major military operation in 1123 during the Zirid–Norman Wars. Following Roger II's alliance with the Banu Jami' during their revolt against the Zirids, Emir Hasan ibn Ali retaliated by launching an invasion of Calabria alongside Almoravids. In response to these escalating conflicts, a Norman counter-campaign culminated in a crushing defeat outside the walls of Dimas Island near ancient Mahdia, resulting in the total destruction of the Norman army and navy.

== Background ==
In 1117, the governor of Gabes the Arab leader Rafi‘ ibn Makki sought to secede from the Zirid emirate; consequently, the ships of Emir Ali ibn Yahya imposed a complete blockade on the port of Gabes. In early 1118, Roger II became involved in the conflict after the city's ruler appealed to the Count of Sicily for aid. Rafi‘ called upon Roger II, who equipped a fleet of 24 warships specifically galley to break the blockade; however, the Zirid fleet intercepted them and destroyed a number of the vessels.

This confrontation marked the beginning of the unraveling of the alliance Roger I had forged with Tamim ibn al-Mu‘izz in the late eleventh century. Tensions were exacerbated by ‘Ali’s detention of Sicilian merchants active in Mahdia though Roger II eventually succeeded, through repeated communications, in persuading ‘Ali ibn Yahya ibn Tamim to release them and by the Zirid ruler’s refusal of the Sicilian count’s request to renew their treaties and alliance. When Roger II persisted, sending letters marked by arrogance and threats that violated diplomatic norms, the Zirid emir ignored him, dismissed his envoys without a reply, and immediately began preparing for war against him. Consequently, ‘Ali sought an alliance with the Almoravids in anticipation of the Norman threat.

In the early 1120s, two key developments prompted Roger II to intervene directly against the Zirids. The first was the death of Ali ibn Yahya ibn Tamim in 1121 and the succession of his twelve year old son, al-Hasan an event that sparked a wave of unrest across North Africa. The second was a joint Almoravid-Zirid raid on Calabria in 1122, led by Abu Abdallah Muhammad ibn Maymun, which resulted in the capture of Nicotera.

== Campaign ==
In response to the Zirid-Almoravid alliance and their invasion of Calabria, Roger II dispatched a naval fleet from Marsala in 1123 under the command of George of Antioch and Admiral Christodoulos. The fleet comprised 300 galleys carrying 30,000 infantrymen and 1,000 knights to attack the Zirids. Although the expedition encountered a storm near Marsala, the ships reached the island of Pantelleria and proceeded toward Mahdia; there, on July 21, the Norman forces disembarked on a coast 10 miles from the city and succeeded through bribery in winning over an Arab-Bedouin garrison to secure a fortress known as Dimas, which overlooked their position.

However, two days later, the young Emir Al-Hasan and his vizier Sandal launched a night attack on the fortress of Dimas. This threw the attacking forces into a state of panic, forcing them to flee to their ships and leaving the Dimas garrison isolated and besieged. Despite repeated attempts by the fleet to rescue their stranded men, adverse weather and the Zirid forces' steadfast maintenance of the siege thwarted these efforts. Ultimately, Roger’s armies suffered a crushing defeat and the invasion ended in total failure; the Normans lost two-thirds of their naval vessels, while the remnants of their forces were completely annihilated on the shore during the night of August 7–8, though some historical accounts place the event on the 17th of the same month.

== See also ==
- Mahdia campaign of 1087
