= Admiral =

Highest rank of naval officer

Admiral is one of the highest ranks in many navies. In the Commonwealth nations and the United States, a "full" admiral is equivalent to a "full" general or air chief marshal in the army or the air force. Admiral is ranked above vice admiral and below admiral of the fleet, or fleet admiral.

== Etymology ==
The word admiral in Middle English comes from Anglo-French amiral, "commander", from Medieval Latin admiralis, admirallus. These evolved from the Arabic amīral (أمير الـ) – amīr (أمير) [ʔmjr], "king, prince, chief, leader, nobleman, lord, a governor, commander, or person who rules over a number of people" and al (الـ), the Arabic definite article meaning "the." In Arabic, admiral is also represented as Amīr al-Baḥr (أمير البحر), where al-Baḥr (البحر) means the sea.

The 1818 edition of Samuel Johnson's A Dictionary of the English Language, edited and revised by the Rev. Henry John Todd, states that the term:

[...] has been traced to the Arab. emir or amir, lord or commander, and the Gr. ἄλιος, the sea, q. d. prince of the sea. The word is written both with and without the d, in other languages, as well as our own. Barb. Lat. admirallus and amiralius. V. Ducange. Barb. Græc. ἄμηραλιος. V. Meursii Gloss. Græco-Barbarum, edit. 1610. p. 29. Fr. admiral and amiral. Dan. the same. Germ. ammiral. Dutch, admirael or ammirael. Ital. ammiraglio. Sp. almirante. Minsheu, in his Spanish Dictionary, says 'almiralle is a king in the Arabian language.' Amrayl is used by Robert of Gloucester, in the sense of a prince, or governour.

The quote from John Minsheu's Dictionarie in Spanish and English (1599), given in Johnson's Dictionary, has been confirmed as being accurate. Additionally, the definition of Amīr (أمير), as given in Edward William Lane's Arabic-English Lexicon, concurs, in part, with Minsheu's definition, stating that the term means "One having, holding, or possessing, command; a commander; a governor; a lord; a prince, or king."

While other Greek words of the period existed to indicate "belonging to the sea," or "of the sea," the now obsolete Gr. ἄλιος mentioned in Johnson's Dictionary is expressly defined as "of the sea, Lat. marinus, epith. of sea-gods, nymphs, etc."

Though there are multiple meanings for the Arabic Amīr (أمير), the literal meaning of the phrase Amīr al-Baḥr (أمير البحر) is "Prince of the Sea." This position, versus "commander of the sea," is demonstrated by legal practices prevailing in the Ottoman Empire, whereas it was only possible for Phanariots to qualify for attaining four princely positions, those being grand dragoman, dragoman of the fleet, and the voivodees of Moldavia and Wallachia. Those Phanariots who attained the princely position of dragoman of the fleet served under the Ottoman admiral having administration of the Aegean islands and the Anatolian coast.

Modern acknowledgement of the phrase Amīr-al-Baḥr (أمير البحر) meaning "Prince of the Sea" includes a speech made in an official U.S. military ceremony conducted in an Arabic port, and a news article published by an Arabic news outlet: On 24 May 2012, in a change of command ceremony aboard aircraft carrier USS Enterprise (CVN 65), while docked at Khalifa Bin Salman Port, Bahrain, U.S. Marine Corps Gen. James Mattis, Commander, U.S. Central Command, introduced Vice Admiral Mark I. Fox as "Admiral Fox, the prince of the sea, emir of the sea – to translate 'admiral' from the Arabic to English;" On 04 Feb 2021, in an announcement of his coronavirus-related death, the Arabic news website Saudi 24 News referred to Admiral Edmond Chagoury by the title "Prince of the Sea."

One alternate etymology proposes that the term admiral evolved, instead, from the title of Amīr al-Umarāʾ (أمير الأمراء). Under the reign of the Buyid dynasty (934 to 1062) of Iraq and Iran, the title of Amīr al-Umarāʾ, which means prince of princes, came to denote the heir-apparent, or crown prince.

This alternate etymology states that the term was in use for the Greco-Arab naval leaders (e.g. Christodulus) in the Norman-Arab-Byzantine culture of Norman Sicily, which had formerly been ruled by Arabs, at least by the early 11th century. During this time, the Norman Roger II of Sicily (1095–1154) employed a Greek Christian, known as George of Antioch, who previously had served as a naval commander for several North African Muslim rulers. Roger styled George in Abbasid fashion as Amir of Amirs, or Amīr al-Umarāʾ, with the title becoming Latinized in the 13th century as ammiratus ammiratorum.

The Sicilians and later the Genoese took the first two parts of the term from their Aragon opponents and used them as one word, amiral. The French gave their sea commanders similar titles while in Portuguese and Spanish the word changed to almirante. As the word was used by people speaking Latin or Latin-based languages it gained the "d" and endured a series of different endings and spellings leading to the English spelling admyrall in the 14th century and to admiral by the 16th century.

The etymology of a word does not suggest the antiquity of the word as it may have appeared in other languages with entirely different pronunciations. The Greek ναύαρχος, for instance, which is pronounced "naúarkhos", existed from very ancient times in Greece. While ναύαρχος may be defined as "admiral" as used by Plutarch in his Parallel Lives, the very pronunciation of ναύαρχος demonstrates that it is not a part of the etymology for the English word "admiral."

== History ==
The word "admiral" has come to be almost exclusively associated with the highest naval rank in most of the world's navies, equivalent to the army rank of general. However, this was not always the case; for example, in some European countries prior to the end of World War II, admiral was the third highest naval rank after general admiral and grand admiral.

The rank of admiral has also been subdivided into various grades, several of which are historically extinct while others remain in use in most present-day navies. The Royal Navy used the colours red, white, and blue, in descending order to indicate seniority of its admirals until 1864; for example, Horatio Nelson's highest rank was vice-admiral of the white. The generic term for these naval equivalents of army generals is flag officer. Some navies have also used army-type titles for them, such as the Cromwellian "general at sea".

== NATO code ==
While the rank is used in most of NATO countries, it is ranked differently depending on the country.

NATO code	Country	English equivalent	
NATO code	Country	UK	US
OF-9	Belgium, Bulgaria, Canada, Croatia, Denmark, Estonia, France, Germany, Italy, Montenegro, Norway, Poland, Portugal, Romania, Slovenia, Turkey,	Admiral	Admiral
OF-8	Albania, Spain	Vice admiral	Vice admiral

== Admiral insignia by country ==
Admiral
Albanian Navy

Almirante
Argentine Navy

Admiral
Royal Australian Navy

Admiral
Azerbaijani Navy

Admiral
Bangladesh Navy

Admiraal
Amiral
Belgian Navy

Almirante
Bolivian Naval Force

Almirante
Brazilian Navy

Адмирал
Admiral
Bulgarian Navy

Admiral
Amiral
Royal Canadian Navy

Almirante
Chilean Navy

Almirante
Colombian Navy

Amiral
Navy of DR of Congo

Admiral
Croatian Navy

Almirante
Cuban Revolutionary Navy

Admiral
Royal Danish Navy

Almirante
Dominican Navy

Almirante
Ecuadorian Navy

Admiral
Estonian Navy

Amiraali
(Swedish: Amiral)
Finnish Navy

Amiral
French Navy

Amiral
Gabonese Navy

Admiral
German Navy

Admiral
Ghana Navy

Admiral
एडमिरल
Indian Navy

Ammiraglio
Italian Navy

Amiral
Navy of Ivory Coast

Адмирал
Admïral
Kazakh Naval Forces

Amiral
Madagascar Navy

Almirante
Mexican Navy

Amiral
Montenegrin Navy

Amiral
Royal Moroccan Navy

Almirante
Mozambique Naval Command

Admiral
Nigerian Navy

Admiral
Royal Norwegian Navy

Admiral
Pakistan Navy

Almirante
Paraguayan Navy

Almirante
Peruvian Navy

Admiral
Philippine Navy

Admirał
Polish Navy

Almirante
Portuguese Navy

Amiral
Romanian Naval Forces

Адмирал
Admiral
Russian Navy

Адмирал
Admiral
Serbian River Flotilla

Admiral
Slovenian Navy

Admiral
South African Navy

Almirante
Spanish Navy

Admiral
Sri Lanka Navy

Amiral
Swedish Navy

Amiral
(Arabic: فريق أول بالبحرية, romanized: Fariq 'awal bialbahria)
Tunisia Navy

Admiral
Turkmen Naval Forces

Адмірал
Admiral
Ukrainian Navy

Admiral
Royal Navy

Admiral
United States Navy

Admiral
United States Coast Guard

Almirante
National Navy of Uruguay

Almirante
Bolivarian Navy of Venezuela

== National ranks ==
- Admiral (Australia)
- Admiral (Bangladesh)
- Admiral (Canada)
- Admiral (Denmark)
- Admiral (Germany)
- Admiral (India)
- Admiral (Netherlands)
- Admiral (Pakistan)
- Admiral (Russia)
- Admiral of Castile
- Admiral (Sri Lanka)
- Admiral (Sweden)
- Admiral (Ukraine)
- Admiral (United Kingdom)
- Admiral (United States)

== See also ==
- Admiralissimo
- Admiralty
- Comparative military ranks
- Artemisia I, earliest known female admiral in ancient world
- Isabel Barreto, first female admiral in modern world
- Laksamana, native title for naval leaders in Indonesia and Malaysia
- Keumalahayati, earliest female admiral (the first female Laksamana) in modern world
- Nebraska Admiral
- Ranks and insignia of NATO navies' officers
