= Ibn Shaddad =

Ibn Shaddad can refer to:

- Abd al-Aziz ibn Shaddad, 12th-century Zirid chronicler
- Antarah ibn Shaddad (fl. 580), pre-Islamic Arab hero and poet
- Baha ad-Din ibn Shaddad, 12th-century jurist and biographer of Saladin
- Izz al-Din ibn Shaddad, 13th-century geographer and historian
- Muhammad ibn Shaddad (died 971), founder of the Kurdish Shaddadid dynasty
