= Norman–Arab–Byzantine culture =

High Mediaeval cultural confluence in north Africa, southern Italy, and Sicily

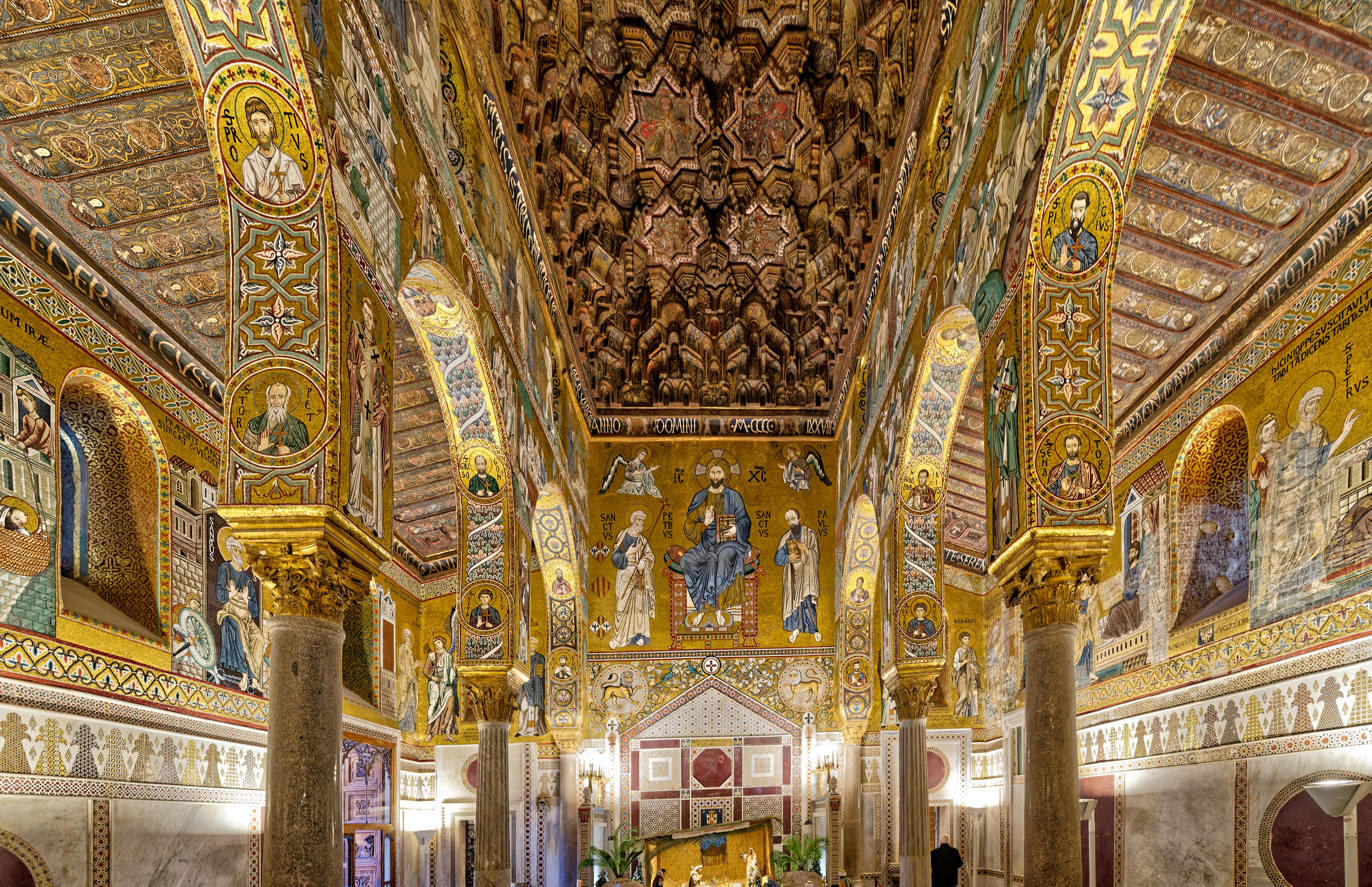
The Capella Palatina at Palermo

The term Norman–Arab–Byzantine culture, Norman–Sicilian culture or, less inclusively, Norman–Arab culture (sometimes the "Arab–Norman civilization"), refers to the interaction of the Norman, Byzantine Greek, Latin, and Arab cultures following the Norman conquest of the former Emirate of Sicily and North Africa from 1061 to around 1250. The civilization resulted from numerous exchanges in the cultural and scientific fields, based on the tolerance shown by the Normans towards the Latin- and Greek-speaking Christian populations and the former Arab Muslim settlers. As a result, Sicily under the Normans became a crossroad for the interaction between the Norman and Latin Catholic, Byzantine–Orthodox, and Arab–Islamic cultures.

== Norman conquest of southern Italy ==
The first Normans arrived in Southern Italy during the High Middle Ages, between the years 1000 and 1030. The de Hautevilles had enjoyed a mutually beneficial relationship with the papacy in the period leading up to their arrival in Southern Italy, with the Church recognizing them as legitimate lords in return for their military allegiance. The Normans would seize upon divisions between the Lombards and Byzantines in the region in order to establish a foothold, and they would establish a capital at Aversa in 1030. A defining victory for the Normans would come in 1053, when they defeated a papal force constituted of Lombards and imperial Byzantine forces at Civitella sul Fortore. The battle would see them also capture Pope Leo IX, who had been backing the force opposing them. Robert Guiscard would mount later campaigns after his conquest of Sicily to further Norman influence in Southern Italy, notably capturing Bari in 1071 and Salerno in 1077.

== Norman conquest of Sicily ==
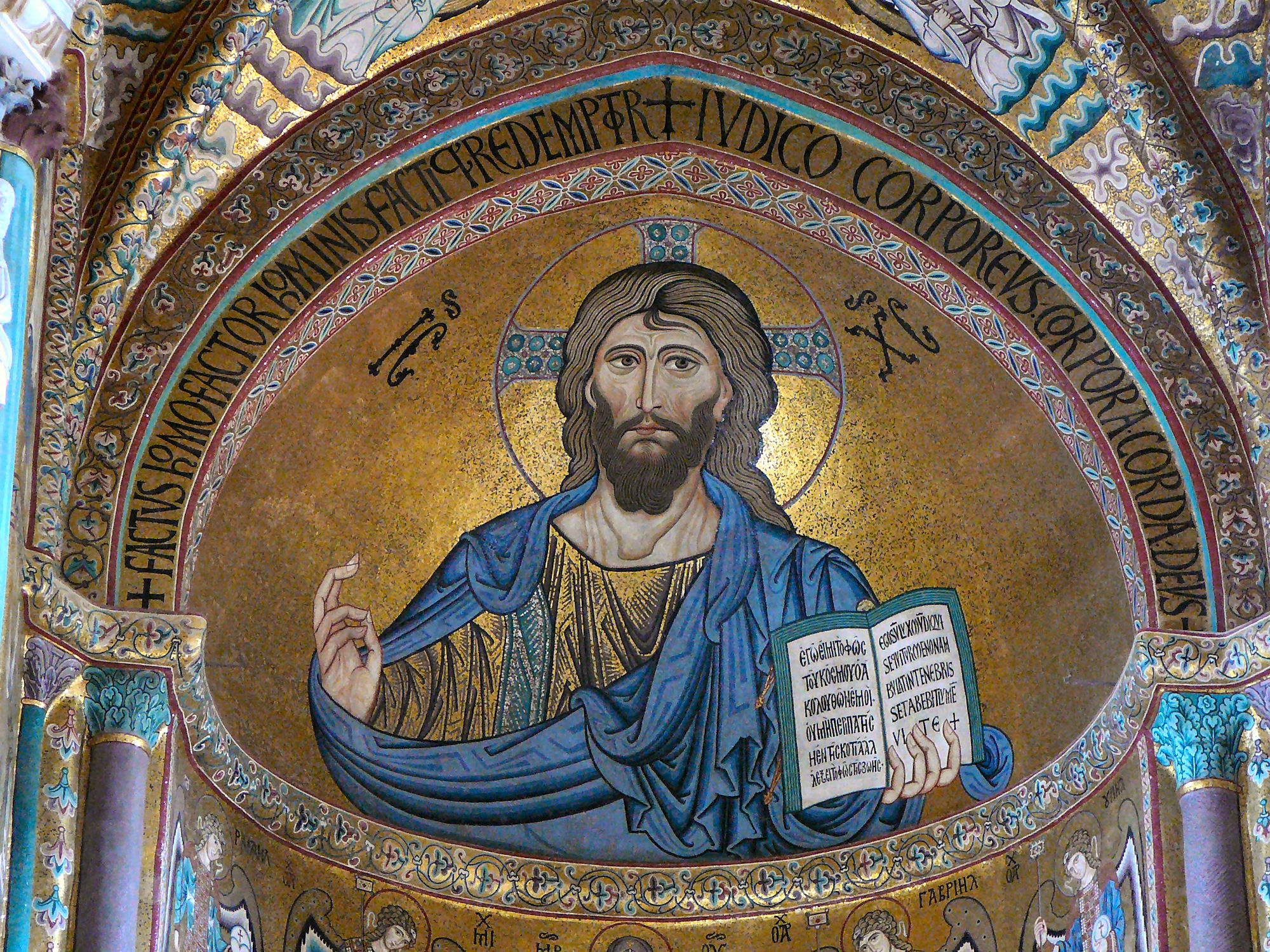
Byzantine–style mosaic of Christ Pantokrator in the Cefalù Cathedral, erected by Roger II in 1131

Seventy-three years after the Islamic invasion of Southern Italy, the Byzantine forces began a reconquest of Sicily under the Byzantine general George Maniakes in 1038. This invasion relied on a number of Norse mercenaries, the Varangians, including the future King of Norway Harald Hardrada, as well as on several contingents of Italo-Norman warriors. Although Maniakes' death in a Byzantine civil war in 1043 cut the invasion short, the Normans followed up on the advances made by the Byzantines and completed the conquest of the former Emirate of Sicily and North Africa.

The Normans had been expanding south, as mercenaries and adventurers, driven by the myth of a happy and sunny island in the Southern Seas. The Norman Robert Guiscard, son of Tancred, conquered several regions of southern Italy in 1060. The island of Sicily was split politically between three Arab emirs, and the sizable Byzantine Orthodox Christian population rebelled against the ruling Muslims. One year later Messina fell to troops under the leadership of Roger Bosso (the brother of Robert Guiscard and the future Count Roger I of Sicily), and in 1071 the Normans took Palermo. Muslim Arabs and Berbers held onto Sicily and other regions of southern Italy until they were eventually defeated and expelled by the Christian Normans in 1072 to their Iberian and North African territories. The loss of the cities, each with a splendid harbor, dealt a severe blow to Muslim power on the island. Eventually Normans took all of Sicily. In 1091, Noto in the southern tip of Sicily and the island of Malta, the last Arab strongholds, fell to the Christian forces as well.

== Norman conquest of Africa ==
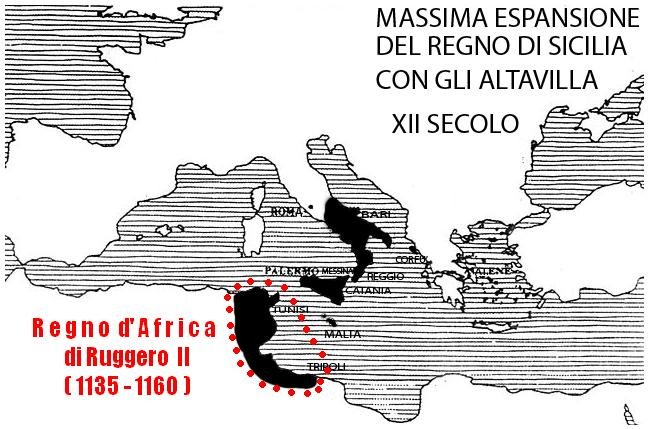
The Kingdom of Africa (in Italian: Regno d'Africa) pinpointed in red

The Kingdom of Africa was an extension of the frontier zone of the Siculo-Norman state in the former Roman province of Africa (Note: Before it was finally conquered by the Muslims, this province was reorganised as the Byzantine exarchate of Africa.) (Ifrīqiya in Tunisian Arabic), corresponding to Tunisia and parts of Algeria and Libya today. The main primary sources for the kingdom are Arabic (Muslim); the Latin (Christian) sources are scanter. According to Hubert Houben, since "Africa" was never mentioned in the royal title of the kings of Sicily, "one ought not to speak of a 'Norman kingdom of Africa'." Rather, "[Norman Africa] really amounted to a constellation of Norman-held towns along coastal Ifrīqiya."

The Sicilian conquest of Africa began under Roger II in 1146–48. Sicilian rule consisted of military garrisons in the major towns, exactions on the local Muslim population, protection of Christians and the minting of coin. The local aristocracy was largely left in place, and Muslim princes controlled the civil government under Sicilian oversight. Economic connections between Sicily and Africa, which were strong before the conquest, were strengthened, while ties between Africa and northern Italy were expanded. Early in the reign of William I, the "kingdom" of Africa fell to the Almohads (1158–60). Its most enduring legacy was the realignment of Mediterranean powers brought about by its demise and the Siculo-Almohad peace finalised in 1180.

== Cultural interactions ==
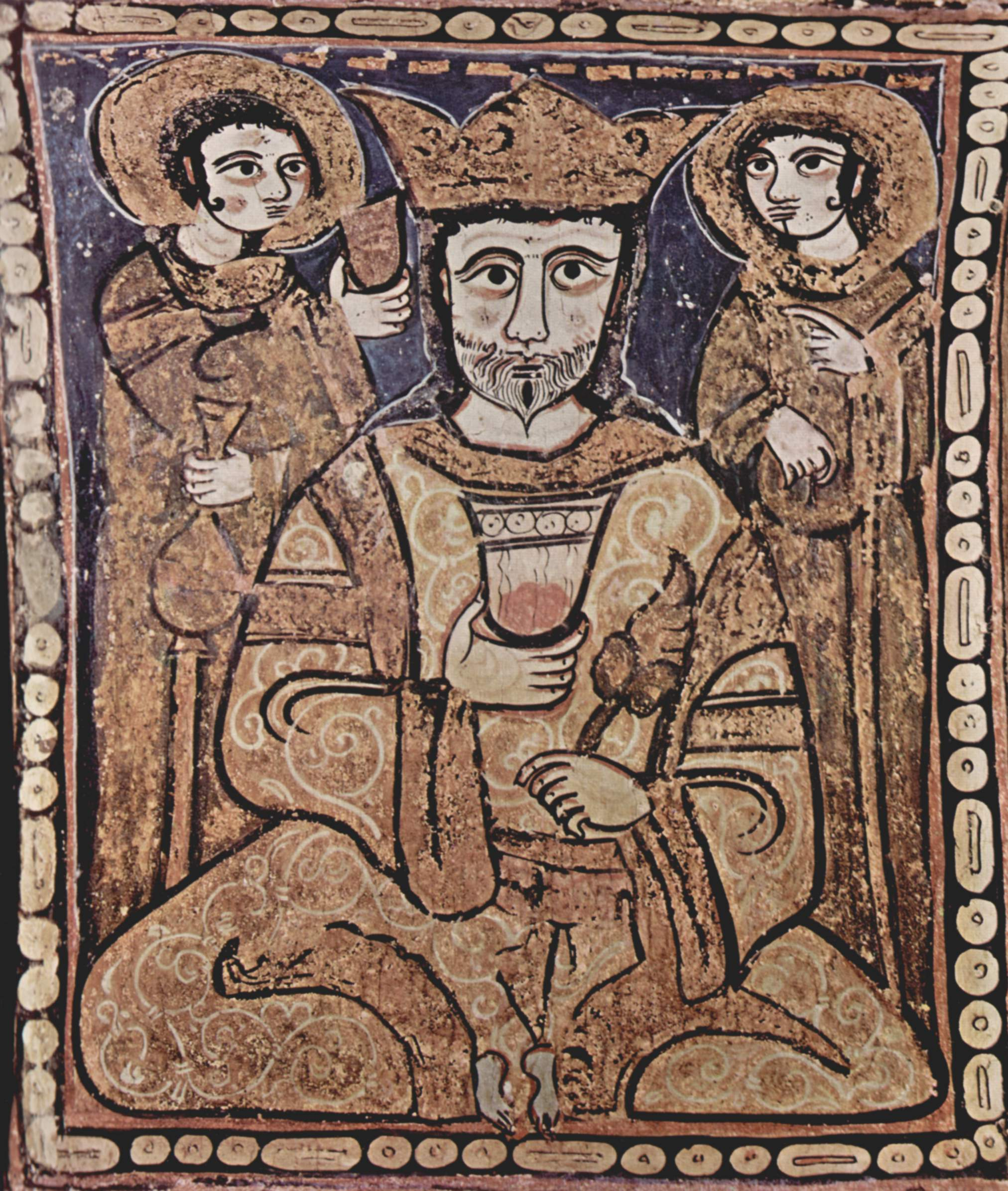
Arabic–style fresco in the Cappella Palatina, Palermo.

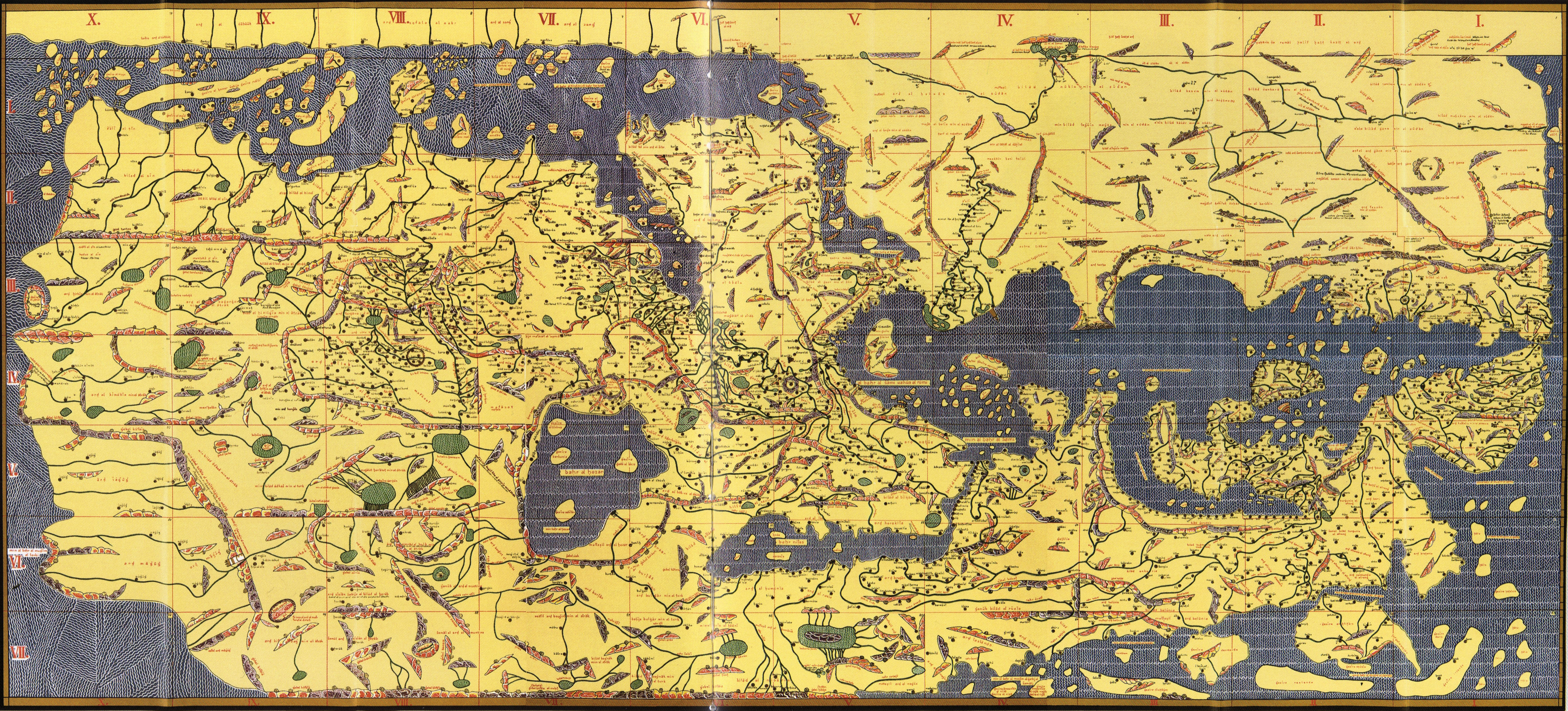
The Tabula Rogeriana, drawn by al-Idrisi for Roger II of Sicily in 1154, one of the most advanced ancient world maps. Note: North is to the bottom of the map.

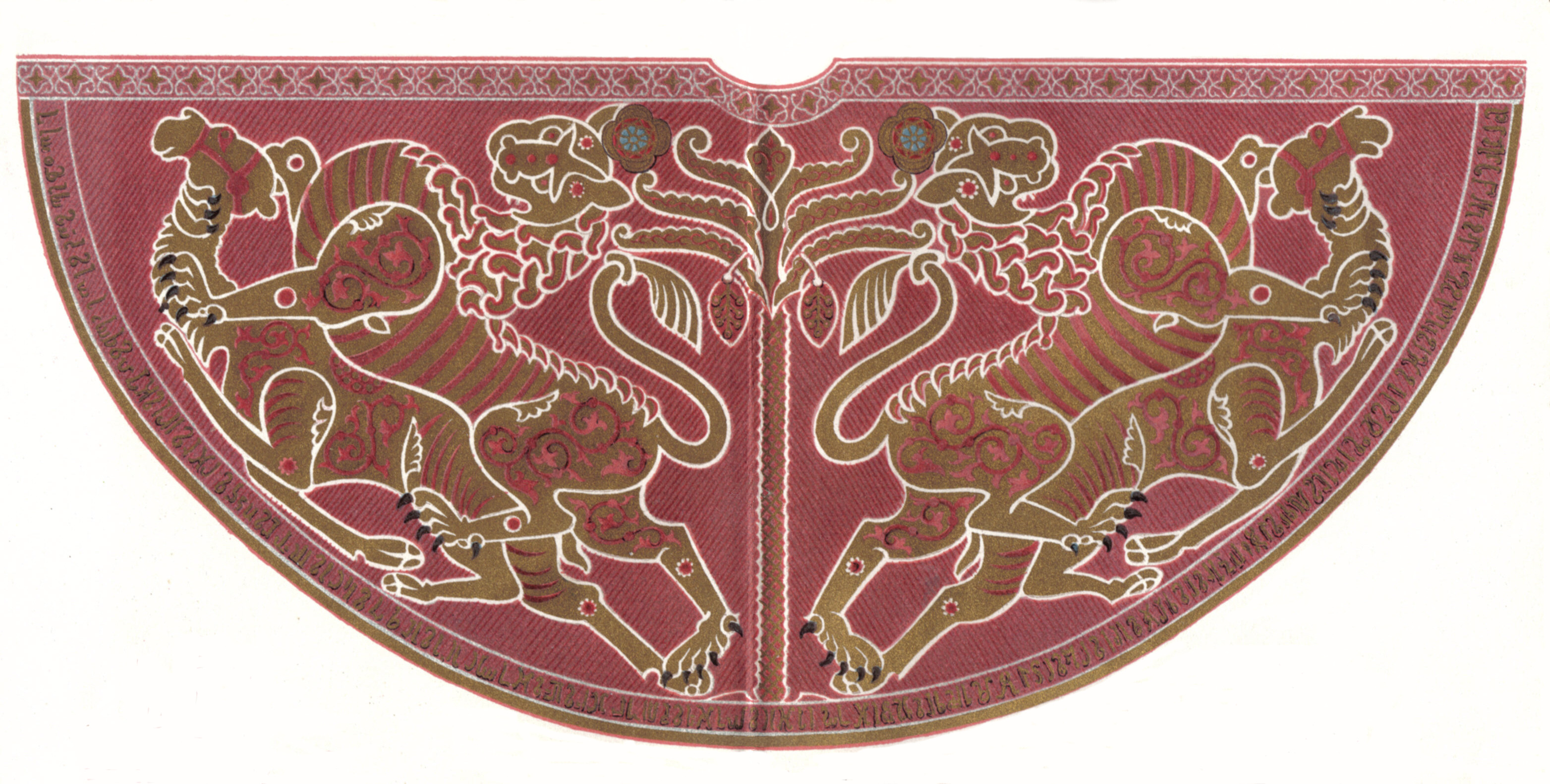
Coronation mantle of Roger II of Sicily. It bears an inscription in Arabic with the Hijri date of 528 (1133–1134).

Following the Norman conquest of southern Italy, an intense Norman–Arab–Byzantine culture developed in Sicily, exemplified by rulers such as Roger II of Sicily, who had Muslim soldiers, poets, and scientists at his court, and had Byzantine Greeks, Christodoulos, the famous George of Antioch, and finally Philip of Mahdia, serve successively as his ammiratus ammiratorum ("emir of emirs"). Roger II himself spoke Arabic and was fond of Arab culture. He used Arab and Byzantine Greek troops and siege engines in his campaigns in Southern Italy, and mobilized Arab and Byzantine architects to help his Normans build monuments in the Norman–Arab–Byzantine style. The various agricultural and industrial techniques which had been introduced by the Arabs in Sicily during the preceding two centuries were kept and further developed, allowing for the remarkable prosperity of the island. Numerous Classical Greek works, long lost to the Latin speaking West, were translated from Byzantine Greek manuscripts found in Sicily directly into Latin. For the following two hundred years, Sicily under Norman rule became a model which was widely admired throughout Europe and Arabia.

The English historian John Julius Norwich remarked of the Kingdom of Sicily:

Norman Sicily stood forth in Europe—and indeed in the whole bigoted medieval world—as an example of tolerance and enlightenment, a lesson in the respect that every man should feel for those whose blood and beliefs happen to differ from his own.

During Roger II's reign, the Kingdom of Sicily became increasingly characterized by its multi-ethnic composition and unusual religious tolerance. Catholic Normans, Langobards and native Sicilians, Muslim Arabs, and Orthodox Byzantine Greeks existed in a relative harmony for this time period, and Roger II was known to have planned for the establishment of an Empire that would have encompassed Fatimid Egypt and the Crusader states in the Levant up until his death in 1154. One of the greatest geographical treatises of the Middle Ages was written for Roger II by the Andalusian scholar Muhammad al-Idrisi, and entitled Kitab Rudjdjar ("The Book of Roger").

At the end of the 12th century, the population of Sicily is estimated to have been up to one-third Byzantine Greek speaking, with the remainder speaking Romance languages brought from mainland Italy (the Sicilian language, the Gallo-Italic of Sicily, and Old Norman), Siculo-Arabic, and Hebrew. Although the language of the court was the Old French dialect (Langue d'oïl) of Old Norman, all royal edicts were written in the language of the people they were addressed to: Latin, Byzantine Greek, Arabic, and Hebrew. Roger's royal mantel, used for his coronation (and also used for the coronation of Frederick II), bore an inscription in Arabic with the Hijri date of 528 (1133–1134).

Islamic authors marvelled at the forbearance of the Norman kings:

They [the Muslims] were treated kindly, and they were protected, even against the Franks. Because of that, they had great love for king Roger.
Ibn al-Athir

Interactions continued with the succeeding Norman kings, for example under William II of Sicily, as attested by the Spanish–Arab geographer Ibn Jubair who landed in the island after returning from a pilgrimage to Mecca in 1184. To his surprise, Ibn Jubair enjoyed a very warm reception by the Norman Christians. He was further surprised to find that even some Christians spoke Arabic and that several government officials were Muslim:

The attitude of the king is really extraordinary. His attitude towards the Muslims is perfect: he gives them employment, he chooses his officers among them, and all, or almost all, keep their faith secret and can remain faithful to the faith of Islam. The king has full confidence in the Muslims and relies on them to handle many of his affairs, including the most important ones, to the point that the Great Intendant for cooking is a Muslim (...) His viziers and chamberlains are eunuchs, of which there are many, who are the members of his government and on whom he relies for his private affairs.
Ibn Jubair, Rihla.

Ibn Jubair mentioned that some Christians in Palermo wore the Muslim dress and spoke Arabic. The Norman kings continued to strike coins in Arabic with Hijrah dates. The registers at the Royal court were written in Arabic. At one point, William II of Sicily is recorded to have said: "Every one of you should invoke the one he adores and of whom he follows the faith".

=== Norman–Arab–Byzantine art ===
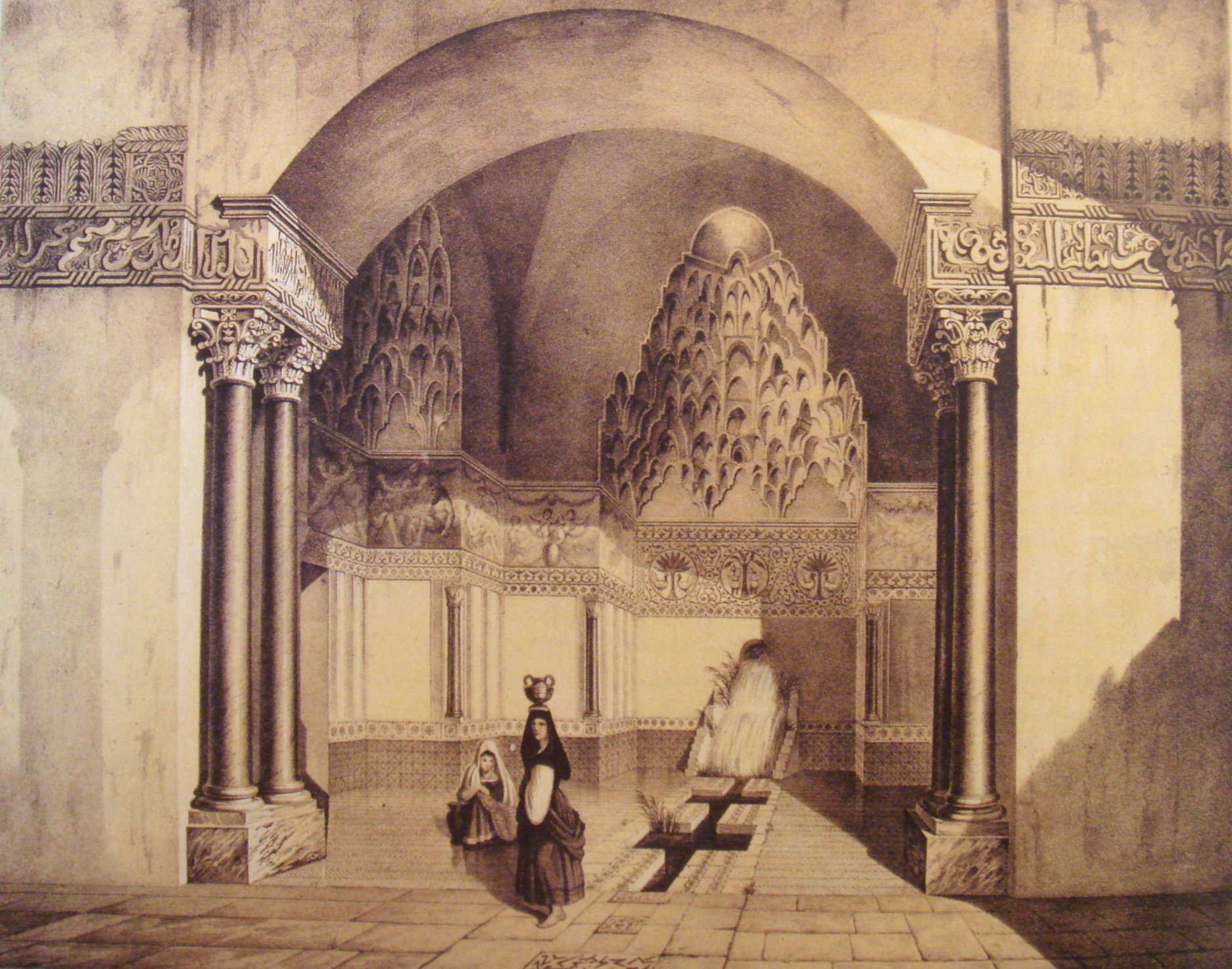
Norman–Arab–Byzantine art and architecture combined Occidental features (such as the Classical pillars and friezes) with typical Arabic decorations and calligraphy, following the Norman conquest of the former Emirate of Sicily and North Africa.

Numerous artistic techniques from the Byzantine and Islamic world were also incorporated to form the basis of Arab-Norman art: inlays in mosaics or metals, sculpture of ivory or porphyry, sculpture of hard stones, bronze foundries, manufacture of silk (for which Roger II established a regium ergasterium, a state enterprise which would give Sicily the monopoly of silk manufacture for all Western Europe). During a raid on the Byzantine Empire, Roger II's admiral George of Antioch had transported the silk weavers from Thebes, Greece, where they had formed a part of the, until then, closely guarded monopoly that was the Byzantine silk industry.

The Norman kings were well known as supportive patrons of the arts. An example of this could be seen by the construction of a tiraz by certain Sicilian rulers, which were silk workshops typically seen in Islamic regimes, particularly in Egypt. Roger II was one such prominent patron of the arts, with the most well-known image of him in Sicily being found at the Church of Santa Maria dell’Ammiraglio. The cultural fusion of Roger's kingdom is on display in this image, as seen by his donning of a ceremonial costume typical of Byzantine emperors and the placement of a Byzantine crown on his head.

=== Norman–Arab–Byzantine architecture ===
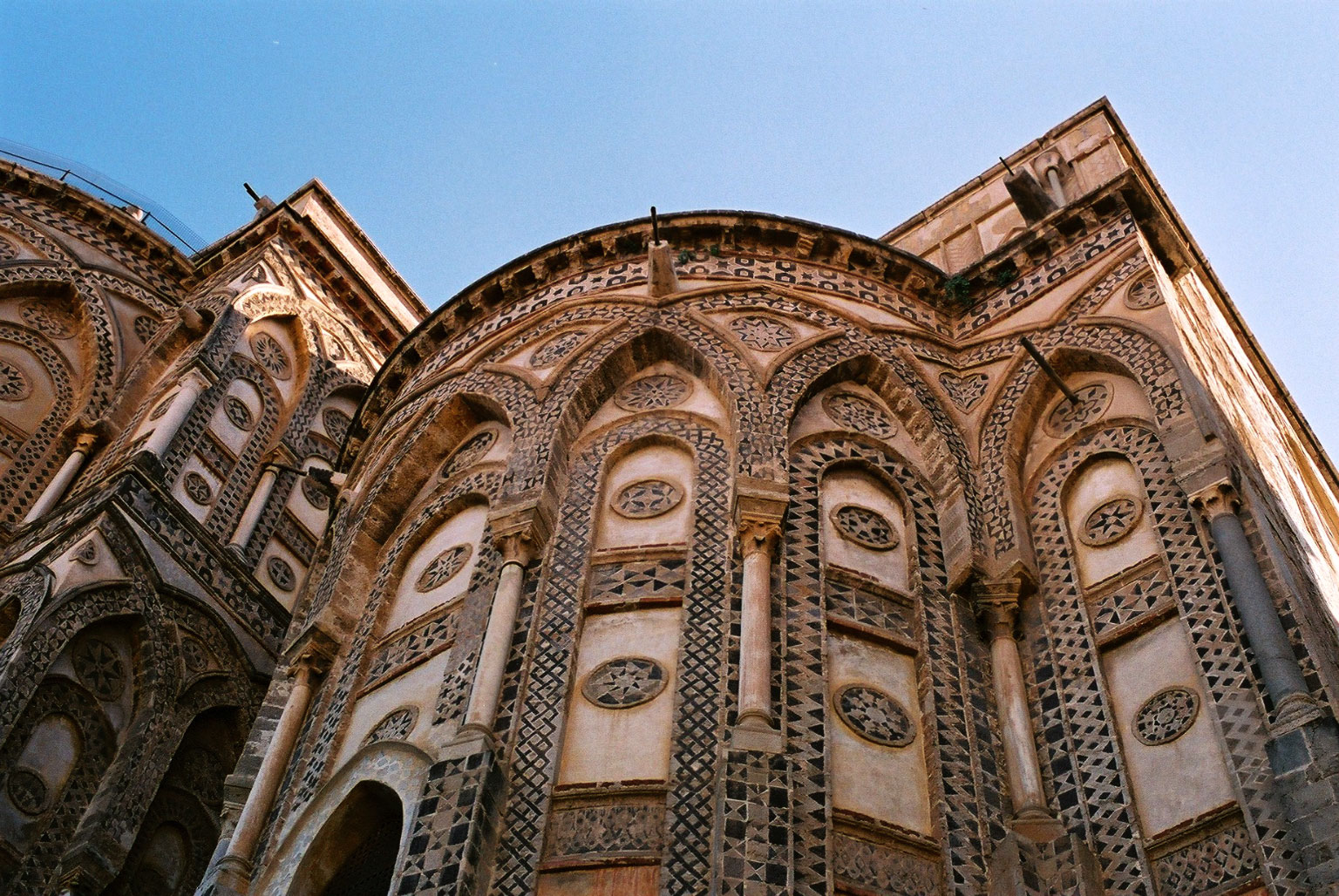
The outsides of the principal doorways and their pointed arches of Monreale Cathedral are magnificently enriched with carving and colored inlay, a curious combination of three styles—Norman–French, Byzantine, and Arab.

The new Norman rulers started to build various constructions in what is called the Arab-Norman style. They incorporated elements of Arab and Byzantine architecture, such as domes and pointed arches, into their own art. They also used brick, unlike in Normandy and England.

The first Norman cathedral in Sicily was that of Catania, completed in 1093. Only the hulking, fortified-looking east end has survived later destruction and rebuilding.

The Church of Saint-John of the Hermits, was built in Palermo by Roger II around 1143–1148 in such a style. The church is notable for its brilliant red domes, which show clearly the persistence of Arab influences in Sicily at the time of its reconstruction in the 12th century. In her Diary of an Idle Woman in Sicily, Frances Elliot described it as "... totally oriental... it would fit well in Baghdad or Damascus". The bell tower, with four orders of arcaded loggias, is instead a typical example of Gothic architecture.

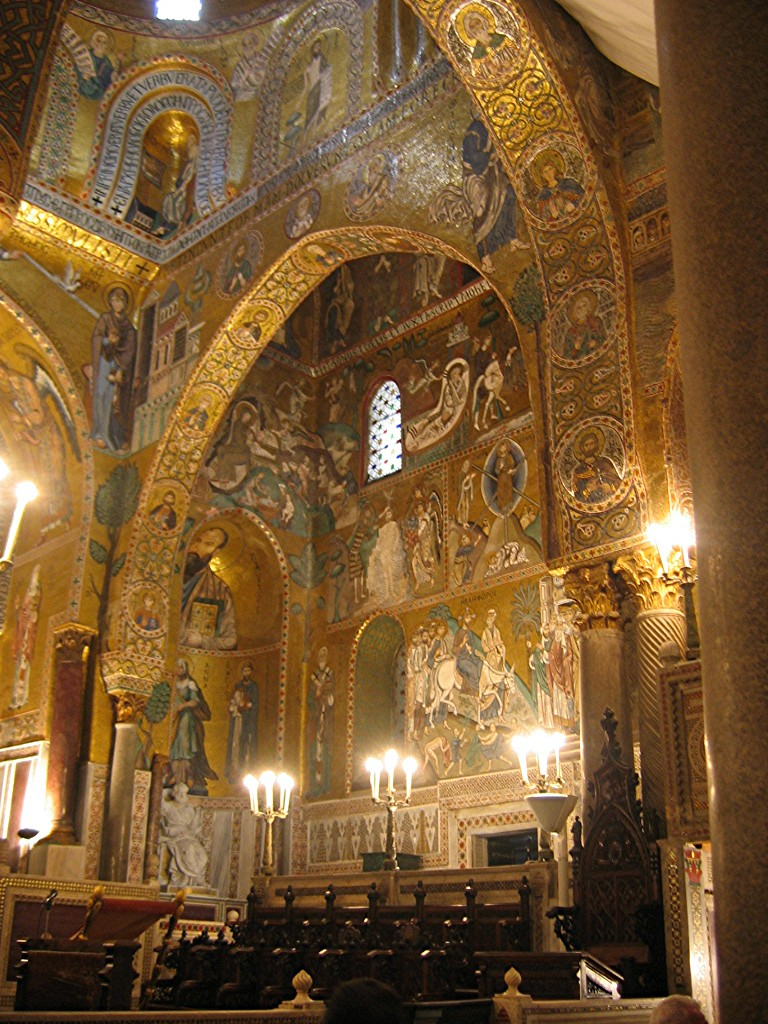
"The Cappella Palatina, at Palermo, the most wonderful of Roger's churches, with Norman doors, Saracenic arches, Byzantine dome, and roof adorned with Arabic scripts, is perhaps the most striking product of the brilliant and mixed civilization over which the grandson of the Norman Trancred ruled." (EB1911)

The Cappella Palatina (1132-40), also in Palermo, combines harmoniously a variety of styles: the Norman architecture and door decor, the Arabic arches and scripts adorning the roof, the Byzantine dome and mosaics. For instance, clusters of four eight-pointed stars, typical for Muslim design, are arranged on the ceiling so as to form a Christian cross.

Cefalù Cathedral (begun 1131) shows the difference between Norman-Arab-Byzantine architecture and Romanesque architecture in the rest of Europe, as it has completely flat walls above the arcades, in the manner of an early Christian basilica or Islamic mosque, whereas a true Romanesque church would be modelled in three dimensions. The cathedral of Monreale has a similar internal elevation. The outsides of the principal doorways at Monreale and their pointed arches are enriched with carving and coloured inlay, a curious combination of three styles—Norman–French, Byzantine and Arab. The cathedral was decorated by Byzantine masters, with over 6300sqm of mosaics.

Roger II's royal palace is a tremendous example of the multiple cultural influences on architecture. It features Byzantine Mosaics made in Constantinople and honeycombed ceilings typical of Muslim architecture at the time. Byzantine mosaicists also played an important part in the design of the Cefalù Chapel. The Palace also consisted of two towers in its initial design, one of which was referred to as the “Greek Tower” due to its having been designed by Greek architects.

The Santa Maria dell'Ammiraglio built in 1143 by Roger II's "emir of emirs" George of Antioch was originally consecrated as a Greek Orthodox church, according to its Greek–Arab bilingual foundation charter, and was built in the Byzantine Greek cross style with some Arab influences. Another unusual church from this period is the country church of Santi Pietro e Paolo d'Agrò in Casalvecchio Siculo; it has been described "one of the most sophisticated and coherent works of architecture to emerge from the Norman rule of the island".

As well as churches, the Normans erected castles to cement their rule across Sicily, Malta and the Mezzogiorno, though many have since been destroyed and rebuilt.

This style of construction persisted until the 14th and the 15th century, exemplified by the use of the cupola.

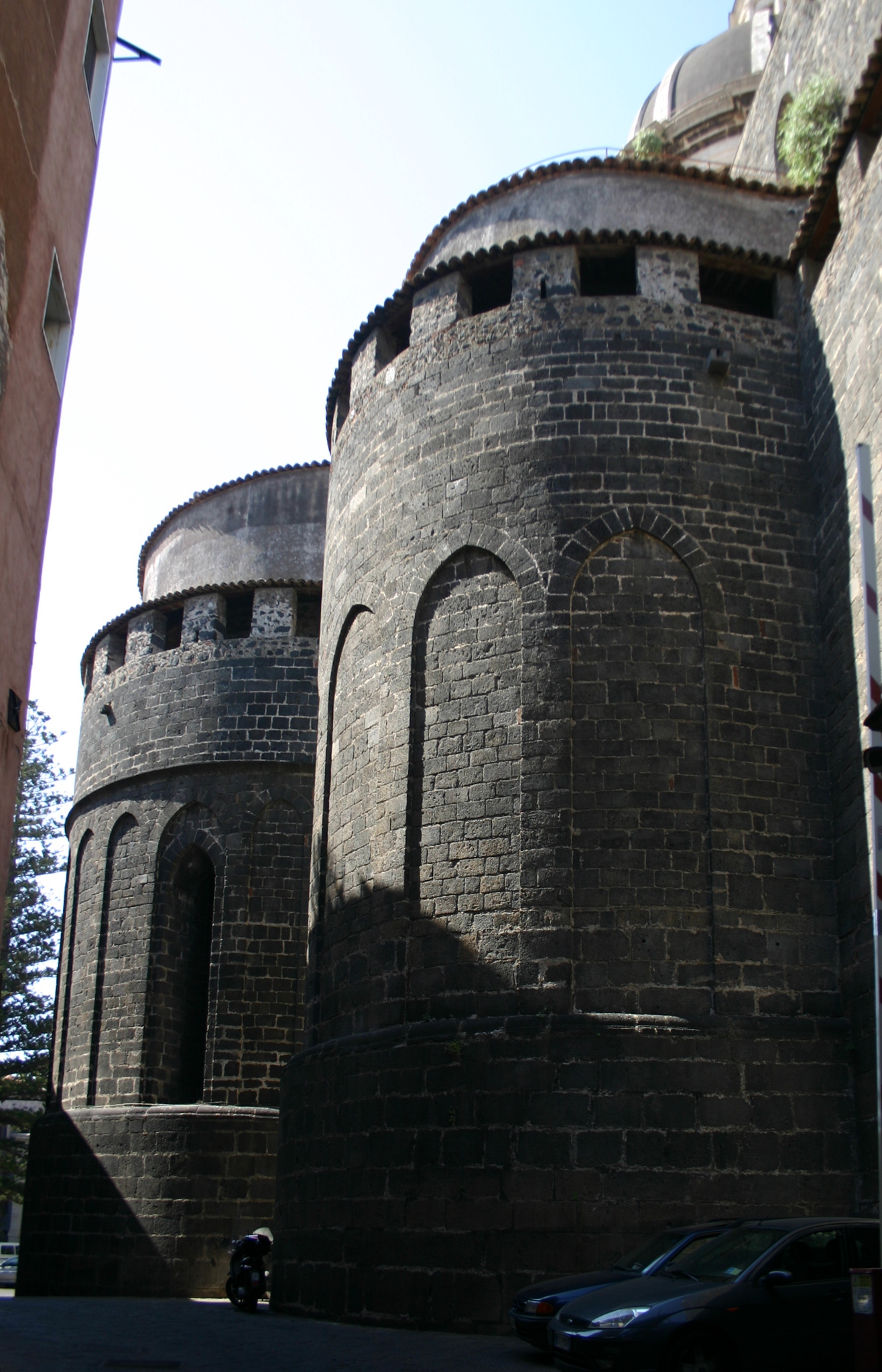
The apses of Catania Cathedral

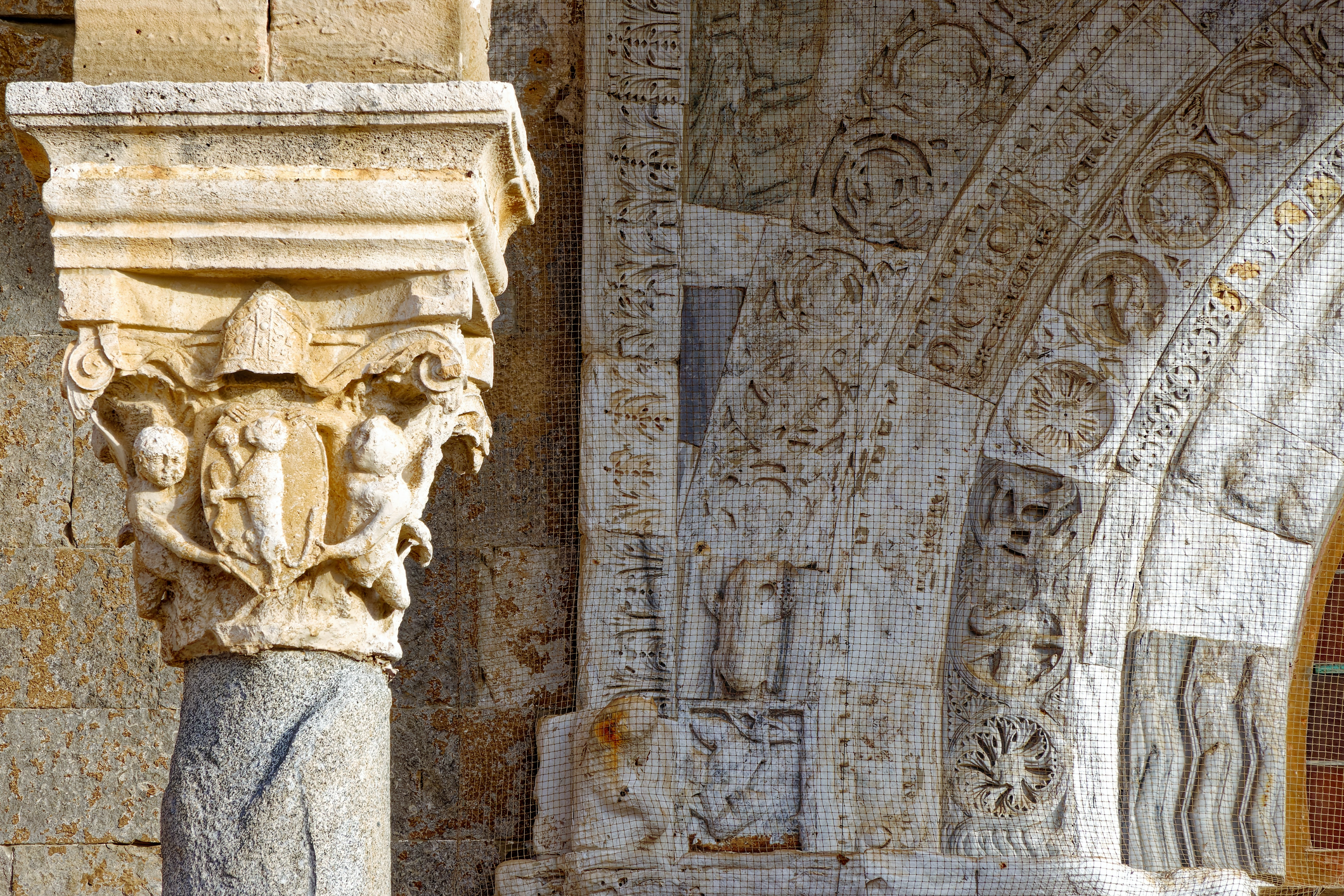
Carved details in Cefalù Cathedral

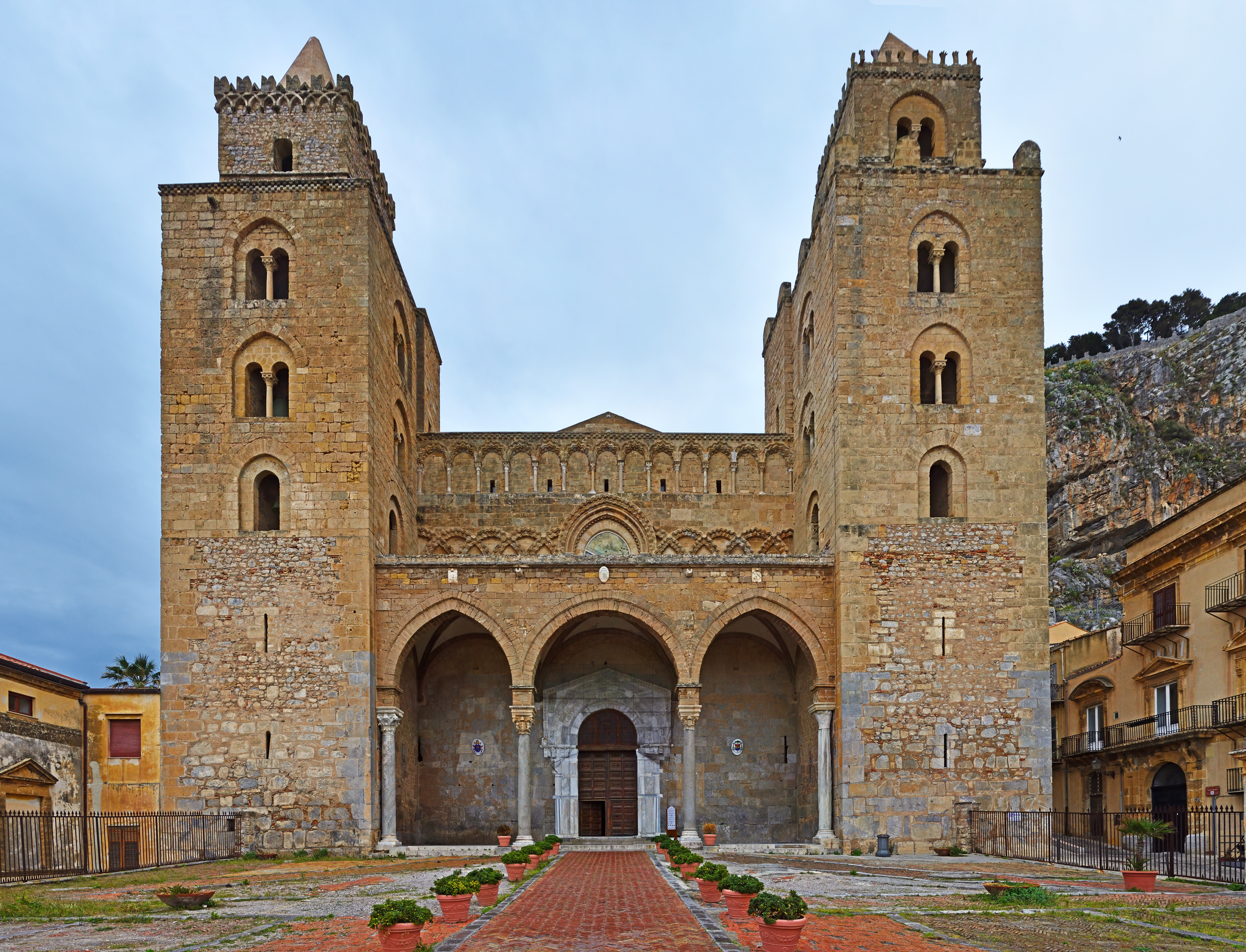
The façade of Cefalù Cathedral

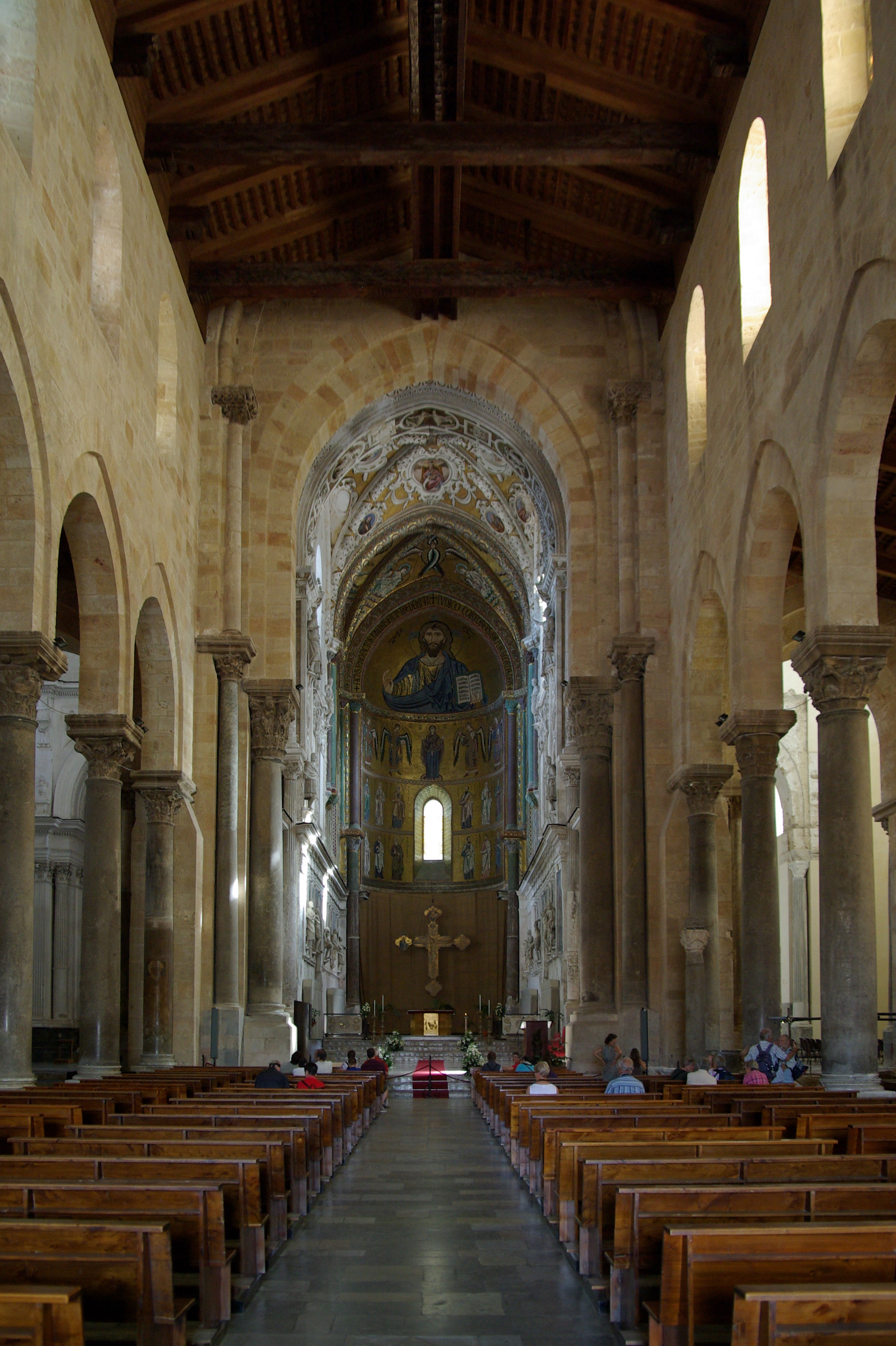
The nave of Cefalù Cathedral

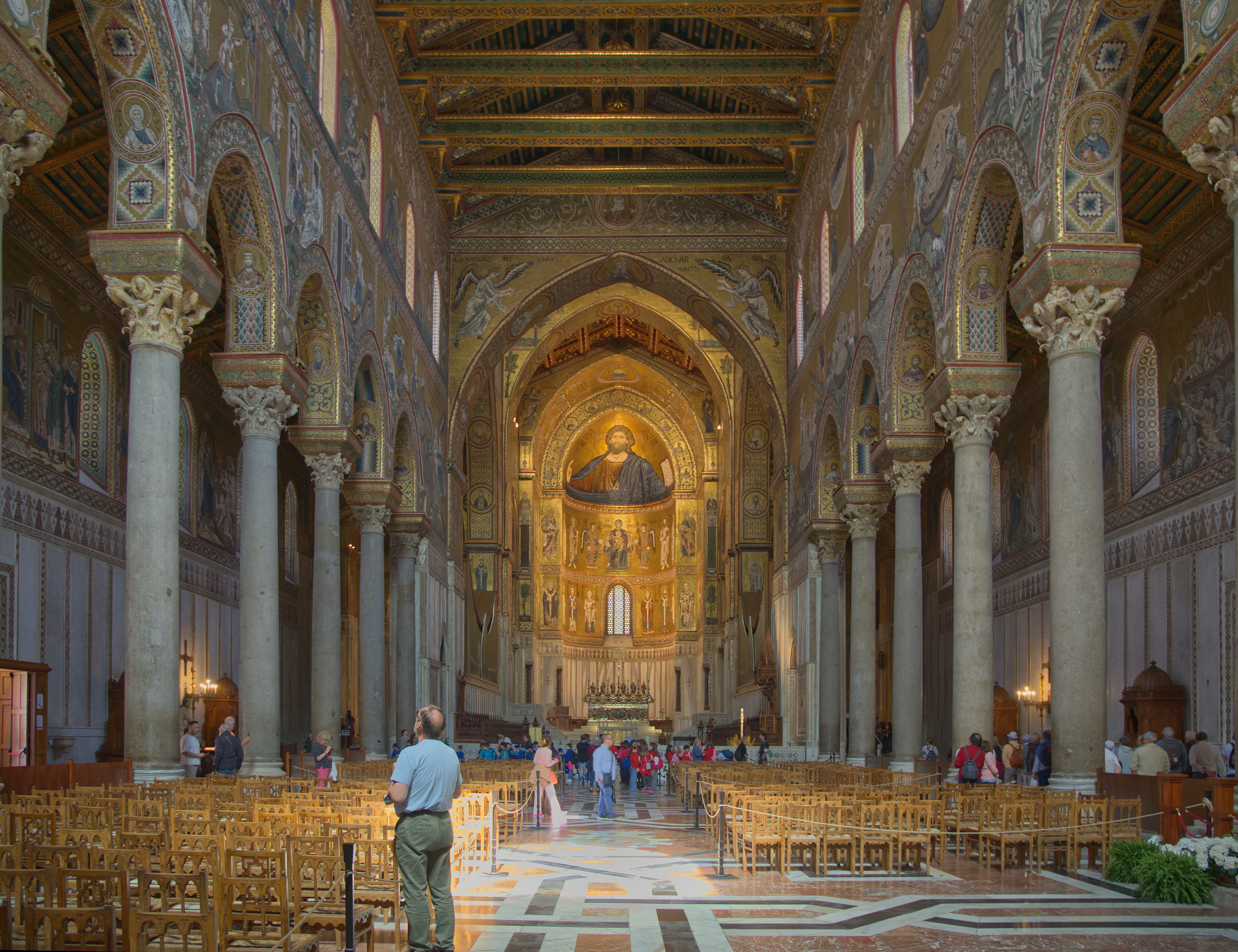
The nave of Monreale Cathedral

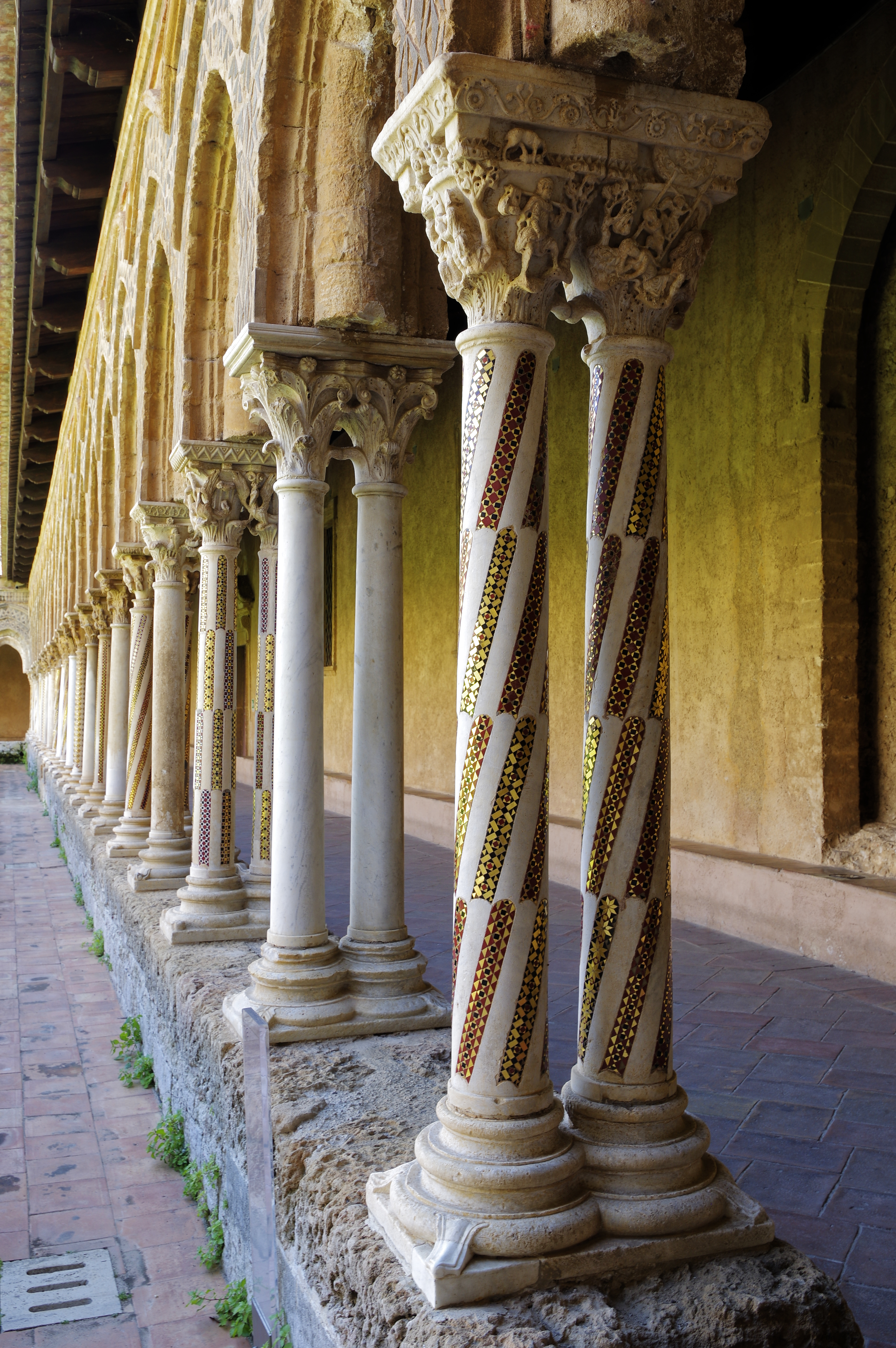
Inlaid mosaic columns in the cloister of Monreale Cathedral

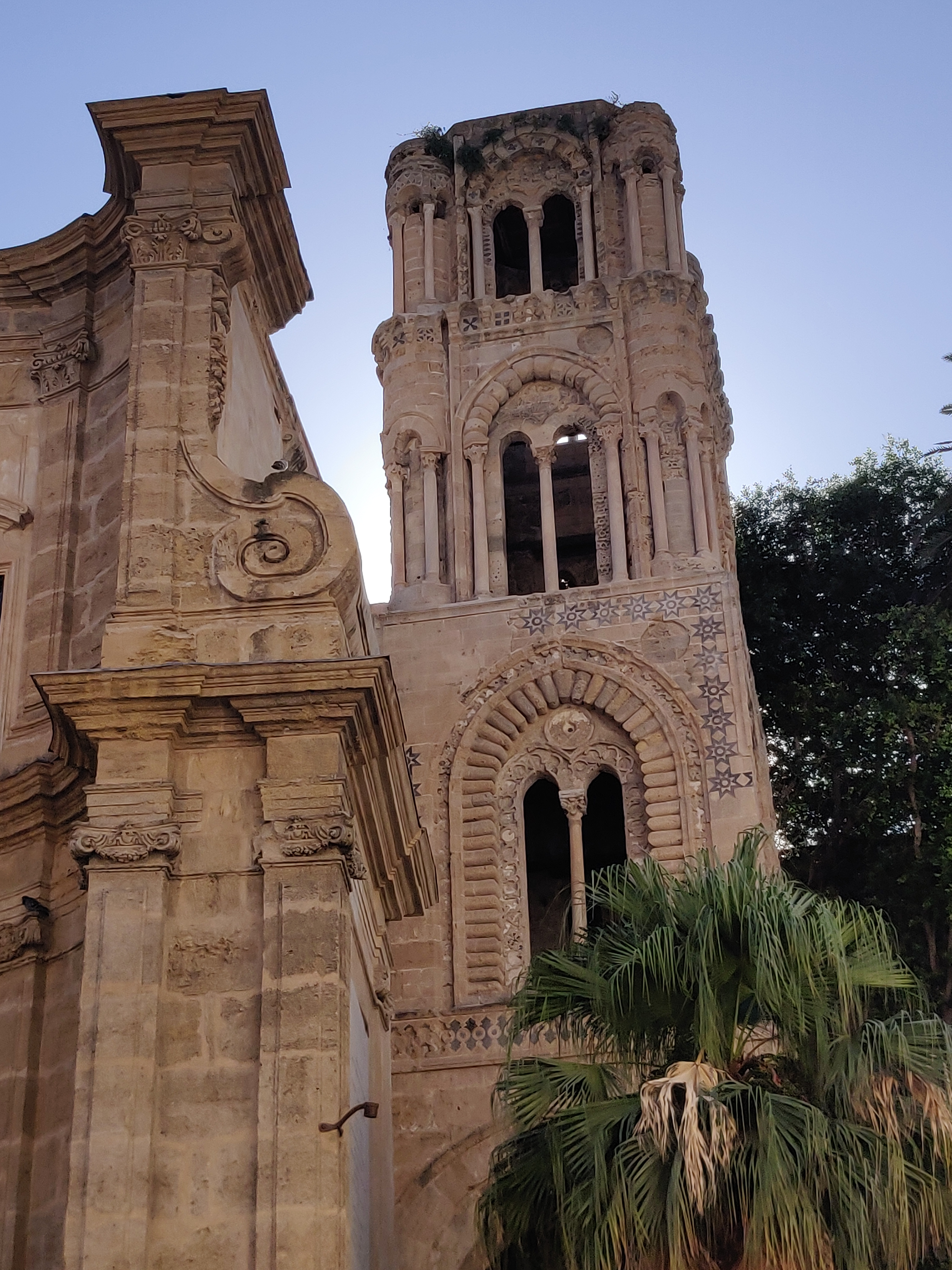
The belfry of the Chiesa della Martorana, Palermo

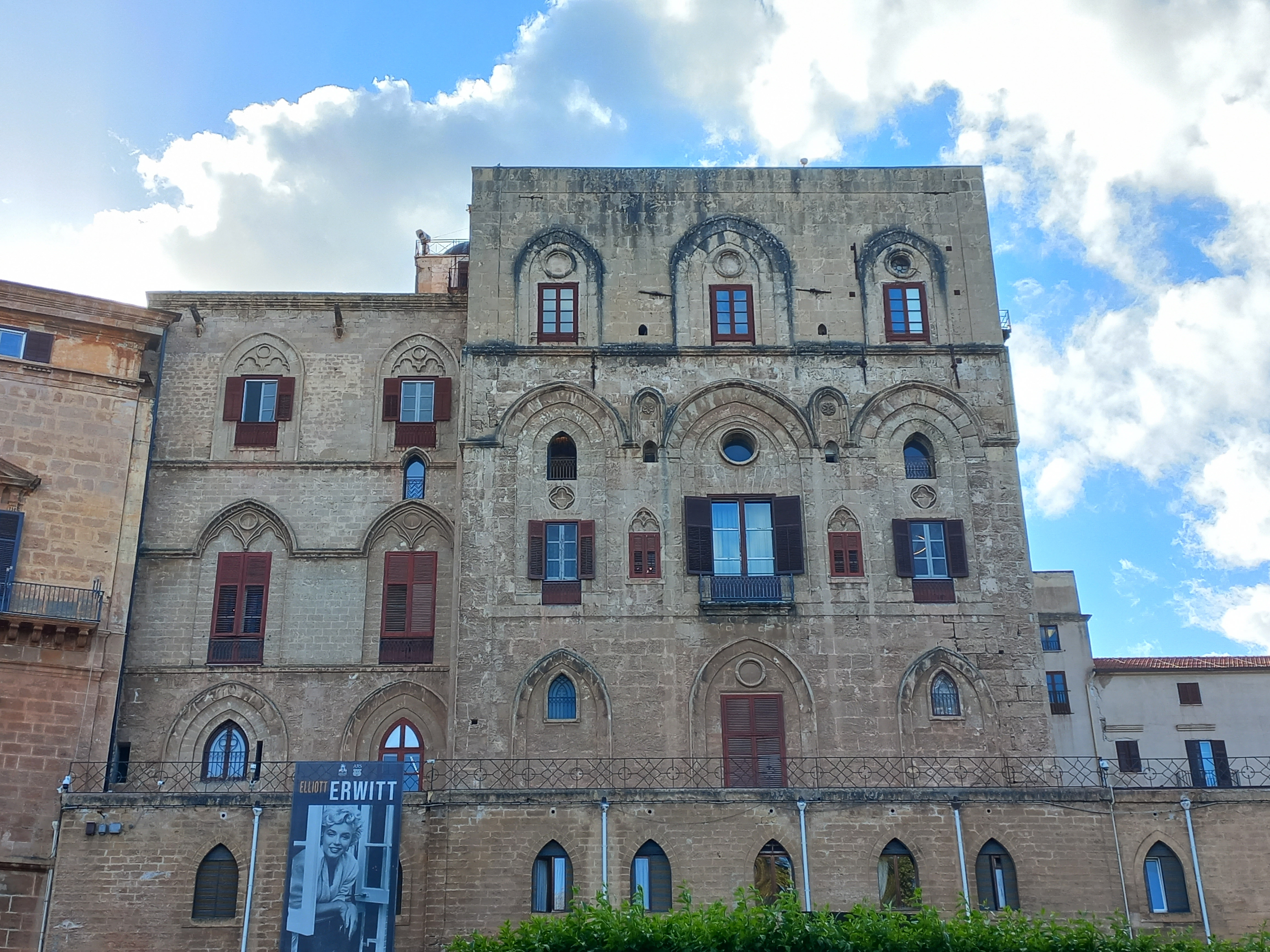
The Palazzo dei Normanni, Palermo

=== Norman–Arab–Byzantine scholarship ===
The translation of scholarly texts from Greek and Arabic into Latin was common in Sicily, especially in Palermo. Henricus Aristippus would play a major part in one of the most famous translations to take place in Palermo. Serving as the chief advisor to William I, Aristippus would be the one to bring Ptolemy's pivotal work the Almagest to Sicily from Constantinople after being gifted the text by Emperor Manuel Comnenos. The text would then be translated from Greek to Latin by an unknown figure. This was typical of William's court, which was known as being a center of Greek studies in both philosophy and natural sciences. Al-Idrisi was the most famous Muslim scholar in Norman Sicily, as already mentioned for his geographical work under Roger II. He would continue his work under William I, who sponsored him to create a new edition of his Geography, write a book on medicinal plants, and to craft several works of poetry. Beyond al-Idrisi, the Greek theologian Neilos Doxopatres would enjoy the patronage of Roger at his court.

== Key figures ==
=== Roger II ===
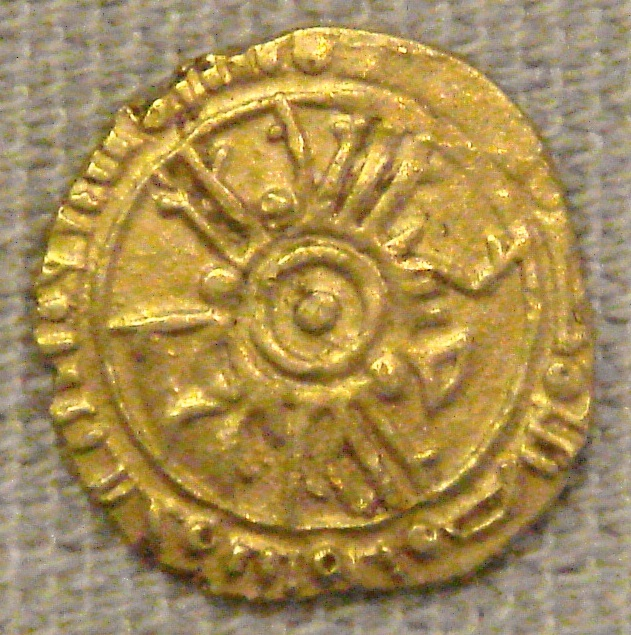
Tarì gold coin of Roger II of Sicily, with Arabic inscriptions, minted in Palermo (British Museum)

Roger II was a prominent symbol of the cultural interaction in Norman Sicily. He was known to be knowledgeable in Greek, Arabic, and Latin. This knowledge showed itself in Roger's documents, with an estimated 75-80% of his royal charters being written in Greek. The Byzantine influence on Roger was clear from early on in his life, with his formative years spent in Messina on Sicily's heavily Greek Eastern coast. He was tutored by Greeks and his use of Fabian warfare tactics and his interest in administration and finance are all interpreted as signs of the Byzantine influence on the ruler. He also described himself as a Basileus rather than the Latin Rex.

This is not to dismiss the influence of Arabic culture on Roger II. He often referenced himself both as a "defender of Christianity" and as "powerful through the grace of Allah." He was also known to sit in state underneath a bejeweled parasol gifted to him by the Fatimid Caliph. In fact, Roger's love for Arabic culture was so pronounced that Ibn al-Athir would go so far as to point out a rumor that the king was actually a Muslim when writing about him.

=== William II ===
Roger II was not the only Norman king of Sicily to exhibit the influence that other cultures had on the island. William II was known to demonstrate numerous marks of Arabic culture, as documented by Ibn Jubayr. Among the things that caused William to II to "resemble Muslim kings" to Jubayr were his immersion in luxury, the nature of his laws, his displays of finery, his ability to read and write in Arabic, and his keeping of Muslim slave girls and concubines at his royal palace. William's royal seal also bore the written phrase "Praise to Allah." The king's trust of Muslims was also well known, with Ibn Jubayr observing that William's chief cook was Muslim and that he was guarded by a force of black Muslim slaves.

=== Christodoulos ===
Christodoulos would prove to be one of the most powerful non-Norman figures in the history of Norman Sicily. He was a Greek Orthodox from Calabria, who began his service to Roger I in the 1090s. However, the peak of his power and influence would come under the regency of Adelaide del Vasto. He would be given the title of amiralius in 1109 after having previously acted under the title of amiratus. Under this new title he would command the formidable Norman fleet and act as the de facto ruler of Sicily until Roger II came to power. He also served as a tutor to Roger II in his youth.

=== George of Antioch ===
Under the rule of Roger II, George of Antioch would emerge as a significant figure. He was educated in Antioch and “elsewhere in the Byzantine East.” He was known to be well-versed in Greek and Arabic language, literature, and financial administration.

=== Eugenius ===
Emir Eugenius acted as a prominent Greek bureaucrat in Norman Sicily. Much like other prominent non-Norman figures on the island during Norman occupation, Eugenius had the ability to speak Greek, Arabic, and Latin. He served under several Sicilian monarchs, with his promotion to emir coming under Tancred in 1190. He is well known for translating Ptolemy's Optica from Arabic to Latin.

== Transmission to Europe ==
The points of contact between Europe and Islamic lands were multiple during the Middle Ages, with Sicily playing a key role in the transmission of knowledge to Europe, although less important than that of Spain. The main points of transmission of Islamic knowledge to Europe were in Sicily, and in Islamic Spain, particularly in Toledo (with Gerard of Cremone, 1114–1187, following the conquest of the city by the Spanish Christians in 1085). Many exchanges also occurred in the Levant due to the presence of the Crusaders there.

The early 1100s proved a pivotal point for the transmission of culture and goods from Islamic lands to Norman Sicily and other regions. The Fatimid port city of Alexandria had emerged as the most prominent hub of Mediterranean trade, and the commerce between Sicily, Ifriqiya, and Egypt was large in scale. This relationship was further reinforced by the reliance of North Africa's population upon Sicilian wheat after being hit by a severe famine in the late 11th-century. Norman inhabitants of Sicily would also play a role in imitating Arabic culture and spreading it beyond Muslim-held lands, an example of which could be seen in the wearing of Muslim garb by Christian women and their use of Arabic, as described by Ibn Jubayr. Roger II would also play a pivotal role in bringing Muslim governing practices to Europe, with his requesting of secretaries from the Fatimid Caliphate to come to Sicily in order to introduce Fatimid administrating and chancery culture to the Norman court.

== Aftermath ==
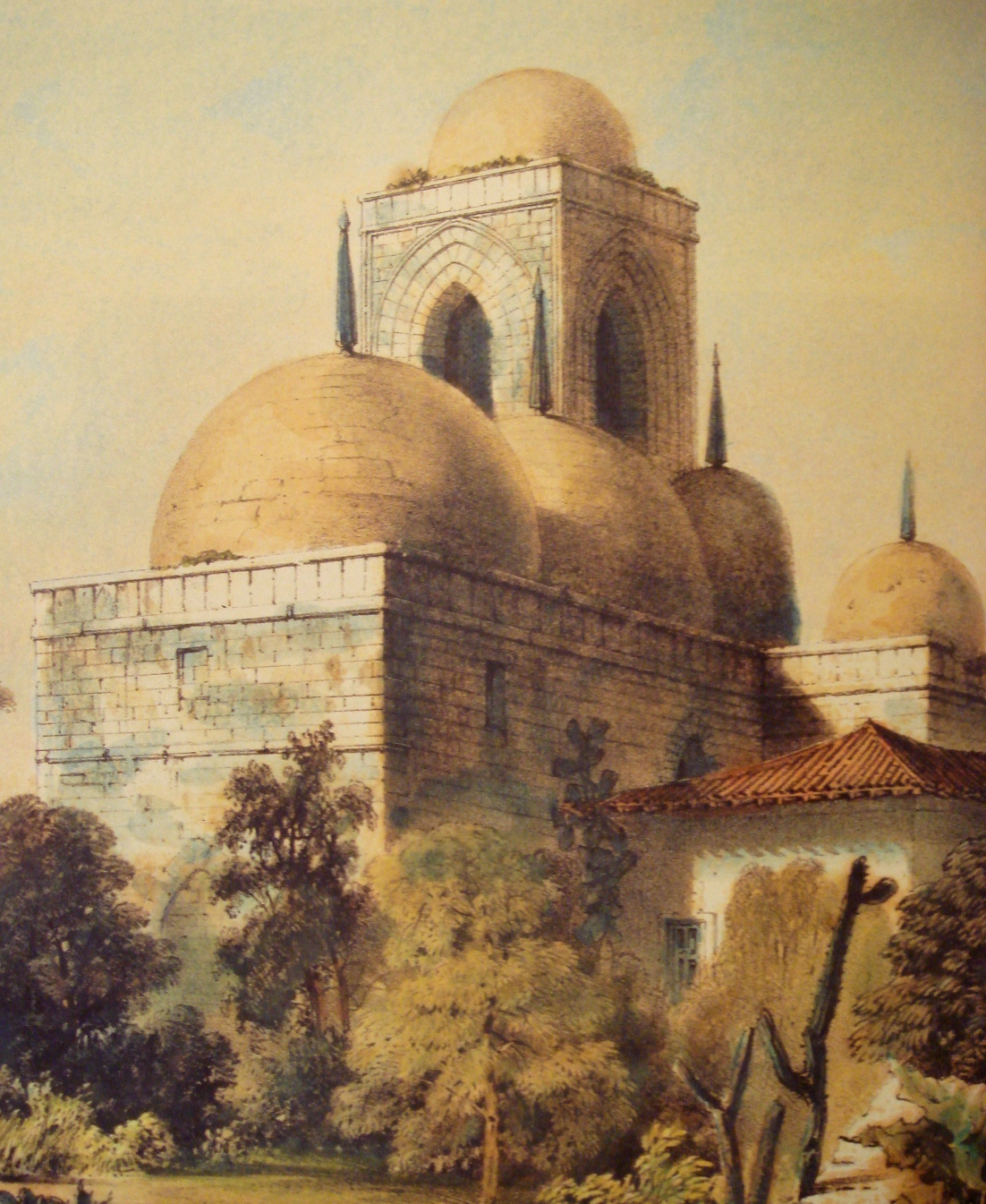
An example of Norman–Arab–Byzantine architecture, combining Gothic walls with Byzantine domes: Saint-John of the Hermits built in Palermo by Roger II around 1143–1148 (1840 lithography).

Arabic and Greek art and science continued to be influential in Sicily during the two centuries following the Norman conquest. Norman rule formally ended in 1198 with the reign of Constance of Sicily, and was replaced by that of the Swabian Hohenstaufen Dynasty.

In 1224, however, Frederick II, responding to religious uprisings in Sicily, expelled all Muslims from the island and transferred many to Lucera over the next two decades. In the controlled environment, they could not challenge royal authority and benefited the crown in taxes and military service. Their numbers eventually reached between 15,000 and 20,000, leading Lucera to be called Lucaera Saracenorum because it represented the last stronghold of Islamic presence in Italy. The colony thrived for 75 years until it was sacked in 1300 by Christian forces under the command of Charles II of Naples. The city's Muslim inhabitants were exiled or sold into slavery, with many finding asylum in Albania across the Adriatic Sea. Their abandoned mosques were destroyed or converted, and churches arose upon the ruins, including the cathedral S. Maria della Vittoria.

Even under Manfred (d. 1266) Islamic influence in Sicily persisted, but it had almost disappeared by the beginning of the 14th century. Latin progressively replaced Arabic and Greek, the last Sicilian document in Arabic being dated to 1245.

== See also ==
- Norman conquest of southern Italy
- Norman architecture
- Islam in Italy
- Italo-Norman
- History of Islam in southern Italy
- Byzantine mosaics
- Emirate of Sicily
- Hedwig glass
- Charlemagne chessmen
