= Admiral (Netherlands) =

Theoretical rank in the Royal Netherlands Navy

Admiral Admiraal
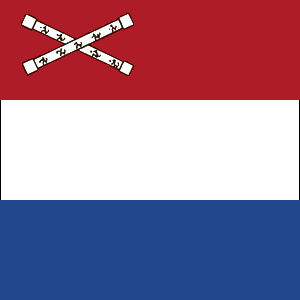
- Command flag

- Sleeve insignia
- Country: Netherlands
- Service branch: Royal Netherlands Navy
- Rank group: Flag officer
- Rank: Five-star
- NATO rank code: OF-10
- Abolished: 1956
- Next higher rank: None
- Next lower rank: Luitenant-admiraal

Admiral (Dutch: Admiraal) is theoretically the highest possible military rank in the Royal Netherlands Navy, although no longer awarded. The admiral carries marshal bars as a distinguishing mark above the gold gallon and is therefore equivalent to the five-star rank of Field Marshal or Admiral of the Fleet in other navies like the Royal Navy.

The rank of admiral is still described in the military flag protocols of the Dutch navy. However, the rank is no longer mentioned in the Government gazette of the Netherlands describing the ranks for army, naval and air force officers (Royal Decree of 20 June 1956 no. 35, Gazette no. 361), and also no longer appears in the Standardization Agreements of NATO (STANAG 2116).

Nowadays, the rank of Lieutenant Admiral is in practice the de facto highest rank in the Dutch navy and armed forces (conferred to a naval officer who is the Chief of Defence of the Netherlands Armed Forces).

== History ==
The rank can be held by either a naval officer appointed by the Council of Ministers of the Netherlands or a member of the Dutch royal family. The royal connection to the rank of admiral possibly originated in 1830, when King William I promoted his son Prince Frederick (who was already the Secretary of State for War and Navy) to the rank of admiral and commander-in-chief of the armed forces. The next and till today last person promoted to the rank of admiral was Prince Hendrik, the youngest brother of King William III, who made his brother admiral in 1879 to honor him for his long and exceptional career in the navy.

The seniority of all Netherlands admiral ranks is as follows:

1. Admiraal (Admiral)
2. Luitenant-admiraal (Lieutenant Admiral)
3. Vice-admiraal (Vice Admiral)
4. Schout-bij-nacht (Rear Admiral)
5. Commandeur (Commodore)

== List of Admiraals ==
- Prince Frederick: 1830
- Prince Hendrik: 1879
