= Guido of Pisa =

Italian geographer

Guido of Pisa (died 9 July 1169) was an Italian geographer from Pisa. In 1119 he edited and updated the Geographica, a geographic encyclopedia first created in the eighth century by the Anonymous of Ravenna. It followed in the tradition of earlier geographies, such as Strabo's Geographica, Pomponius Mela's De situ orbis, Claudius Ptolemy's Geography, and the Antonine Itinerary. Guido's book included text, as well as maps of Italy and the world as it was known to the Romans. It also included the only known text of the Carmen in victoriam Pisanorum. His map of the Western Roman Empire contains the inscription Carantano, which is probably the first cartographical mention of the Slovene territory.
