= Carmen in victoriam Pisanorum =

1087 Italian Mahdia campaign victory poem

The Carmen in victoriam Pisanorum ("Song on the occasion of the victory of the Pisans") is a poem celebrating the victory of the Italian maritime republics in the Mahdia campaign of 1087. It was probably written by a Pisan cleric within months of the campaign. G. H. Pertz was the first to note the historical value of the text in 1839. It is an important source for the development of Christian ideas about holy war on the eve of the First Crusade (1095–99), and may have been influenced by the contemporary theology of Anselm of Lucca and his circle. It seems to have influenced the Gesta Francorum, an account of the First Crusade composed by someone in the south Italian contingent. All of the later Pisan sources for the Mahdia campaign rely mainly on it: the Chronicon Pisanum only adds details about the memorial church, the Annales Pisani of Bernardo Maragone only rewords the former, and the Cronaca di Pisa of Ranieri Sardo and the Breviarium Pisanae historiae add only legendary material to the account.

== Text and structure ==
The text of the Carmen survives in a single copy in MS. 3879–919, ff. 63^{r}–65^{v}, in the Bibliothèque royale Albert I^{er} in Brussels. The manuscript originated in Italy in the twelfth century and contains 174 folios. The manuscript begins with the words "Here begins the prologue of the book of Guido, composed of various histories for diverse uses for edification of the reader", but there is no reason to believe that Guido of Pisa is the author of the Carmen. In fact, the Brussels manuscript is a careless copy of the original Liber Guidonis, which places the surviving Carmen at least two stages removed from the original. It has come down to us without a title, the conventional title has been supplied by editors.

The poem consists of 73 stanzas, each with four lines of fifteen syllables, for a total of 292 lines. It is written in Lombardic metre, which was traditionally used in Italy for historical poems and dirges, and which comprises rhyming trochaic tetrameters. In the surviving copy the rhyming is imperfect and the metre frequently fails. The author or copyist used a symbol resembling a small closing parenthesis above a dot to indicate the tetrameters and the end of every line, and a period to indicate the end of a stanza. In modern editions these may be replaced by commas, semi-colons, colons or exclamation marks where thought appropriate by the editor.

== Date and authorship ==
The Carmen was almost certainly composed shortly after the campaign it describes. It has a "ring of triumphant immediacy" that has been compared to that of other celebratory poems of the age: the Carmen de Hastingae proelio (1066), the Carmen de bello Saxonico (1075) and the Pisan Liber Maiolichinus (1115), all of which were composed shortly after the battles they describe. In favour of an early date is the lack of reference to the Crusade, but the poet does refer to the consecration of a church dedicated to Pope Sixtus II, on whose feast day (August 6), the Mahdian suburb of Zawīla was taken. If the date of composition is 1087–88, then the consecration of the church may reflect Pisan intentions rather than a fait accomplit. After the poem in the manuscript is the rubric ANNI [sic] DOMINI MILLESSIMI OCTUAGESIMO OCTAVO, meaning "in the year of the Lord one thousand and eighty-eight [that is, 1087]", which probably reflects the copyist's (or author's) belief as to when the battle occurred and not when the poem was composed.

The author's "fervid tone of urban patriotism" points to his Pisan origin. His familiarity with the Old Testament to his clerical status, and his theme of holy warfare to the theological work of Anselm of Lucca.

== Themes and purpose ==
The Carmen shows the conception of "crusading as an act of love" in an early form. This includes love of one's neighbour, as when the cleric writes, "The Genoese ... join themselves to the Pisans with great love; they do not care about earthly life, or about their sons; they give themselves to the dangers for love of the Redeemer" (Convenerunt Genuenses virtute mirabili / et adiungunt se Pisanis amore amabili. / Non curant de vita mundi nec de suis filiis, / pro amore Redemptoris se donant periculis.), and also love of God, as when Bishop Benedict of Modena urges the warriors, "[Y]ou must forget everything of the world for Christ" (pro Christo omnes mundi vos obliviscimini). The presence of Benedict itself foreshadows the presence of Italian bishops Daimbert of Pisa, Maurice of Porto and Henry of Castello on later crusades. The poet-chronicler is also clear to attribute spiritual motives to the soldiers, as when he says that "with devoted hearts they offer penance to God, and share the Eucharist of Christ in turn" (offerunt corde devoto Deo penitentiam / et communicant vicissim Christi eucharistiam).

The poet-chronicler also employs Biblical exempla in the mouth of Benedict of Modena to liken the Pisans (and their allies) to the Israelites at the Battle of Jericho, to David and to Judas Maccabeus. The poet expected men like Benedict to employ extended metaphors like this; rather than simply offer the soldier a divine reward for good service he should invite him to take his place in an ongoing historical drama.
