= Abu'l-Hasan al-Hasan ibn Ali =

Abu'l-Hasan al-Hasan ibn Ali (Arabic: أبوالحسن الحسن بن علي الزيري; February 1109 –March 1171) was the last ruler of the Zirid dynasty in Ifriqiya (10 July 1121–1148).

== Life ==
Al-Hasan succeeded his father, Ali ibn Yahya, upon the latter's death in 1121. Reduced to the coasts of modern Tunisia, during his reign, the Zirid emirate faced the increasingly threatening attacks of the Italo-Norman Kingdom of Sicily. The Normans were provoked largely by Almoravid attacks on their shores, but blamed them on the Zirids, as al-Hasan's father had requested Almoravid aid against Sicily. In the fall of 1135, the Normans occupied Djerba, and finally targeted the Zirid capital of al-Mahdiya itself in 1148. With his state's economy already in decline, and weakened further by drought and famine, al-Hasan was unable to resist the Norman attack, fleeing instead to the Hammadids in Algiers.

The Hammadids also attacked Mahdia in the summer of 1135.

There he remained under virtual house arrest until 1152, when the Almohad Caliphate under Abd al-Mu'min captured Algiers. Brought to the Almohad capital of Marrakesh, al-Hasan urged the Almohads to reconquer Ifriqiya. An Almohad expedition indeed expelled the Normans from al-Mahdiya in 1160, but al-Hasan was only allowed to settle in its extramural quarter of Zawila. He remained there until the death of Abd al-Mu'min in 1167, when he was ordered to return to Marrakesh, but died on the way at Tamasna.

== See also ==
- Mahdia campaign of 1123

== Sources ==
- Tibi, Amin (2002). "Zīrids". In Bearman, P. J.; Bianquis, Th.; Bosworth, C. E.; van Donzel, E. & Heinrichs, W. P. (eds.). The Encyclopaedia of Islam, Second Edition. Volume XI: W–Z. Leiden: E. J. Brill. pp. 513–516. doi:10.1163/1573-3912_islam_SIM_8170. ISBN 978-90-04-12756-2.

Preceded by Ali ibn Yahya	Zirid emir of Ifriqiya; 1121–1148	Sicilian conquest
