= Philip of Mahdia =

Emir of Palermo

Philip of Mahdia, a North African of berber origin, was the emir of Palermo, and successor of the great George of Antioch. He was a eunuch who rose through the ranks of the royal curia in Palermo until he was eventually one of King Roger II's most trusted men. On George's death in year 546 of the Hijrah (AD 1151 or 1152), Roger appointed him to the highest post in the kingdom.

In summer 1153, he was sent on an expedition to conquer Tunisia. The governor of Bône (ancient Hippo Regius, modern Annaba) had appealed to Roger for aid against the Almohads. Philip captured the city, treated the populace well, and then returned whence he had come. He was welcomed in Palermo as a hero cum triumpho et gloria (with triumph and glory) according to Romuald II, Archbishop of Salerno. Following Romuald's account, he was then charged with converting to Islam and promptly imprisoned and eventually admitted guilt and he was executed by orders of King Roger, who would have forgiven such an offence against his person, but not against God. This account is probably a later interpolation and its authenticity is debated. Arab chroniclers, like Ibn al-Athir, suggest that it was because Philip had allowed several prosperous and learned families to leave Bône after capture. Norwich finds that incredible and suggests that Roger, just months away from death, was either prematurely senile (echoing Hugo Falcandus) or incapacitated by poor health and so his ministers had Philip executed, probably for apostasy.

Philip was succeeded by the great Maio of Bari.

== Sources ==
- Norwich, John Julius. The Kingdom in the Sun 1130-1194. Longman: London, 1970.
- Brian Catlos, Who was Philip of Mahdia and Why Did He Have to Die? Confessional Identity and Political Power in the Twelfth-Century Mediterranean, «Mediterranean Chronicle», vol. 1, Corfu 2011.
