= Christodulus =

First emir of Norman-ruled Palermo (died 1131)

Christodulus (died 1131) (Greek: Χριστόδουλος, Christodoulos, meaning "Slave of Christ;" Arabic: Abdul Rahman al-Nasrani, meaning "Slave of the All Merciful, the Nazarene"), probably either a Greek Orthodox (the name was a common Greek Orthodox name) or a Muslim convert, was the first emir of Palermo (later ammiratus ammiratorum) under the Normans. His rise occurred after the death of Count Simon of Sicily in 1105 and he held the position of emir by 1107, during the regency of Adelaide del Vasto for her son, King Roger II of Sicily.

Originally, his position was considered that of a successor to the old Muslim governors of Palermo, but the importance of Palermo as the capital of the county and permanent seat of the Norman court, one of the largest cities in Europe and a major trading port, made his position of national significance. He was put in charge of the building of a navy and he received the titles of protonobilissimus and protonotary and was the president of the council of state. As such, he holds the first place in the development of the role of an admiral.

In 1123, Christodulus led a naval expedition against the Mahdia, but it failed miserably. He had appointed as his second-in-command George of Antioch, who was also a Greek, and the latter's brilliance in defeat began to overshadow the old emir. Christodulus was never out of favour, but his influence declined considerably after that and he was out of power by 1127, when he last appears beside George and King Roger at Montescaglioso, and he probably died around that time as well. He was succeeded by his second-in-command George of Antioch.

== Sources ==
- Norwich, John Julius. The Normans in the South 1016–1130. Longmans: London, 1967.
- Houben, Hubert (translated by Graham A. Loud and Diane Milburn). Roger II of Sicily: Ruler between East and West. Cambridge University Press, 2002.
- Cohn, W. Geschichte der Normannische Sizilische Flotte, Breslau 1910, pp. 65–68.
