= George of Antioch =

Italian admiral

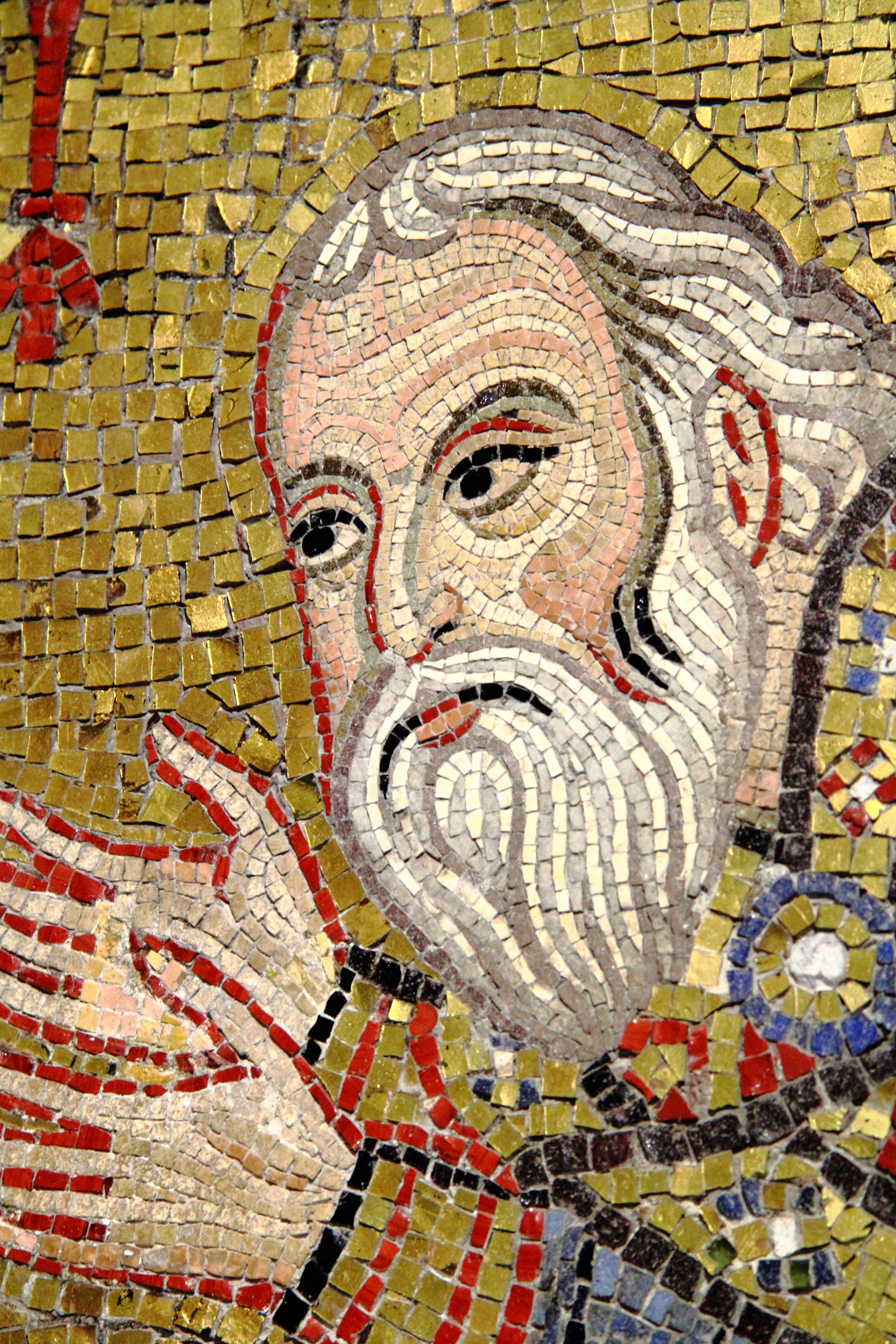
George depicted in a contemporary mosaic, in the Church of Santa Maria dell'Ammiraglio

George of Antioch (Greek: Γεώργιος ό Άντιοχεύς; c. 1080 – 1151 or 1152) was a court official and military officer in the Norman Kingdom of Sicily that played a significant role in the transformation of Norman Sicily into a multicultural society and naval power. He did so as chiefly as an advisor to Roger II of Sicily. He was a Greek Eastern Orthodox Christian from the Byzantine Empire. George lived in Antioch for a part of his life before he and his family found work with the Byzantine Emperor Alexios Komnenos until their exile from the Empire. He and his family then worked for the Emir of Ifriqiya, Tamim ibn al-Muizz, becoming governor of the city of Sousse. After the death of George's brother at the hands of Tamim's successor, Yahya, George fled the court and found refuge in Norman Sicily. There he spent the remainder of his life, serving as both an administrator and military commander with profound influence within the Kingdom of Sicily until his death.

== Early life and career ==
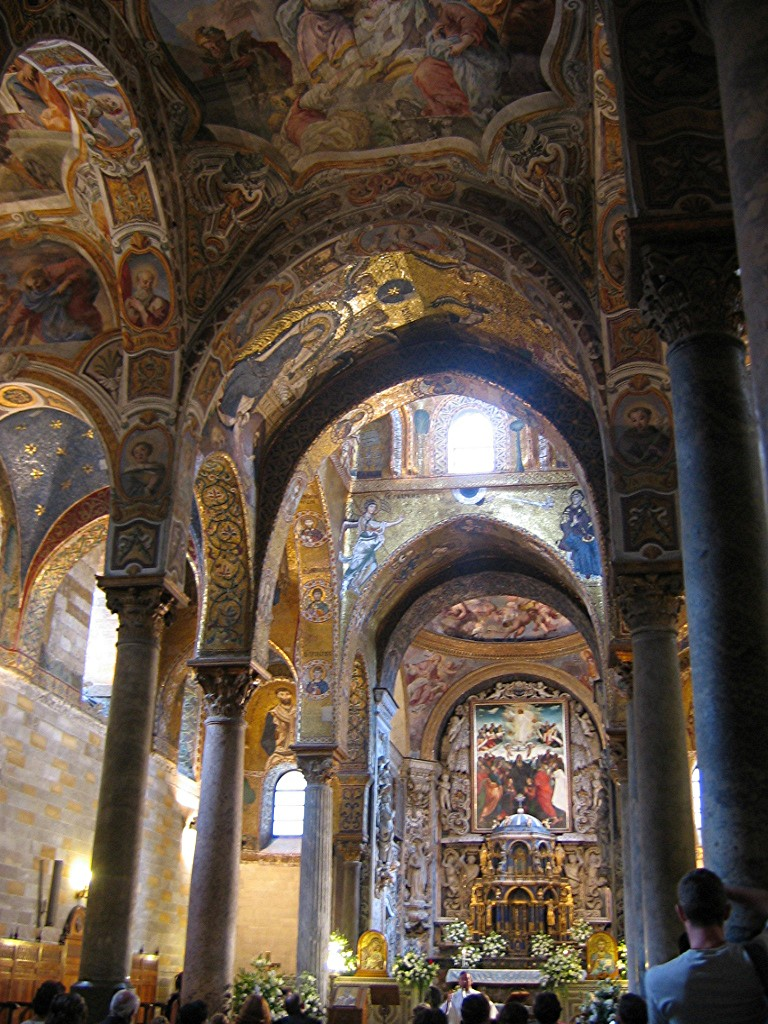
The interior of the church of Santa Maria dell'Ammiraglio in Palermo, founded by George of Antioch.

The exact location of George of Antioch's birth is uncertain, but many place it at Antioch, where it is certain that he spent a portion of his younger life. It is again unclear when he left the city, but Sarah Davis-Secord places it sometime around the Seljuk conquest of the city in 1084, whereupon George likely migrated through various other Greek cities in the Byzantine Empire before finding employment with Emperor Alexios Komnenos. 15th-century Egyptian scholar al-Maqrizi, in his biography of George of Antioch, states that sometime around the year 1087, George and his family were forced to leave Constantinople due to a grave complaint. They were exiled and shipped to sea, but their boat was intercepted by the Emir of Ifriqiya, Tamim ibn al-Muizz. Upon their arrival at his court in Mahdia, George and his family were granted audience with Tamim and persuaded him to employ them. George and his family were granted various offices, with George becoming governor of Sousse. The family stayed there until the death of George's brother Simon at the hands of Tamim's son, Yahya. Following this, George fled and relocated his family to Norman-controlled Sicily, where they found employment in the court of Roger II of Sicily in 1108. Davis-Secord asserts that George's migration across the Mediterranean is emblematic of the exchange of people and ideas that occurred in the region at that time.

== At the Norman court ==
After coming to Sicily, George was given several jobs and roles at the Norman court. One such job was as a tax collector under Christodulus, a high-ranking official in the Norman government. His many administrative and linguistic skills facilitated his rise within the Norman court. Much like in Ifriqiya, George was placed in charge of administrating the district of Iato in Sicily, and was given the position as an ambassador to the Fatimids of Egypt. Many of these positions were granted in subordination to Christodulus, who served as a mentor to George. However, as noted in the accounts of the Muslim scholars al-Maqrizi and al-Tijani, George soon began to discredit Christodulus, and took his position at court. By that time, Christodulus's power had grown to that of a prime minister or vizier, with dominion over military affairs, finances, and with power nearly equal to that of Roger II, his liege. When George took this position in 1126, he assumed all of the powers that his former mentor had possessed and served in this position until his death in either 1151 or 1152.

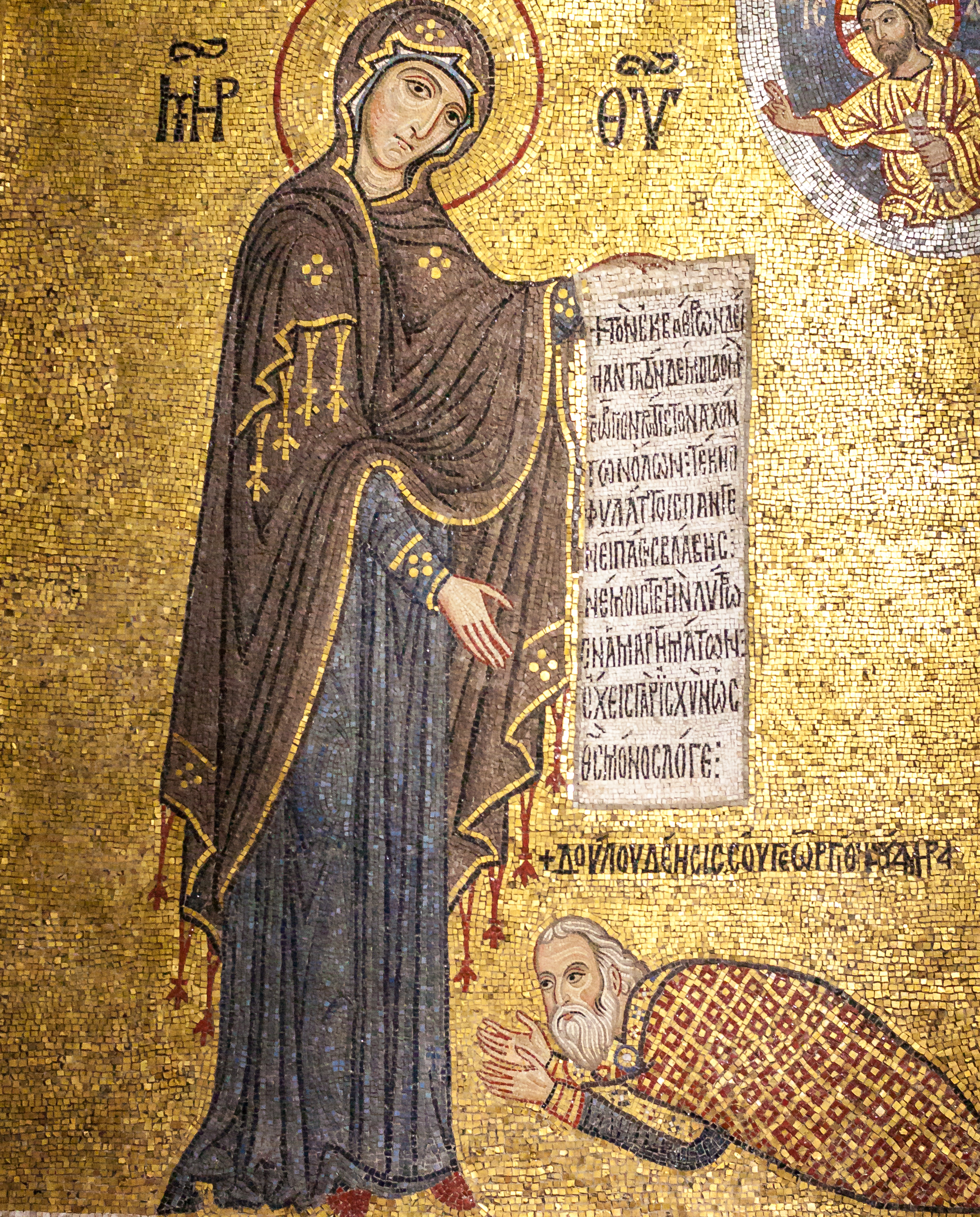
George of Antioch as a supplicant before the Virgin Mary. Mosaic from the church of Santa Maria dell'Ammiraglio.

This new position of power led to an increase in the influence that George of Antioch had on the Norman court. Familiar with the norms and traditions of Muslim courts, George was instrumental in further cementing and intensifying the Arabic character of Norman Sicily. Al-Maqrizi details a few of the ways in which George exerted his newfound influence, such as changing Roger's wardrobe to be more similar to Muslim rulers, limiting his public appearances, and making sure that the few he did make were extravagant shows of wealth and power. George also made efforts to continue already existing Arabic practices, such as the diwan, bringing the Arabic language back into that branch of the administration after it had stopped producing such documents in the years prior, as well as promoting Fatimid methods of governance through his ties to an official in the Caliphal court. It seems likely that the lack of George, who served as a bridge between the Greeks, Normans, and Arabs of Sicily, contributed to the decline in diverse cultural influences seen after his death in 1151 or 1152. Joshua Birk makes the case that the Arabic character of the Norman court was ostracized almost immediately after George's death. Birk demonstrates this with the trial of George's successor, Philip of Mahdia, who was sentenced to death after rumors of "unfaithfulness" that were likely a result of his leniency toward his fellow Berbers in North Africa (which were harsher than the terms George had put them to). However, Arabic and Muslim influences still persisted for many years, at least until the reign of King William II of Sicily, when the Muslim scholar and writer Ibn Jubayr recorded the significant Arabic presence and influence within the royal court.

== Admiral of Sicily ==
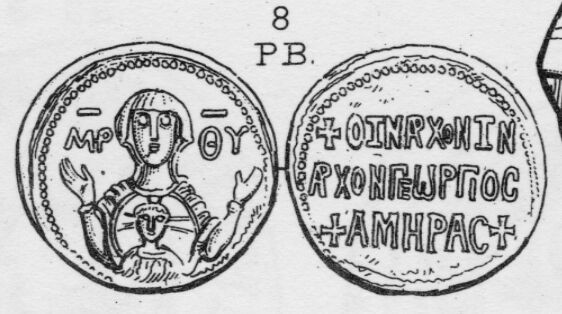
Seal of George of Antioch, bearing the titles of his offices (archōn archontōn and amēras) in Greek.

George of Antioch's military career started soon after his migration to Sicily. He was initially a commander under Christodulus, with one of their first joint ventures being the 1123 attack on Mahdia, the seat of the Zirid emirs. The attack started out successfully with the seizure of the fortress of ad-Dimas near Mahdia, but the two admirals were soon defeated at the hands of the Zirids, and lost 200 of the 300 ships they had sailed from Sicily with. Despite this catastrophic failure in the infancy of his military career, George did not seem to fall out of grace, and was given yet more military responsibilities. In the following year, 1124, George and Christodulus were summoned by Roger II to participate in his campaign in Apulia. After this, George would take the position of his mentor Christodulus and was styled as ammiratus ammiratorum, translated as "admiral of admirals," "emir of emirs," or "great admiral." George was again called to assist Roger II's armies against the lords of southern Italy. In 1131, after Roger's late 1130 coronation, George led a fleet to blockade the city of Amalfi, which Roger had demanded the subjugation of. Roger and his land troops subsequently took the city.

The next phases of George's military career took place in Africa and Greece. Starting in 1140, George began raiding the city of Mahdia on a regular basis, on King Roger II's orders. In 1146, George led an attack by sea on Tripoli, promptly taking the city, where he remained for half a year, administrating the city and seeing to its defenses. Before his return to Sicily, George appointed a local Muslim to govern the city for the Sicilians. The administration George set up in Tripoli was very similar to the one in Sicily, with many Arabic aspects of governance, such as the gesia (the Norman version of the Muslim jizya) tax put on Muslims as they had in Sicily. The attack on Mahdia was part of a larger invasion of Muslim Ifriqiya by the Normans. This is shown by the subsequent attacks on North African cities such as Sousse, Sfax, and George's final attack on Mahdia in 1148, where he returned with 300 ships, taking the city for the last time. This invasion constituted the integration of Ifriqiya into the Norman kingdom, and the establishment of Roger II's Kingdom of Africa.

George of Antioch also spent a significant amount of his time at sea fighting with the Byzantines. While there had been a history of conflict between the Normans and the Byzantines over land in Italy, Roger II took that fight to Byzantium proper through raids on Greece starting in 1147. These attacks are recorded by Greek historian Nicetas Choniates, who portrays George, his fellow Greek, as a pillager only motivated by greed. George's attacks began with the island of Corfu, which he was able to bribe due to the excessive tax burden placed on the island by the Byzantines. George then sailed into the Saronic Gulf between Athens and the Peloponnese peninsula, raiding towns such as Monemvasia. George then sailed back around the Peloponnese and into the Gulf of Corinth, where he and his troops set out onto the land, attacking Thebes, sacking and looting the city, and absconding with great wealth. George then made his way to the city of Corinth, which was lightly defended, and did much the same as he did in Thebes and returned to Sicily with his spoils in late 1147. George would return in 1148, but not before he was defeated by a coalition of Venetian and Byzantine ships. In 1149, George then managed to sail through the Aegean and harass the defenses of Constantinople.

== Legacy ==
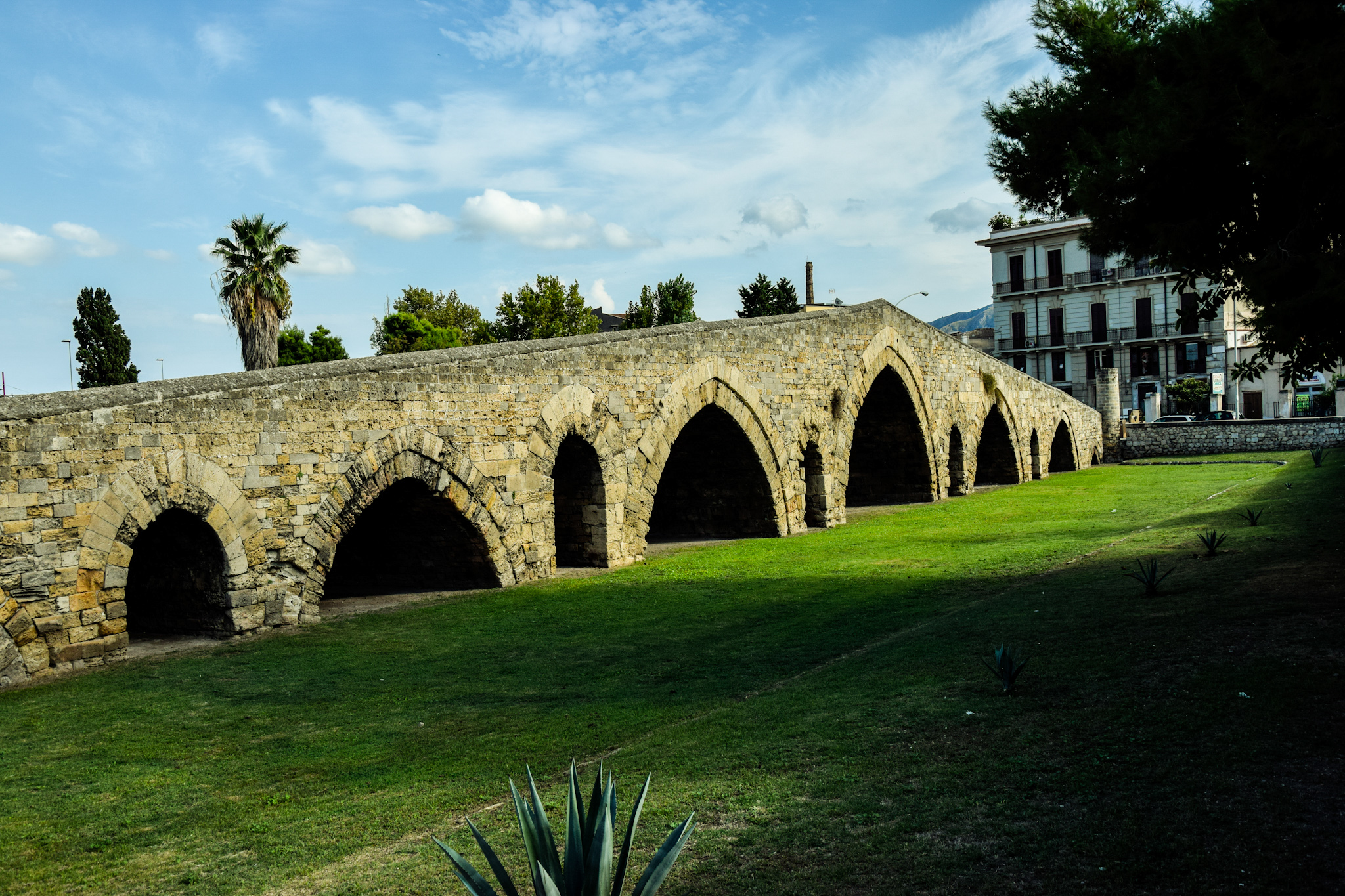
The Admiral's Bridge in Palermo.

George of Antioch's legacy is manifold. His entry into Norman society in Sicily left a lasting legacy of Arabic, Muslim, and the myriad of other cultures and their influences on the island, as well as strengthening the Kingdom of Sicily using both his administrative prowess in bolstering the Norman diwan and military expertise in the Norman campaigns around the Mediterranean. George's role in bridging cultural gaps and connecting the various ethnicities and religions of Norman Sicily into a somewhat cohesive whole indicates the shift in the narrative of the Normans in Sicily from an "enlightened" society of tolerance as British scholar John Julius Norwich indicates, to the view that Norman multiculturalism existed as a result of pragmatism and practicality. An example of these connections that still remains today is the church he sponsored in Palermo, the Santa Maria dell'Ammiraglio, or the Church of Saint Mary of the Admiral. It also later came to be known as the Martorana. George sponsored the construction in 1143. The Martorana is a prime example of Arab-Norman-Byzantine culture, combining aspects of the various cultures within Norman Sicily. This can be seen in the distinctly Greek mosaics and artworks along with various Arabic writings and inscriptions within the church. Upon his death, George was buried in the church. In 2015, the Martorana was made part of the UNESCO World Heritage Site of Arab-Norman Palermo and the Cathedral Churches of Monreale and Cefalu.
