= Ali ibn Yahya =

Ali ibn Yahya (Arabic: علي بن يحي) (1 June 1086 -10 July 1121) was the penultimate Zirid ruler of Ifriqiya, in 1116–1121 CE.

== Life ==
Ali inherited the throne from his father, Yahya ibn Tamim, in April 1116. He planned to launch attacks on the Italo-Norman Kingdom of Sicily, and sought the aid of the Almoravids for the purpose. This led to a series of clashes with the Normans in the decades after his death and culminating in the capture of the Zirid capital, Mahdia, in 1148. Ali's son, Abu'l-Hasan al-Hasan, was thus the last Zirid ruler. Ali died of a disease on Sunday 10 July 1121, leaving four sons behind him; Al Hasan, Al Aziz, Badis and Ahmad.

== Sources ==
- Tibi, Amin (2002). "Zīrids". In Bearman, P. J.; Bianquis, Th.; Bosworth, C. E.; van Donzel, E. & Heinrichs, W. P. (eds.). The Encyclopaedia of Islam, Second Edition. Volume XI: W–Z. Leiden: E. J. Brill. pp. 513–516. doi:10.1163/1573-3912_islam_SIM_8170. ISBN 978-90-04-12756-2.

| Preceded by Yahya ibn Tamim | Zirid emir of Ifriqiya; 1116–1121 | Succeeded by Abu'l-Hasan al-Hasan |
