= Yahya ibn Tamim =

Yahya ibn Tamim (Arabic: يحي بن تميم) (28 November 1065 - 25 April 1116) was the Zirid ruler of Ifriqiya from 29 February 1108 to 25 April 1116.

== Life ==
Yahya inherited the throne from his father, Tamim ibn al-Mu'izz, in February 1108. Tamim's long reign had left the Zirids weakened, as the Hilalian invasions had reduced their authority to the Tunisian coast, from Sousse to Gabes. Furthermore, Ifriqiya now faced a powerful Christian enemy in the form of the Italo-Norman Kingdom of Sicily to the north.

In response, Yahya built a strong fleet, with which he raided the Republic of Genoa and Sardinia. He was succeeded by his son, Ali ibn Yahya, after his assassination on the first day of Eid al Adha 509 AH (Wednesday 25 April 1116).

== Sources ==
- Tibi, Amin (2002). "Zīrids". In Bearman, P. J.; Bianquis, Th.; Bosworth, C. E.; van Donzel, E. & Heinrichs, W. P. (eds.). The Encyclopaedia of Islam, Second Edition. Volume XI: W–Z. Leiden: E. J. Brill. pp. 513–516. doi:10.1163/1573-3912_islam_SIM_8170. ISBN 978-90-04-12756-2.

Preceded by Tamim ibn al-Mu'izz	Zirid emir of Ifriqiya; 1108–1116	Succeeded by Ali ibn Yahya
