= Tamim ibn al-Mu'izz =

Zirid ruler

- Emir of Zirids
- Reign: 2 September 1062 – 29 February 1108
- Predecessor: Al-Mu'izz ibn Badis
- Successor: Yahya ibn Tamim
- Born: 6 July 1031; Mansouria
- Died: 29 February 1108; Mahdia
- Issue: Yahya ibn Tamim; Muthanna ibn Tamim; Ballara bint Tamim; As well as 60 other daughters and 100 other sons
Names
- Tamim ben al Mu'izz ben Bādīs ben Mansur ben Buluggin ben Ziri
- Dynasty: Zirids
- Father: Al-Mu'izz ibn Badis

Tamim ibn al-Mu'izz (Arabic: تميم بن المعز; 6 July 1031 - 29 February 1108) was the fifth ruler of the Zirids in Ifriqiya (1062–1108).

Tamim took over from his father al-Mu'izz ibn Badis (1016–1062) at a time when the Zirid realm found itself in a state of disintegration following the invasion of the Banu Hilal. Only the coastal towns were under control, and a reconquest of the hinterland from the Bedouin failed. Even on the coast the Zirids were not unchallenged - Tunis was lost to the Khurasanid dynasty (1063–1128). The capital, Mahdia, was attacked by the city-states of Genoa and Pisa in 1087 and forced to pay a high ransom - a sign of the growing dominance of Christian powers in the Mediterranean which also manifested itself in the Norman conquest of Sicily (1061–1093).

Tamim did attempt to stymie the Norman conquest so as to regain prestige for the dynasty, as well as emulating the campaigns of his father in the 1030s. Thus he sent his two sons Ali and Ayyub to the island in 1062; for 7 years they attempted to defeat the Normans but were unable to dislodge them from their base at Troina, losing badly at the Battle of Cerami in 1063. However, Ayyub was able to establish himself in the Sicilian capital of Palermo thanks to the deaths of Ibn al-Thumna and Ibn al-Hawwas, gaining dominance over much of the western and central regions for the Island. In 1068 they suffered a humiliating loss near Palermo at the battle of Misilmeri, turning the Sicilian populace against them, who expelled the two sons of Tamim. With their expulsion the island’s defenses did not merely weaken; they dissolved. Muslim Sicily stood naked before its doom. The fall of Palermo in 1072 initiated an 18 year long, arduous Norman reduction of the remaining Muslim fortresses. The fall of Noto in 1091 marked the end of over 250 years of Muslim rule in Sicily.

Tamim is described as handsome, both his face and sculpture; he was well-built, had a pearly complexion, a slim nose and wide-open eyebrows. He also purged himself frequently, thinking he was maintaining his health, he used to go regularly to the hammam and used fire medication. He was an avid drug user and had frequent sexual relations. His drug use caused his skin to dry and fitness exercises were harder for him as time passed by.

Tamim's son Yahya ibn Tamim inherited what was left of the Zirid kingdom in 1108.

== Sources ==
- Tibi, Amin (2002). "Zīrids". In Bearman, P. J.; Bianquis, Th.; Bosworth, C. E.; van Donzel, E. & Heinrichs, W. P. (eds.). The Encyclopaedia of Islam, Second Edition. Volume XI: W–Z. Leiden: E. J. Brill. pp. 513–516. doi:10.1163/1573-3912_islam_SIM_8170. ISBN 978-90-04-12756-2.
- Hadi, Roger Idris (1962). La Berberie Orientale Sous les Zirides (PDF). p. 251.

Preceded by Al-Mu'izz ibn Badis	Zirid emir of Ifriqiya; 1062–1108	Succeeded by Yahya ibn Tamim
