= History of Syracuse =

Topics referred to by the same term

History of Syracuse may refer to:

- Timeline of Syracuse, Sicily
- History of Syracuse, New York State, USA

== See also ==
- List of mayors of Syracuse (disambiguation)
- Battle of Syracuse (disambiguation)
- Siege of Syracuse (disambiguation)
- Syracuse (disambiguation)
