= Count of Syracuse =

Count of Syracuse may refer to:

- Jordan of Hauteville (1060–1092), count of Syracuse (1091–1092); reconquest from Arab holding in 1091
- Tancred, Count of Syracuse (12th century; fl. 1104)
- Simon, Count of Syracuse (12th century; fl. 1162)
- Alamanno da Costa (died 1229), count of Syracuse (1190s–stripped 1208)
- Prince Leopold, Count of Syracuse (life 1813–1860), count of Syracuse (1816–1860)

== See also ==
- Tyrant of Syracuse
- Duke of Syracuse
- List of mayors of Syracuse, Sicily
- Syracuse (disambiguation)
