= Siege of Taormina =

Siege of Taormina may refer to:

- Siege of Taormina (962), Fatimid conquest of Sicily
- Siege of Taormina (1078)
- Siege of Taormina (1676)
