= Francesco Italia =

Italian politician

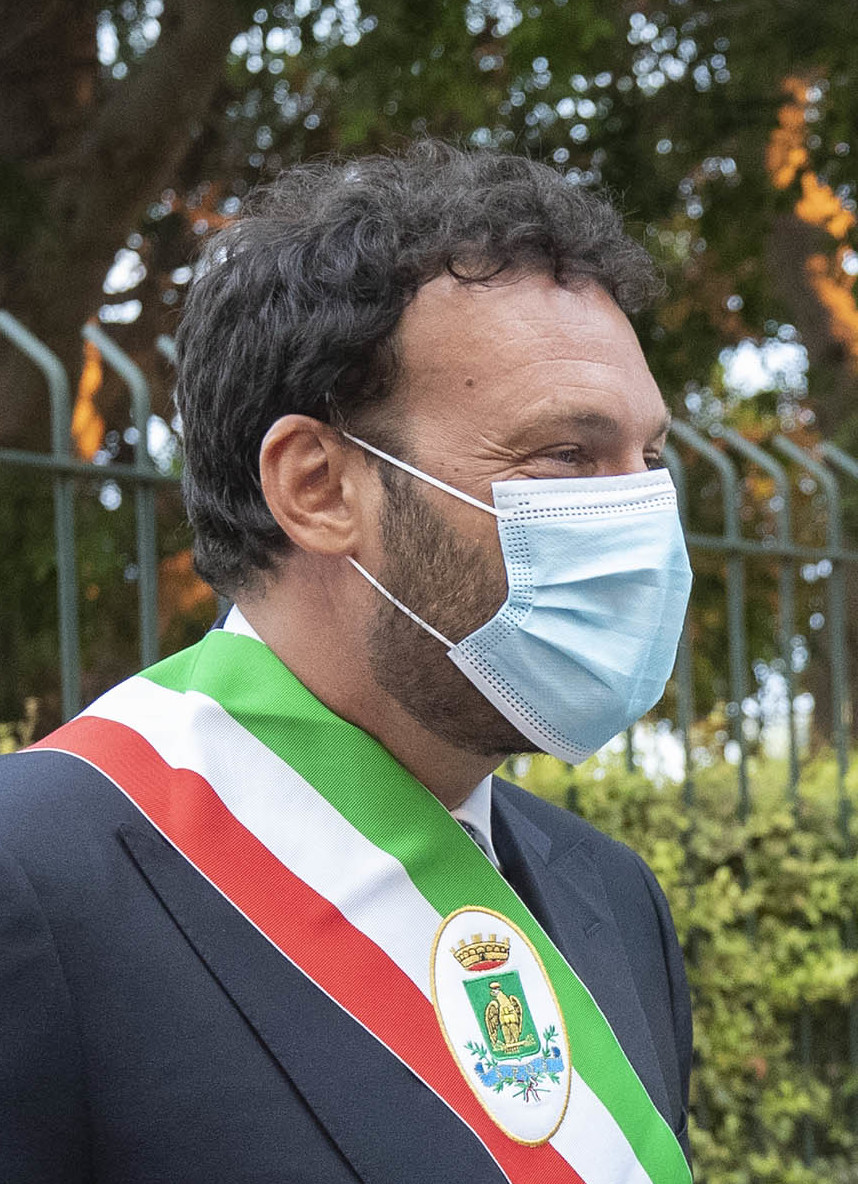
- Francesco Italia at the Greek Theatre of Syracuse on July 19 2021

Mayor of Syracuse
- Incumbent
- Assumed office 27 June 2018
- Preceded by: Giancarlo Garozzo

Personal details
- Born: 11 September 1972 (age 54) Milan, Lombardy, Italy
- Party: Action
- Education: University of Milan

Francesco Italia (born 11 September 1972) is an Italian journalist and politician who has served as the Mayor of Syracuse since 2018, and is a member of Action. Prior to his tenure as mayor he served as deputy mayor under Mayor Giancarlo Garozzo from 2013 to 2018. Before he lived in Syracuse he was active in Milan, where he ran for office and was the manager of GAY.tv.

== Early life and education ==
Francesco Italia was born in Milan, Italy, on 11 September 1972. He graduated with a law degree from the University of Milan and was the manager of GAY.tv. Carlo Taormina and Carla De Albertis, both members of the Chamber of Deputies, criticised Italia and GAY.tv in 2004, stating that he was "screwed up in the head" and that he was abnormal for being gay.

== Career ==
Italia ran for office in Milan in the 2006 election as a member of the Lista Civica Moratti before moving to Syracuse in 2008.

Mayor Giancarlo Garozzo appointed Italia as the deputy mayor of Syracuse in 2013. During Garozzo's administration Italia worked in the tourism, culture, entertainment, and sports department and with UNESCO.

In the 2018 Syracuse mayoral election Garozzo declined to seek reelection. Italia, with the support of centre-left parties, defeated Ezechia Paolo Reale, who was supported by centre-right parties, in the runoff. Giovanni Randazzo, Fabio Moschella, and Fabio Granata, who were all candidates in the first round, endorsed him in the runoff. With the support of five civic lists, including three from his opponents in the first round, was reelected in 2023, after defeating Ferdinando Messina in the runoff. Italia is a member of Action.

== Works cited ==
=== News ===
- "GAY.TV NELLA BUFERA MA…". GAY.tv. 9 April 2004. Archived from the original on 22 June 2025.
- "Comunali: a Siracusa Francesco Italia riconfermato sindaco, ad Acireale vince Barbagallo". Agenzia Nazionale Stampa Associata. 12 June 2023. Archived from the original on 22 June 2025.
- "Francesco Italia". Blog Sicilia. Archived from the original on 22 June 2025.
- "Il nuovo sindaco è Francesco Italia". Agenzia Nazionale Stampa Associata. 25 June 2018. Archived from the original on 22 June 2025.
- ""VOI GAY SIETE ANORMALI…"". GAY.tv. 1 June 2004. Archived from the original on 22 June 2025.
- Funaro, Nicholas (25 June 2018). "Chi è Italia, nuovo sindaco di Siracusa. Ecco la sua giunta". il Sicilia. Archived from the original on 22 June 2025.
- Taddeucci, Roberto (24 May 2006). "CANDIDATI LGBT A MILANO". GAY.tv. Archived from the original on 22 June 2025.

=== Web ===
- "Anagrafe degli Amministratori Locali e Regionali". Ministry of the Interior. Archived from the original on 2 February 2021.

Political offices
Preceded by Giancarlo Garozzo	Mayor of Syracuse since 2018	Succeeded by Incumbent
