= Syracuse High School =

Syracuse High School may refer to:

- Syracuse High School (Syracuse, Utah)
- Syracuse High School (Syracuse, Kansas), unified high school for Hamilton County, Kansas, in Syracuse, Kansas
- Syracuse High School (Syracuse, Nebraska), high school in Syracuse, Nebraska

== See also ==
- Syracuse City School District, a school district in Syracuse, New York
- Cicero – North Syracuse High School, Cicero, New York
- East Syracuse-Minoa High School, Manlius, New York
- Syracuse Junior High School, Syracuse, Utah, in Davis School District
- Syracuse Elementary School (disambiguation)
- Syracuse (disambiguation)
