= Syracuse Stars =

Syracuse Stars may refer to:

== Baseball ==
- Syracuse Stars (National League), 1877–1879 (1879 in the NL)
- Syracuse Stars (American Association), 1885–1890 (1890 in the AA)
- Syracuse Stars (minor league baseball), various minor league teams which played between 1877 and 1929
- Syracuse Stars (football), a semi-pro gridiron football team playing in 1920; see 1920 Rochester Jeffersons season

== Ice hockey ==
- Syracuse Stars (amateur hockey), 1996–2010, a Junior A team in the Eastern Junior Hockey League
- Syracuse Stars (ice hockey), a minor-league professional ice hockey team from 1930–1940
- Syracuse Stars (NCDC), a Tier II junior ice hockey team from 2017 to 2019

== See also ==
- Sports in Syracuse, New York, USA
- Syracuse (disambiguation)
