= Mayor of Syracuse =

Mayor of Syracuse may refer to:

- List of mayors of Syracuse, New York, USA
- List of mayors of Syracuse, Sicily, Italy

== See also ==
- List of tyrants of Syracuse of Sicily
- Count of Syracuse
- Duke of Syracuse
- Syracuse (disambiguation)
