= Siracusa =

Siracusa may refer to:

== Places ==
- Province of Syracuse (Italian: Siracusa), Sicily
- Syracuse, Sicily (Italian: Siracusa), the capital of the Italian province of the same name
- Roman Catholic Archdiocese of Siracusa, Sicily, Italy
- Siracusa railway station, Syracuse, Sicily, Italy

== People ==
- Chiara Siracusa (born 1976), a Maltese singer
- Ernest V. Siracusa (1918–2000), U.S. diplomat
- Joe Siracusa, U.S. musician
- Mayla Siracusa (born 1980), a Brazilian water polo player

== Sports ==
- A.S.D. Città di Siracusa, Syracuse, Syracuse, Sicily, Italy; the football team currently representing the city, also known as Siracusa Calcio
- U.S. Siracusa, Syracuse, Syracuse, Sicily, Italy; a defunct football club
- A.S. Siracusa, Syracuse, Syracuse, Sicily, Italy; a defunct football club

== Other uses ==
- Siracusa lemon

== See also ==
- Syracuse (disambiguation)
