= Syracuse =

Syracuse most commonly refers to:

- Syracuse, Sicily, Italy; in the province of Syracuse
- Syracuse, New York, US; in the Syracuse metropolitan area

Syracuse may also refer to:

== Places ==
- Syracuse railway station (disambiguation)

=== Italy ===
- Province of Syracuse, Sicily, Italy
- Roman Catholic Archdiocese of Siracusa (also known as Syracuse), Sicily, Italy

=== United States ===
- Syracuse, Indiana
- Syracuse Lake, Kosciusko County, Indiana; a lake
- Syracuse, Kansas
- Syracuse, Missouri
- Syracuse, Nebraska
- Syracuse metropolitan area, New York
  - Syracuse Hancock International Airport, New York, US
    - Syracuse Army Airbase
- Syracuse, Ohio
- Syracuse, Oregon
- Syracuse, Utah

== People ==
- Duke of Syracuse
- Count of Syracuse
- Tyrant of Syracuse

== Schools ==
- Syracuse City School District, Syracuse, New York, US
- Syracuse Elementary School (disambiguation)
- Syracuse High School (disambiguation)
- Syracuse State School, Syracuse, New York, US
- Syracuse University, Syracuse, New York, US

== Sports ==
- Syracuse FC, a soccer team based in Syracuse, New York, US
- Syracuse Mets, a minor league baseball club based in Syracuse, New York, US
- Syracuse Pros, a pro American football team based in Syracuse, New York, US; in the American Professional Football Association (the predecessor of the NFL)
- Syracuse Orange, the collective identity for Syracuse University athletic teams, from Syracuse, New York, US
- Syracuse Grand Prix, Sicily, Italy

== Military ==
- Battle of Syracuse (disambiguation)
- Siege of Syracuse (disambiguation)

== Other ==
- Syracuse (satellite), a series of French military communications satellites

== See also ==
- List of tyrants of Syracuse
- Mayor of Syracuse (disambiguation)
- Sports in Syracuse, New York, US
  - Syracuse Stars (disambiguation)
- Downtown Syracuse, New York, US
- East Syracuse, New York, US
- North Syracuse, New York, US
- Siracusa (disambiguation)
