= Sports in Syracuse =

Overview article

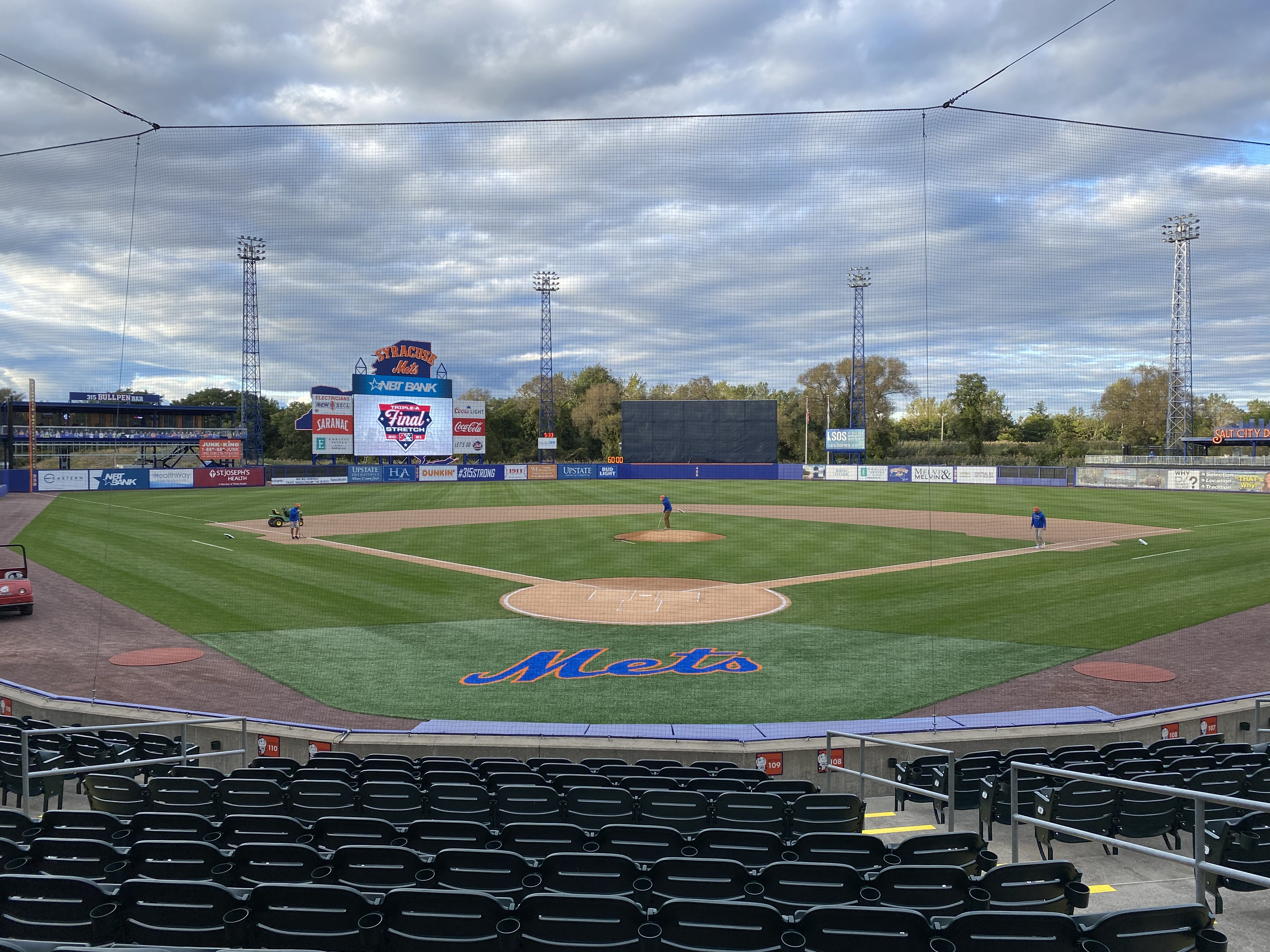
NBT Bank Stadium is home to the Syracuse Mets

Syracuse, New York, United States, is a top-division, minor-league and college sports city. Teams include the Syracuse Mets of AAA Baseball and the Syracuse Crunch of the AHL. The most attended sporting events in Syracuse are those of the NCAA Division I Syracuse University Orange.

== Professional teams ==
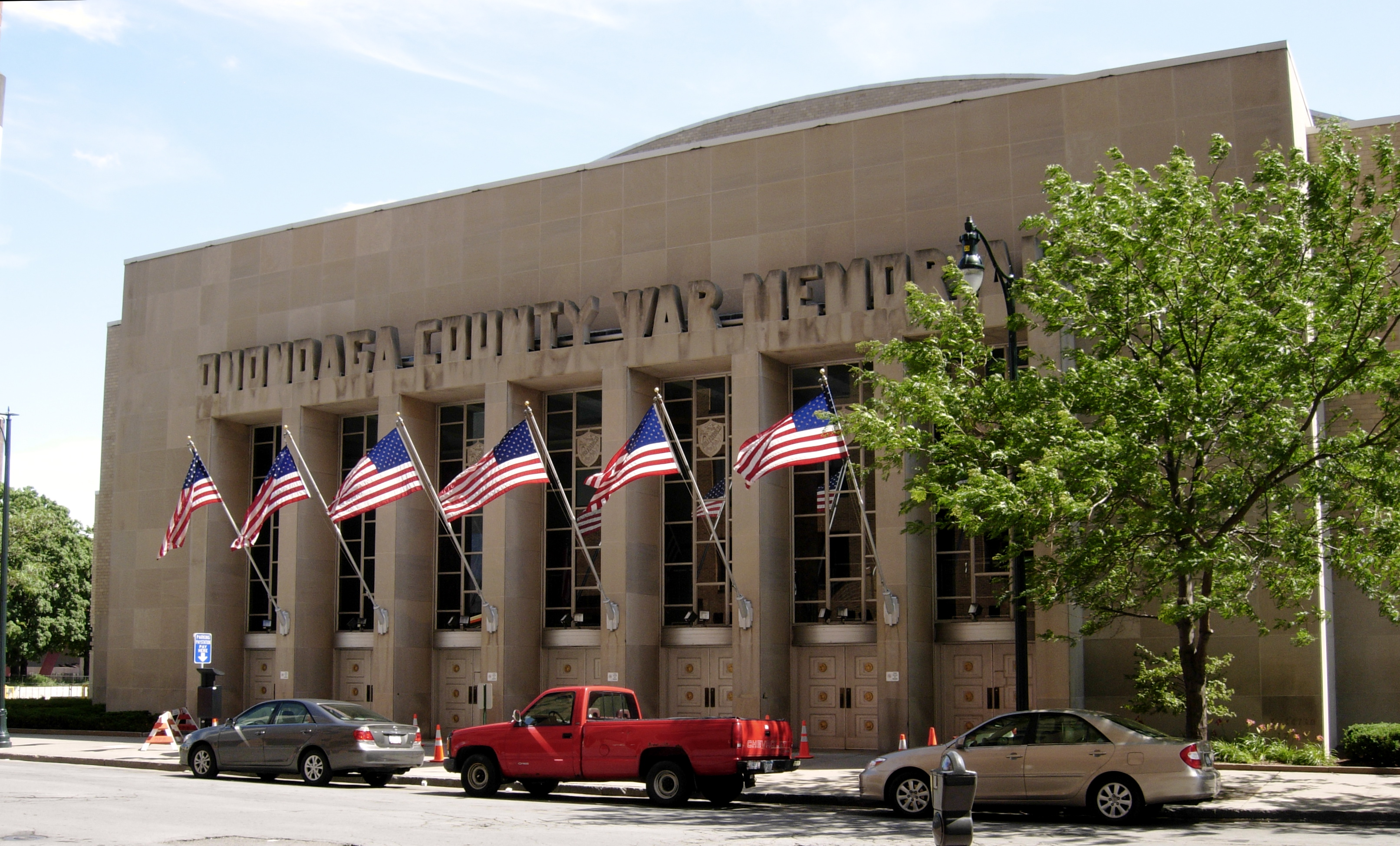
War Memorial at Oncenter, venue for the Crunch

The Syracuse Mets, who play in the International League, are a AAA Minor League Baseball affiliate of the New York Mets.

The Syracuse Crunch are an American Hockey League affiliate of the Tampa Bay Lightning.

== History ==
Syracuse has had several top-level pro teams. Most notable are the Syracuse Nationals, an NBA team which played 17 seasons in Syracuse (1947–1963) before moving to Philadelphia to become the Philadelphia 76ers; and two different Major League Baseball teams: the Syracuse Stars of the National League in 1879, which didn't finish their first season; and the Syracuse Stars of the American Association in 1890.

=== Baseball ===
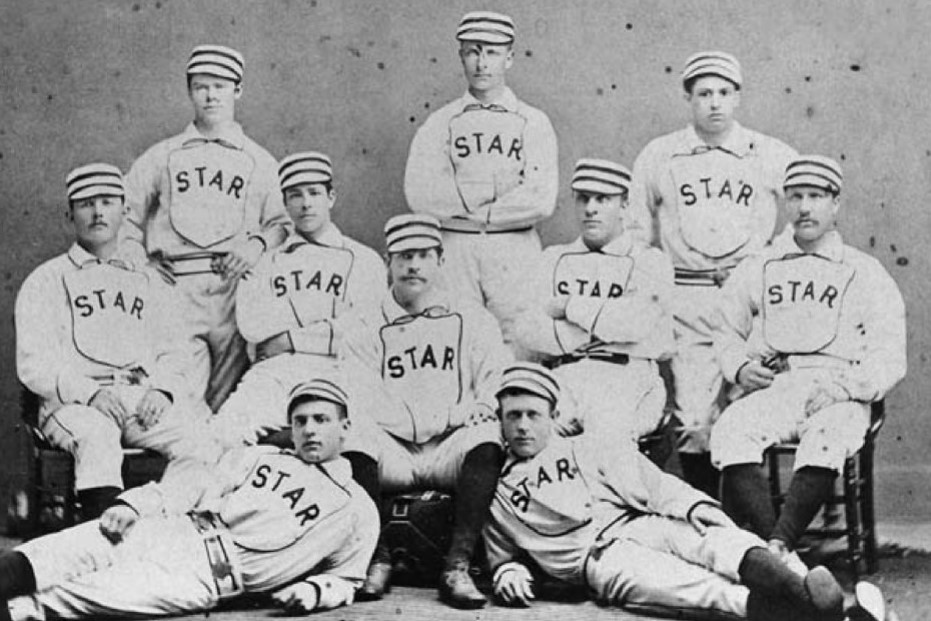
Syracuse Stars baseball team, 1877

Syracuse has been represented in professional baseball for all but four years since 1877, when the Syracuse Stars competed in the League Alliance, an early minor league. Syracuse fielded two major league versions of the Stars: in the 1879 National League and the 1890 American Association. Apart from those seasons, however, the Stars were members of high minor leagues such as the Eastern League (forerunner to the International) and the New York State League through 1917. From 1918 to 1927, the Stars competed in the International League and were an early farm team of the St. Louis Cardinals. In 1928 the IL franchise moved to Montreal and became the Montreal Royals. The Stars moved down one classification to the New York–Penn League for 1 1/2 seasons before moving to nearby Utica.

=== Basketball ===
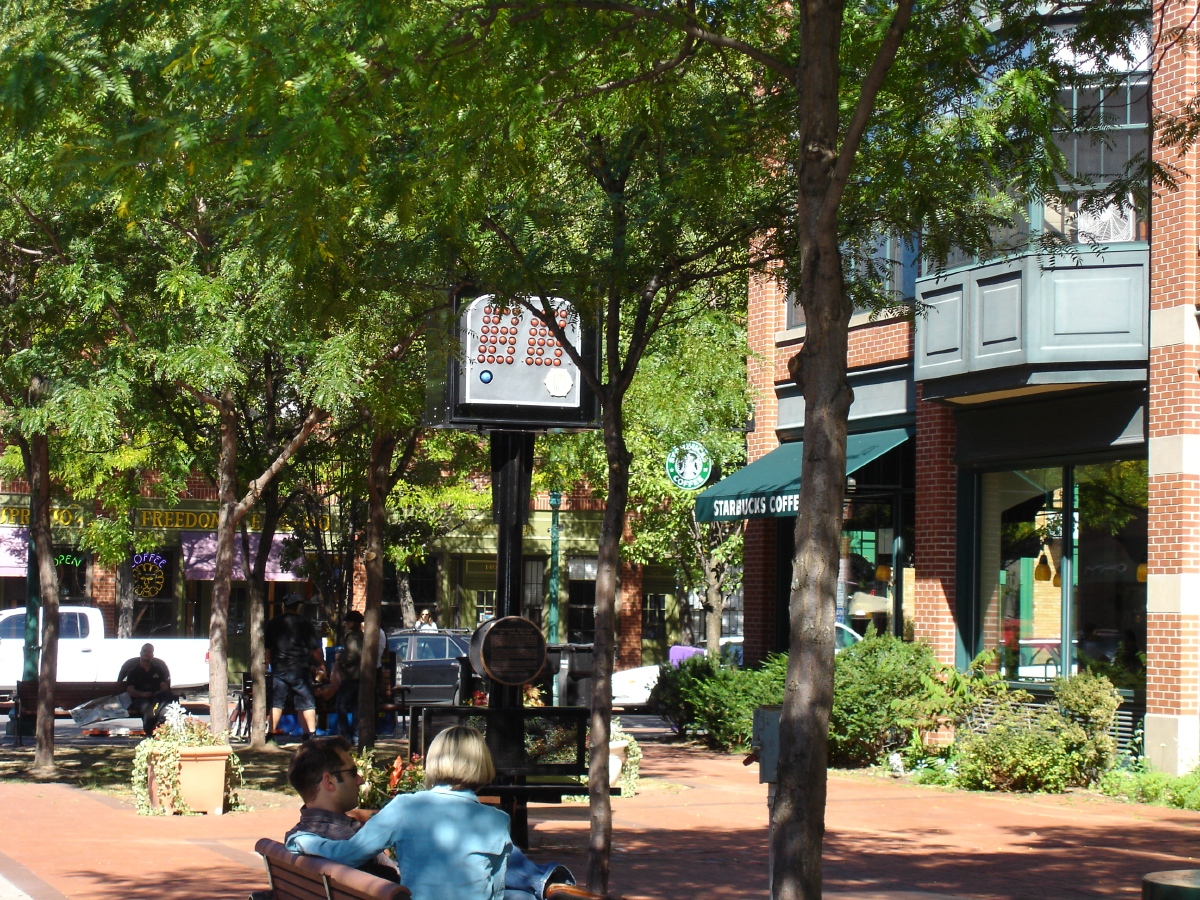
The basketball shot clock was invented and first used by the Syracuse Nationals.

Syracuse was from 1946 until 1963 home to the NBA's Syracuse Nationals, which are now the Philadelphia 76ers. They played 17 seasons in Syracuse and won the NBA championship in 1955. The NBA's 24-second clock was invented in and first came into use in Syracuse. In March 2005 the city dedicated a monument to this fact. It is a 125% scaled model of the original shot clock used.

The Syracuse Stallions were founded in 2017, and played in the American Basketball Association (ABA) and The Basketball League (TBL) before folding in 2023.

The Syracuse Upstate Trojans played a single season in the American Basketball Association (ABA) from 2023 to 2024. They rebranded as the Syracuse Monarchs for the 2025–26 ABA season.

=== Football ===
Syracuse had a professional football team from 1890 to 1900 known as the Syracuse Athletic Association, the independent All-Syracuse team which was known in 1921 as the Syracuse Pros in the American Professional Football Association before leaving the league and reverting to the All-Syracuse team, and briefly in the 1936 American Football League season known as the Syracuse Braves.

In 1902, the first World Series of Football was played at New York's original Madison Square Garden. The five teams in the tournament were the New York Knickerbockers, Syracuse AC, Warlow AC, the Orange (New Jersey) AC, and New York. Syracuse won the tournament 6–0 with Glenn (Pop) Warner at guard. The December 28, 1902, game where Syracuse defeated New York 5–0 at Madison Square Garden is credited as the first indoor pro football game.

The Syracuse Express were established in 1984, and were members of the Mid Continental Football League, before that league contracted into the Midwest. They joined the upstart New York Amateur Football League (NYAFL), where they became one of the league's premier teams, along with their rivals, the Buffalo Gladiators. After absorbing the Cortland Warriors, in 1999 the team became the Central New York Express, although they still played their games in suburban Syracuse. The Express won one NYAFL title in 2003. The NYAFL merged to become the Northeastern Football Alliance and with the change, the team changed and was replaced by a new team named the Syracuse Shock.

Syracuse had a team for one season in the American Indoor Football League called the Syracuse Soldiers.

Syracuse has a minor league football team, Syracuse Strong.

Syracuse is also the home of the Central New York Blue Devils of American Indoor Football (as of March 12 2026).

=== Ice hockey ===
Syracuse has had several American Hockey League teams, which traditionally did not last longer than three seasons. The Syracuse Blazers began play in the Eastern Hockey League in 1973. The league disbanded in 1973; the team then affiliated with the North American Hockey League. 1994 marked the introduction of a new team, the Syracuse Crunch, which have been playing at the Upstate Medical University Arena since.

=== Lacrosse ===
The Syracuse Spirit was a member of the American Lacrosse League, a short lived professional lacrosse league in 1988, based in Syracuse, New York. The Spirit played their home games at the Griffin Field in Liverpool, New York. The general manager of the Spirit was Tom Scofield and the head coach was Jim Booth. The Spirit had a 4–1 record when the league folded.

Syracuse had a team in the National Lacrosse League (NLL) called the Syracuse Smash for three seasons from 1998 to 2000. They moved to Ottawa in 2001 and became the Ottawa Rebel.

=== Soccer ===
The first professional team in the city were the Syracuse Scorpions, who played in the American Soccer League in the 1970s. The Syracuse Salty Dogs existed for two seasons (2002–2004) until folding due to financial problems. The game attendance had been among the highest in the A-League. The Syracuse Silver Knights played in the Major Arena Soccer League from 2010 before moving to Utica and becoming Utica City FC in 2018.

== Venues ==
Sports venues in and around Syracuse include the following:

=== JMA Wireless Dome ===
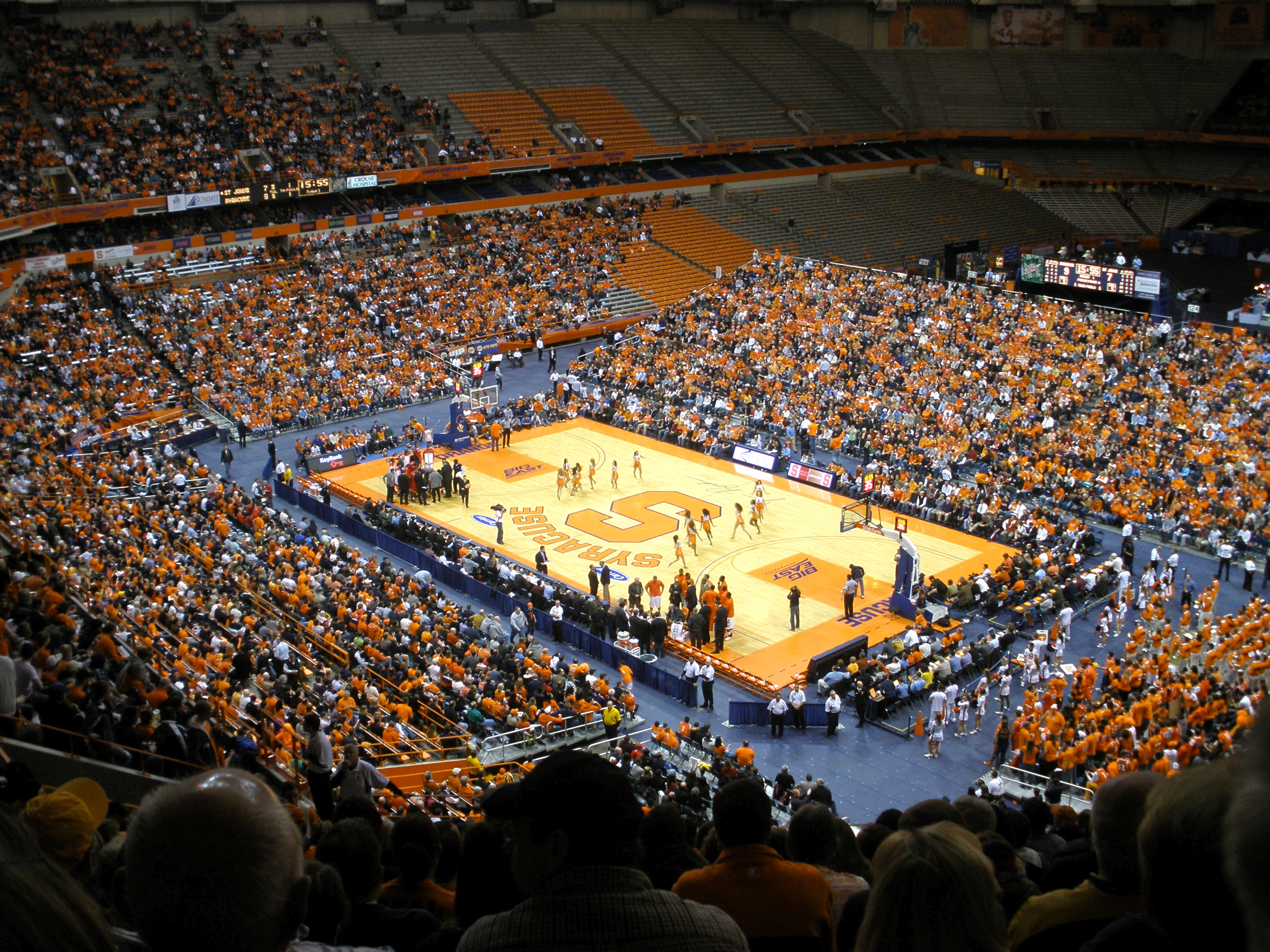
Basketball at Syracuse University's JMA Wireless Dome stadium

Syracuse University's JMA Wireless Dome can hold over 33,000 and 50,000 people, for basketball and football respectively, making it the largest domed stadium in the Northeastern United States and the largest on a college campus. Especially the Orange's basketball games have been making use of the Dome's capacity over the past few years. The third most attended college sporting events are lacrosse games, with the Orange at times drawing over 6,000 fans.

=== Other indoor arenas ===
- Tennity Ice Skating Pavilion, Syracuse University (ice hockey)
- Upstate Medical University Arena (ice hockey)

=== Golf courses ===
- Atunyote Golf Club, Turning Stone Resort
- Burnet Park Golf Course
- Drumlins Country Club (36-hole golf course)
- Green Lakes Golf Course

=== Ski areas and resorts ===
- Bristol Mountain Ski Resort, Canandaigua
- Four Seasons Golf and Ski Center, Fayetteville
- Greek Peak Mountain Resort, Cortland
- Highland Forest (county park), Fabius (cross-country)
- Labrador Mountain, Truxton
- Osceola Tug Hill Cross-Country Ski Center, Osceola
- Song Mountain Resort, Tully
- Toggenburg Mountain, Fabius

== College teams ==
=== Syracuse University Orange ===
Syracuse University, NCAA Division I

Men's teams

- Basketball
- Cross Country
- Football
- Lacrosse
- Rowing
- Soccer
- Track & Field

Women's teams

- Basketball
- Cross Country
- Field Hockey
- Ice Hockey
- Lacrosse
- Rowing
- Soccer
- Softball
- Tennis
- Track & Field
- Volleyball

=== Le Moyne College Dolphins ===
Le Moyne College, NCAA Division I

Men's teams

- Baseball
- Basketball
- Cross Country
- Golf
- Lacrosse
- Soccer
- Swimming/Diving

Women's teams

- Basketball
- Cross Country
- Lacrosse
- Soccer
- Softball
- Swimming/Diving
- Tennis
- Volleyball

=== SUNY-ESF Mighty Oaks ===
State University of New York College of Environmental Science and Forestry, USCAA

Men's teams

- Basketball
- Cross Country
- Golf
- Soccer
- Woodsman

Women's teams

- Cross Country
- Soccer
- Woodsman

=== Onondaga Community College Lazers ===
Onondaga Community College, NJCAA Division III

== National championships ==
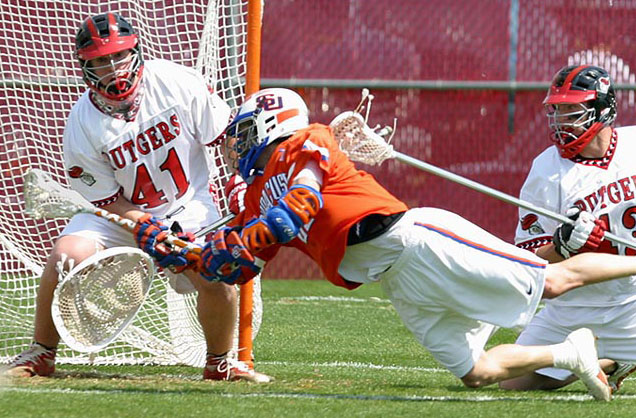
2004 Syracuse Orange men's lacrosse, National Champions

Baseball

- 1878: Syracuse Stars: International Association (AAA Baseball) Pennant

Basketball

- 1955: Syracuse Nationals: NBA World Champions
- 2003: Syracuse University Orange: NCAA Division I Basketball National Champions

Field Hockey

- 2015: Syracuse University Orange: NCAA Division I Field Hockey National Champions - 1st Women's program at Syracuse to win a national championship

Football

- 1959: Syracuse University Orange: NCAA Division I-A Football National Champions

Lacrosse

- Syracuse University Orange: NCAA Division I Lacrosse National Champions:
  - 1983, 1988, 1989, 1993, 1995, 2000, 2002, 2004, 2008, 2009.
- 2004: Le Moyne College Dolphins: NCAA Division II Lacrosse National Champions
- 2016: Le Moyne College Dolphins: NCAA Division II Lacrosse National Champions

Note: Until 2004, Syracuse University's teams were called the Orangemen and Orangewomen. Now they are known as the Orange.

== See also ==
- Athletics in upstate New York
- History of lacrosse
- List of ski areas and resorts in the United States
- New York State Canalway Trail
- Ski country
- Sports in New York
- Sports in New York's Capital District
- Syracuse Orange baseball
