= American Lacrosse League (1988) =

Lacrosse league

- Sport: Field lacrosse
- Founded: 1988
- Folded: 1988
- No. of teams: 6
- Country: United States
- Last champion: Not awarded

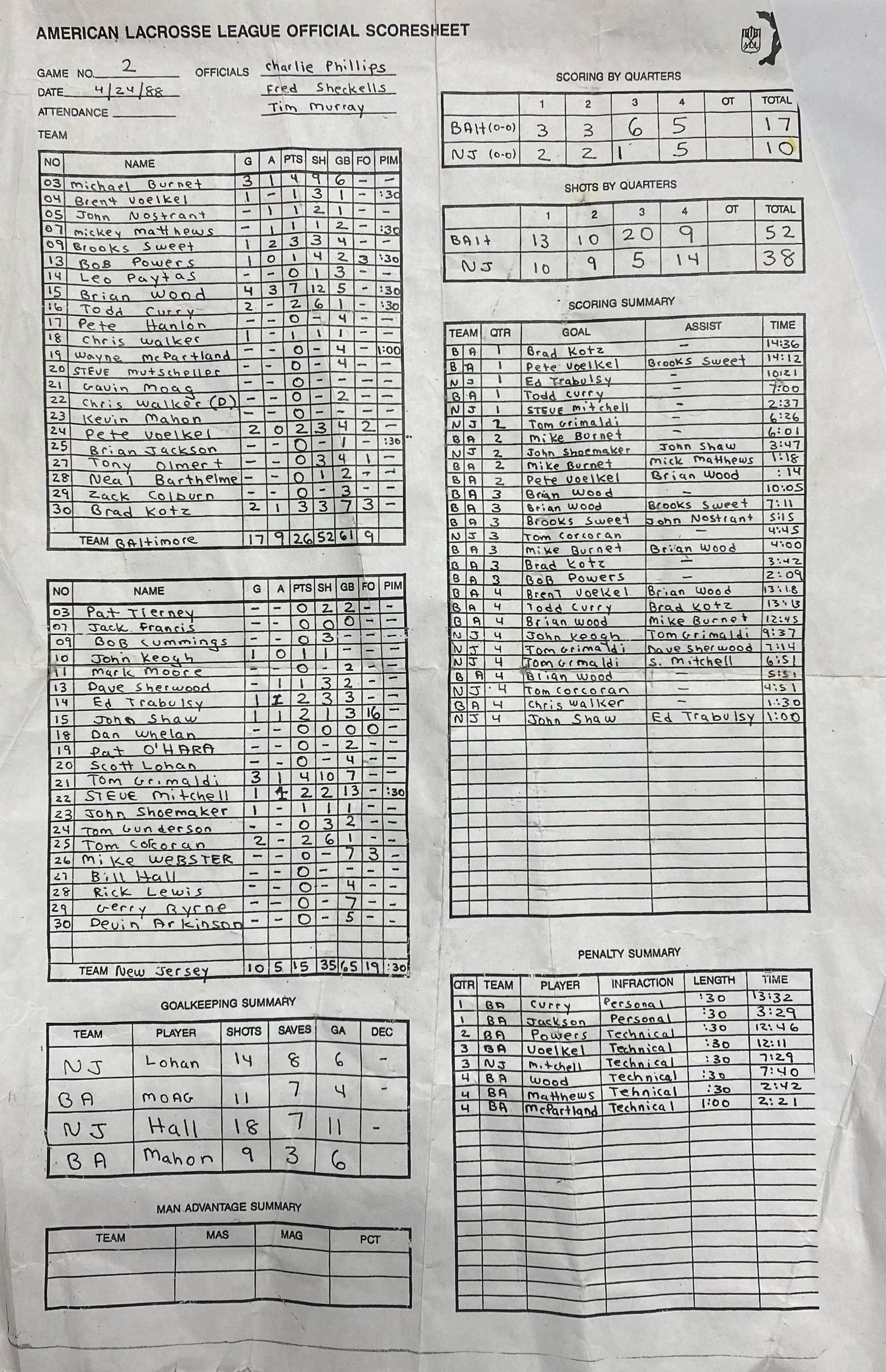
Photo of the scorebook from the 1988 ALL Pro Lacrosse Game between the NJ Arrows and the Baltimore Tribe

The American Lacrosse League ("ALL") was a professional lacrosse league that played for one partial season in 1988. At the time, it featured advanced lacrosse players across the world. It was founded by Terry Wallace and Bruce Meierdiercks, former teammates at Adelphi University. The league folded after five weeks of play.

Wallace and Meierdiercks tried to fashion the new league after the success of the Major Indoor Lacrosse League which commenced operations in 1987. Both leagues employed a "single entity" ownership model, instead of franchise being owned individually. The league owned all of the teams which helped to keep costs down.

Meierdiercks in announcing the league's formation stated "Terry and I were All Americans and we love lacrosse. We're not doing this for the money. We're financially sound and in a position to do this for two years." He continued "then we plan to sell the franchises to the GM's - at least give them the first right of refusal. Then Terry and I will probably take over an expansion franchise in Philadelphia or Los Angeles or San Francisco." Meierdiericks claimed at the time that he and Wallace invested $2 million of their own capital into the league by "pre-paying" expenses to give the infant league two years of financial runway.

In an attempt to distance the outdoor version from the pro wrestling atmosphere that permeated the MILL, in a "shot across the MILL's bow" the ALL leaders stated the games would be played in a family atmosphere with no alcoholic beverages sold, affordable ticket prices ($8 per game single tickets and $56 season tickets) and the players were to be "drug tested." The ALL stated that with 2,500 paying fans per game, the league could break even the first year. The league introduced numerous rule changes to the sport designed to create more offense and excitement including a 25 second clearing clock and 3 long stick defenders on the field maximum at any one time.

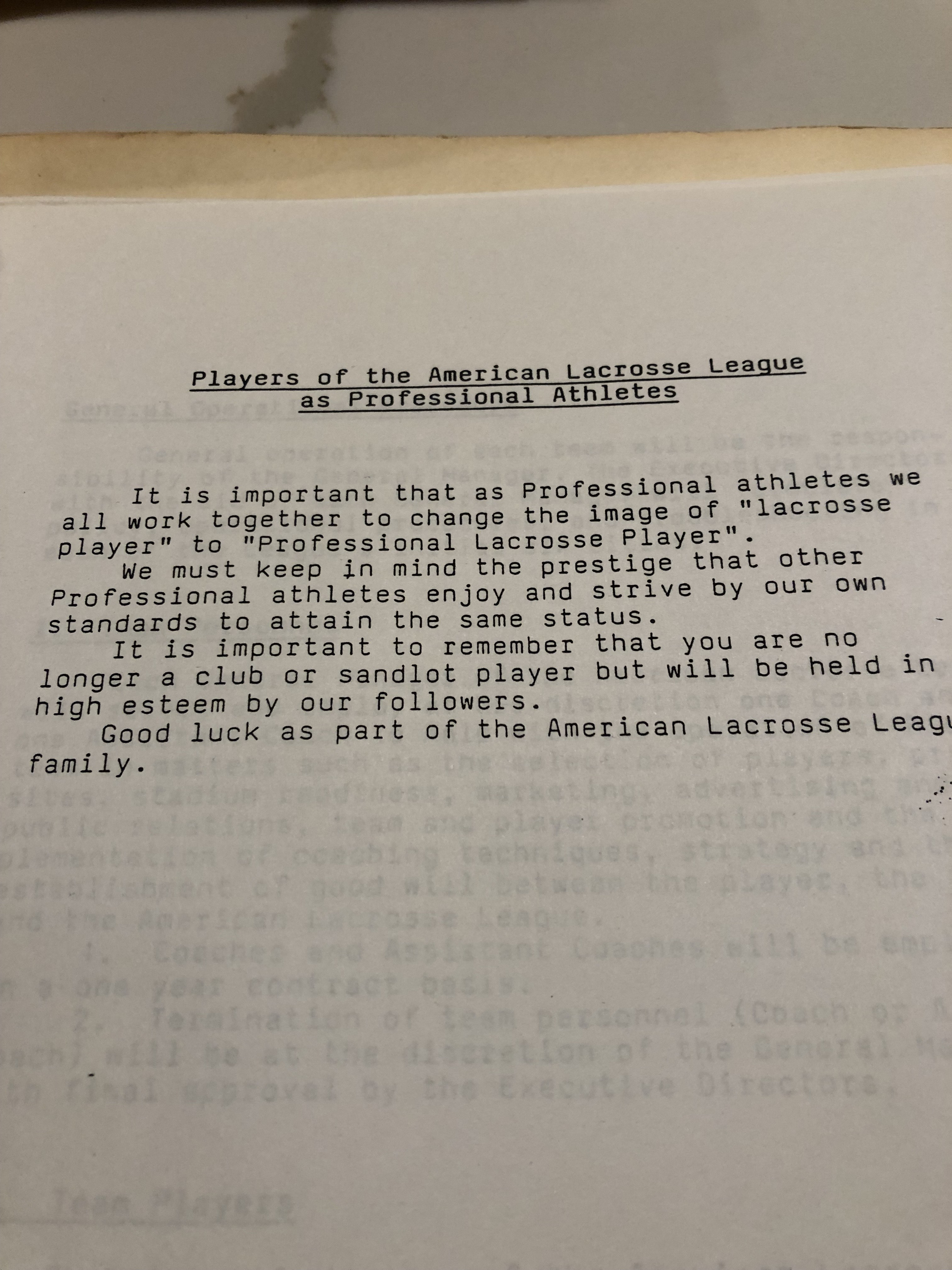

ALL Info Handout

The ALL announced a 10-game cable TV package deal with the FNN/MSG (Madison Square Garden network), which reached at the time over 32 million television homes. As it turned out, no drug testing was ever performed on players or included in any of the player contracts. In addition, the concept of a "family atmosphere" was also a fiction as Denver Rifles co-Captain, Steve Bevelle, overheard the League owners instructing the referees in confidence prior to the first game in Boston to "put away the whistles and let the men play." The clear inference was to let the games indeed turn into the WWE but with sticks and helmets.

The League announced a six-team league with each team playing 15 games. Teams were set in Boston, Baltimore, Syracuse, New Jersey, Long Island, and Denver. The league attracted some of the lacrosse players including USA World team members and US Lacrosse Hall of Fame inductees such as Brook Sweet (University of Massachusetts), Brad Kotz (Syracuse University), Brian Wood (Johns Hopkins University), Bill Bergan (Hobart College), Tim Schurr (Washington & Lee University), Peter Scott (Johns Hopkins), Mark Moore (Hobart College), Steve Beville (Washington College), Gerry Byrne (University of Massachusetts), Zack Colburn (UPenn), Todd Curry (Syracuse University), Michael Burnett (UNC), John Nostrant (Washington College), Kevin Martin (Hobart College), Dan Pratt (Syracuse University), Mark Burnham (Syracuse University), Travis Solomon (Syracuse University), Greg Tarbell (Syracuse University) and Tom Rosa (Hobart College). Eighty percent of the players were All-Americans in college. Baltimore attackman, US Lacrosse Hall of Fame inductee Brooks Sweet stated "Every game is going to be like Hopkins vs. Hopkins. I was skeptical at first, but when I saw the caliber of players in the league, I was impressed."

For the most part, players were assigned to teams on a regional basis to increase fan loyalty stemming from their college experiences. The Syracuse team was made up of mostly Syracuse University and Hobart College players; The Boston team made up of University of Massachusetts and Brown University players; the Baltimore team consisted of Johns Hopkins, University of North Carolina and Loyola University athletes; the Denver Rifles had players hailing from The University of Colorado, Colorado State University and Colorado College etc. Players were signed to uniform two-year contracts that paid $4,800 the first year and $6,000 in 1989. At that same time the MILL (the indoor league) was still paying its players $100 per game. The first player officially signed by the league was Greg Fisk, an All-American Midfield hailing from the University of Massachusetts and signed to the Boston Militia.

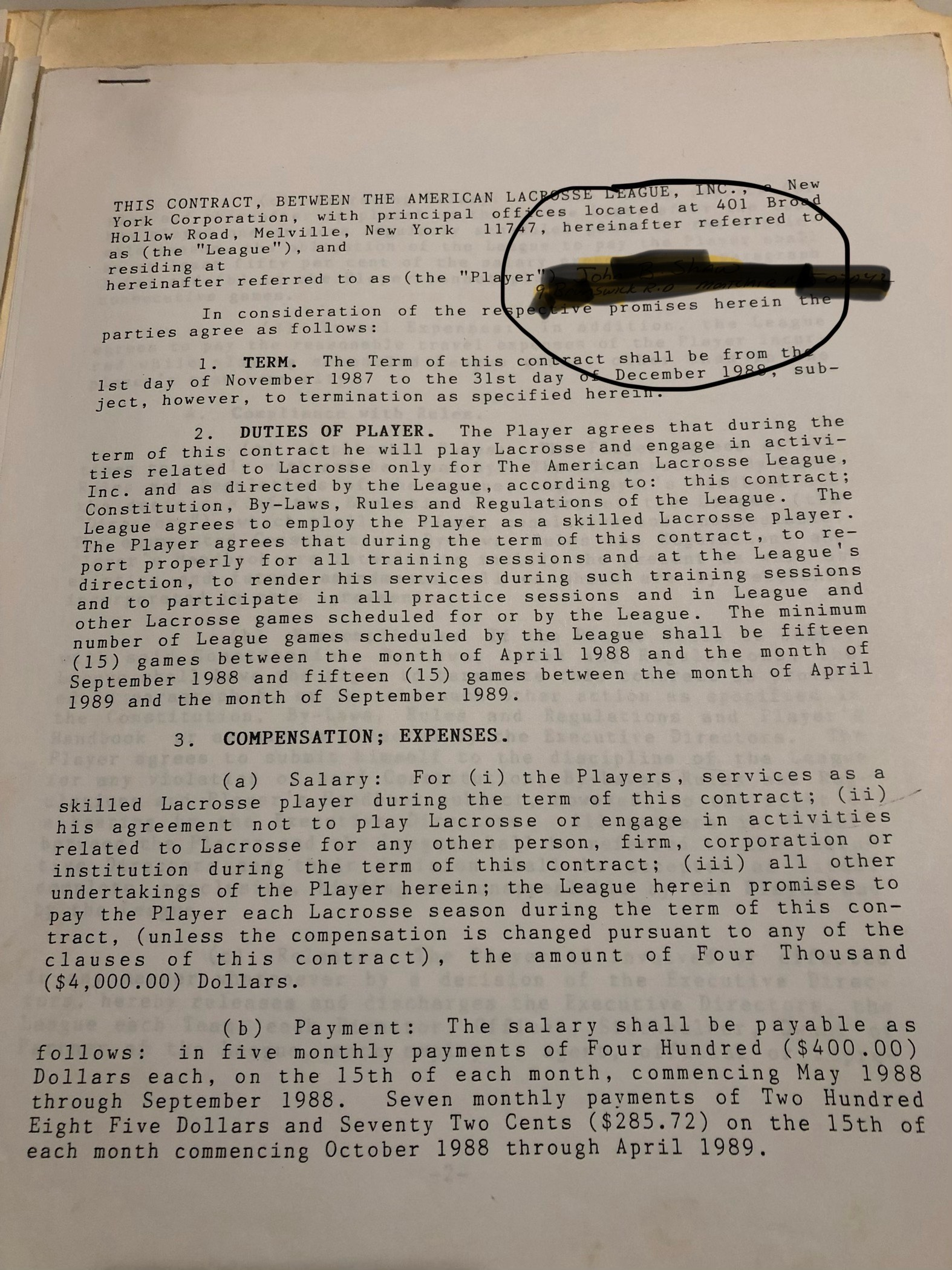

The league was a forerunner in introducing new rules for the sport of lacrosse, some of which are still in vogue today. The goal was to increase the pace of play, create more offense and make the games more exciting. These rules included a 25-second shot clock, allowing only three long poles permitted on the field at any one time (the college rules allowed five at that time), unlimited on the fly substitutions (i.e. no horns like in college), and delayed penalties on fast breaks.

== The season ==
The 1988 inaugural season of the ALL kicked off with three Sunday afternoon tilts on April 24, 1988. Syracuse traveled to Long Island and the turf at Hofstra University to play the Sachems (https://www.youtube.com/watch?v=uEEdUOY2M4o&t=356s), Denver flew into Boston to face the Militia at Tufts University and The Baltimore Tribe ventured up I-95 to square off with the New Jersey Arrows.

The league faced problems with the lack of attendance. Only 600 paying fans attended the New Jersey game and the following week in the hot bed of lacrosse, Baltimore, only 500 fans attended the match. The Tribes' second home game drew a smaller crowd of 300 fans. Some games drew higher turnout, such as Denver, where 2,700 patrons attended the Rifles victory over New Jersey.

By May 19, teams had played four games. However, it became apparent that the owners had misstated the amount of capital they had invested. Baltimore player checks bounced and then their General Manager abruptly resigned. Games started being postponed and the Rifles suspended operations.

As the league floundered, a few of the Long Island players encouraged Wallace and Meierdiericks to meet them in person at the bank in Long Island to pay their salaries under threat of major slashing penalties and they did.

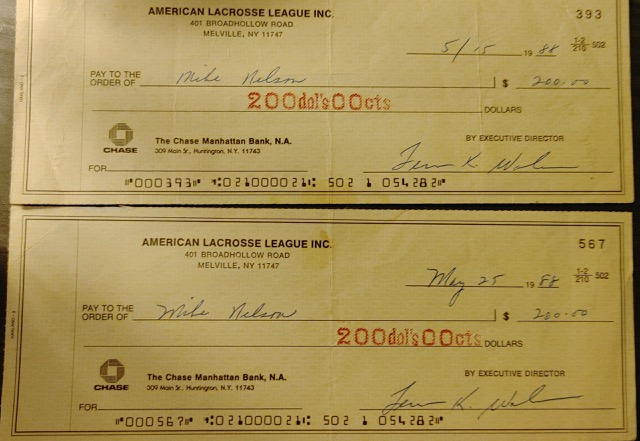

The most definitive piece written on the league was penned by Steve Holroyd in crossecheck.com/2019/03/17/american-lacrosse-league-1988/#_edn1 The American Lacrosse League.

== The teams ==
=== Baltimore Tribe ===
The Baltimore Tribe was an original six member of the American Lacrosse League, a short lived professional lacrosse league in 1988, that was based in Catonsville, Maryland. The Tribe played their home games at the University of Maryland, Baltimore County. The original General Manager was Bob Griebe. Mark Glagola replaced Griebe, who resigned c. May 14, 1988. Frank Messanotte was the head coach. Brooks Sweet and Brian Wood played for the Tribe. Other players were Peter and Brent Voelkel, Chris Walker, Brad Kotz, Todd Curry and goalie Gavin Moag. The team colors were Carolina Blue and White. The Tribe had a 2–2 record when the league folded.

==== Baltimore Tribe roster ====
Jersey number	Name	College	Position
3	Michael Burnett	University of North Carolina North Carolina Tar Heels men's lacrosse	Attack
4	Brent Voelkel	University of North Carolina	Attack
5	John Nostrant	(Washington College)	Midfield
7	Mickey Matthews	(Brown University)	Attack/Mid
9	Brooks Sweet	(University of Massachusetts)	Attack
13	Bobby Powers	(Towson University)	Midfield
14	Leo Paytas	(University of Pennsylvania)Penn Quakers men's lacrosse	Attack
15	Brian Wood	(Johns Hopkins University) Johns Hopkins Blue Jays men's lacrosse	Attack
16	Todd Curry	(Syracuse University)	Midfield
17	Pete Hanlon	(Towson University)	Defense
18	Chris Walker	University of North Carolina	Defense
19	Wayne McPartland	(Loyola University)	Defense
20	Steve Mutscheller	University of North Carolina	Midfield
21	Gavin Moag	(Towson University)	Goalie
22	Chris D. Walker	(University of Virginia)	Defense
23	Kevin Mahon	(Johns Hopkins University) Johns Hopkins Blue Jays men's lacrosse	Goalie
24	Peter Voelkel	University of North Carolina	Midfield
25	Brian Jackson	University of Maryland	Defense
27	Tony Olmert	University of Maryland	Midfield
28	Neal Barthelme	(Loyola University)	Midfield
29	Zack Colburn	University of Pennsylvania Penn Quakers men's lacrosse	Defense
30	Brad Kotz	(Syracuse University) Syracuse Orange Brad Kotz	Midfield

The general manager of the Tribe was Bob Griebe and the head coach was Frank Mezzandotte.

=== Boston Militia ===
The Boston Militia was an outdoor lacrosse team in the short lived American Lacrosse League formed in 1988. The Militia played their home games at Ellis Oval on the campus of Tufts University. The general manager for the Militia was Chris Harvey and the head coach was David Hill. The Militia compiled a record of two wins and two losses before the American Lacrosse league ceased operation due to financial difficulties. Some of the Militia's notable players were Barry Fraser, Bruce Chanenchuk and goalie Dan O'Neill.

==== Boston Militia roster ====
Jersey number	Name	College	Position
4	Steve Glover	University of New Hampshire	Attack
7	John Gower	Ohio Wesleyan University	Mid
9	Greg Fisk	University of Massachusetts	Mid
10	Steve Giatrelis	University of New Hampshire	Attack/Mid
12	Bill Bergan	Hobart College	Mid
13	Bruce Chanenchuck	Johns Hopkins University	Mid
14	Tom Gagnon	Brown University	Attack
15	Tom Carmean	University of Massachusetts	Attack
16	Greg Canella	University of Massachusetts	Attack
17	Dave Desko	Syracuse University	Mid
18	Karl Hatton	University of Massachusetts	Mid
19	Steve Heffernan	Brown University	Mid
20	Paul Fogarty	University of Massachusetts	Mid
21	Barry Cain	University of Massachusetts	Defense
22	Tim Schurr	Washington & Lee	Defense
23	John Fenton	Brown University	Defense
24	Ray Cozzi	University of Massachusetts	Defense
25	Micahel Higgins	Cornell University	Defense
26	Andy Soma	University of New Hampshire	Goalie
27	Todd Francis	Cornell University	Defense
28	Jeff Hacker	Brown University	Mid
29	Dan O'Neil	Ohio Wesleyan	Goalie
30	Barry Fraser	University of New Hampshire	Attack

The general manager of the Militia was Chris Harvey and the head coach was David Hill.

=== Denver Rifles ===
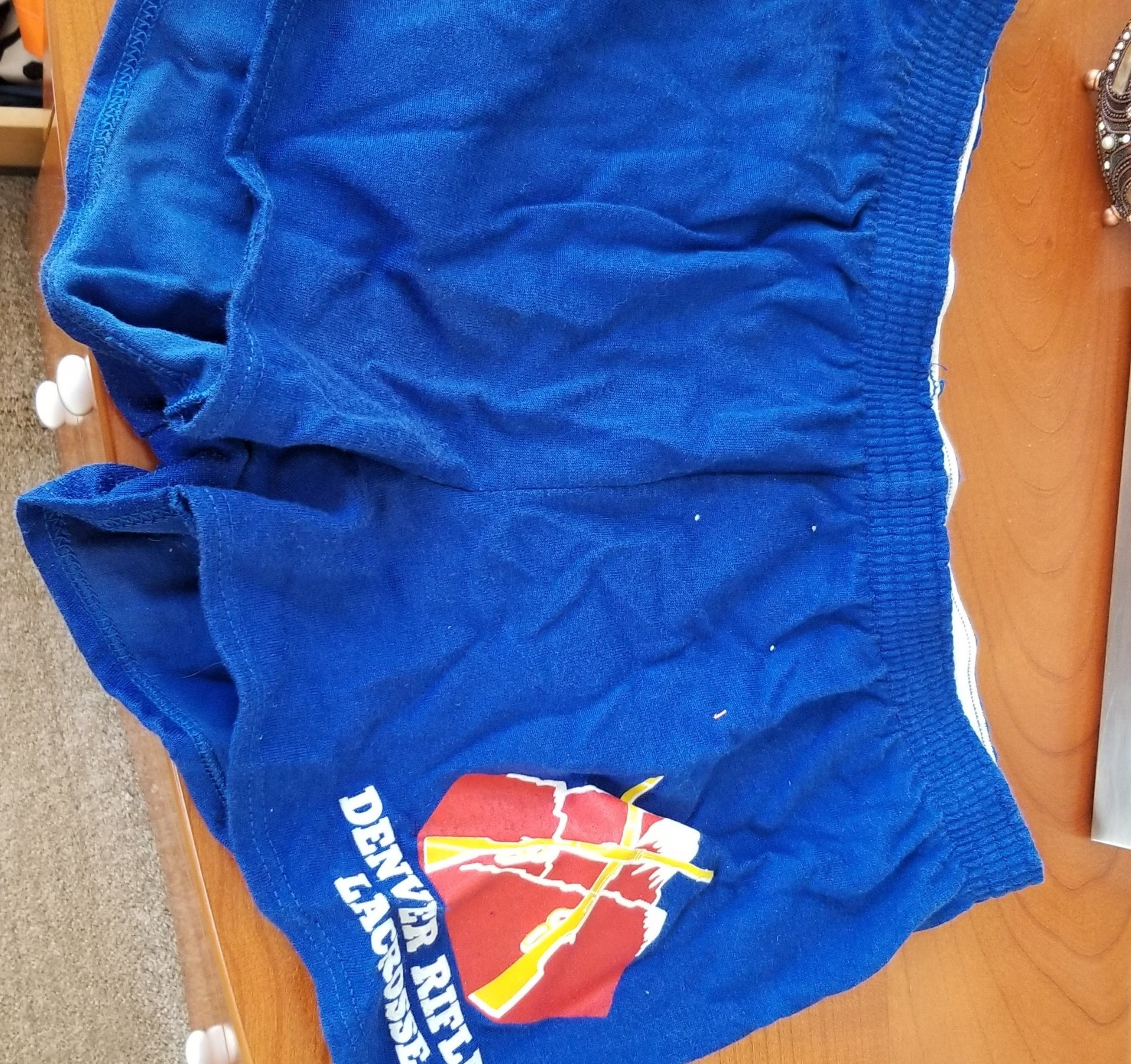
Denver Rifles 1988 game shorts

The Denver Rifles were one of the six original members of the American Lacrosse League. They were the only team west of the Mississippi river and not located in a traditional lacrosse hotbed market. The team is credited by multiple local Colorado lacrosse players and coaches along with the Vail Lacrosse shootout for jump starting the growth of lacrosse in the Rocky Mountains to where it is now a vibrant lacrosse community. Peter Scott, an All-American attackman, from Johns Hopkins University was the first player inked to a contract by the club's General Manager Jon Bock, who himself was an All-Ivy player and assistant coach at the University of Pennsylvania and head coach at the University of Denver. Local coaching legend, Jon Barocas (a Hall of Fame High school coach from East High school in Denver who is in the Coaches Hall of fame) served as the team's assistant General manager. Barocas was credited with garnering multiple marketing opportunities for the team and its players. The legendary player Dave Devine (from Cornell University and a member of the USA World Lacrosse team) served as the team's Head Coach. The team practiced during the pre-season in the famed City Park of Denver causing many patrons to wonder what men with sticks were doing running around with the ducks and the geese. The Rifles would eventually lead the league in attendance during the regular season due to the efforts of Bock and Barocas. The team colors were Red with white and blue trim. The Jerseys were red with royal blue shorts.

==== Denver Rifles roster ====
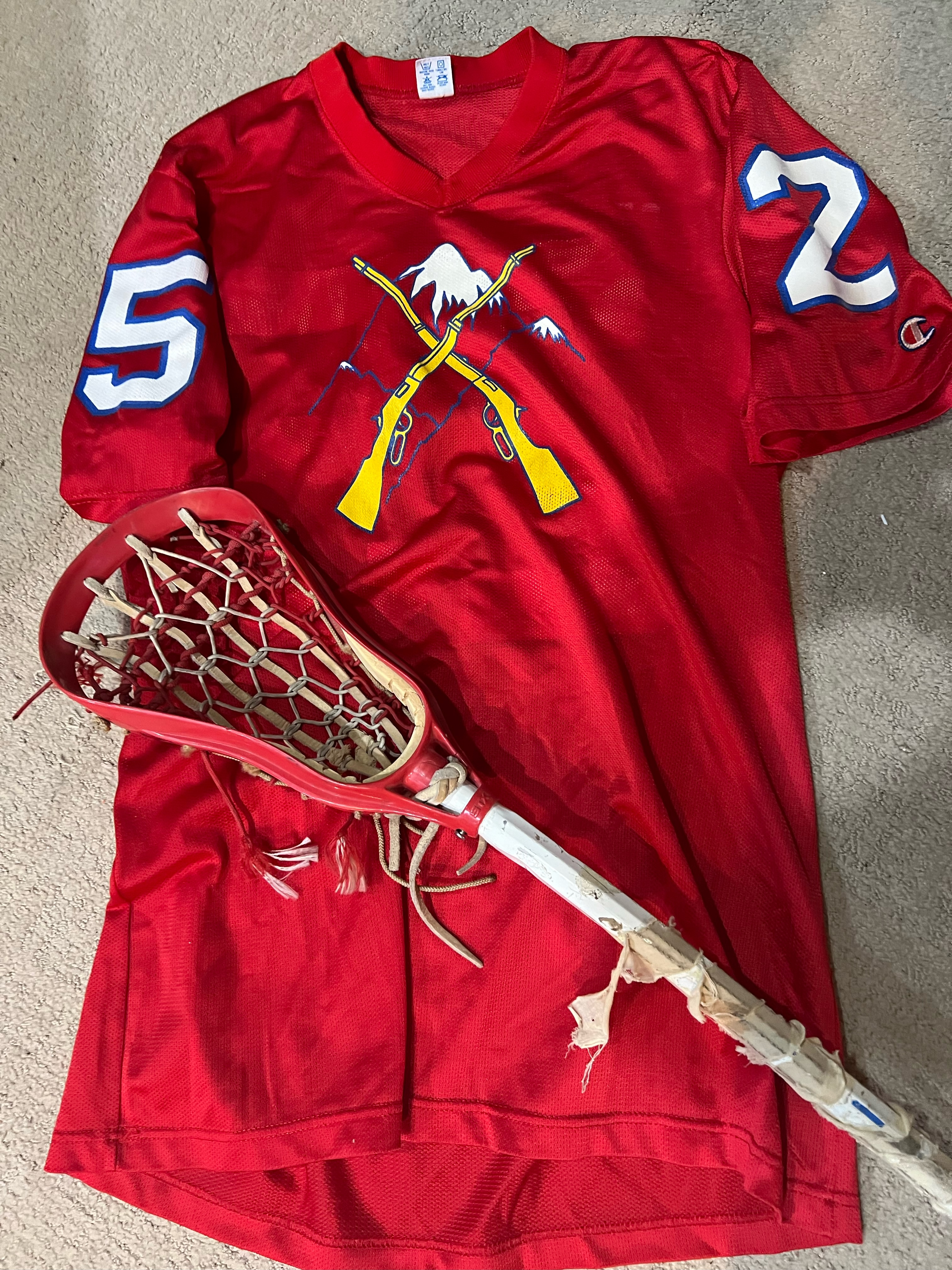

Name	College	Position	Jersey number
Peter Scott	Johns Hopkins University Johns Hopkins Blue Jays men's lacrosse	Attack	3
Terry Claasen	Colorado College	Midfield	4
Brian Salazar	University of Colorado	FOGO/Midfield	5
Sam Hovey	St. Lawrence University	Attack	6
Mark Branigan	Syracuse University Syracuse Orange	Midfield	9
Danny Cisneros	Bowdoin College	Goalie	12
Ray Stoughton	Roanoke College	Attack	15
Tim Kisielnicki	UMBC	Midfield	17
Sam Carpenter	Middlebury College	Defense	18
Jim Guthrie	Roanoke College	Midfield	19
Randy Cox	University of North Carolina	Defense	20
Rick Parietti	Colorado State University	Midfield	21
David Traylor	University of Colorado	Midfield	22
Jim Hannon	Hobart College	Defense	23
Chris Rossi	Syracuse University Syracuse Orange	Midfield	24
Peter Schaffer	Franklin and Marshall College	Midfield	25
Dave DiSciorio	Rutgers University	Midfield	26
Steve Beville	Washington College	Defense	27
Dan Schaffer	UMBC	Goalie	29
Paul Fazzini	Kutztown University of Pennsylvania	Defense	30

=== New Jersey Arrows ===
==== New Jersey Arrows roster ====
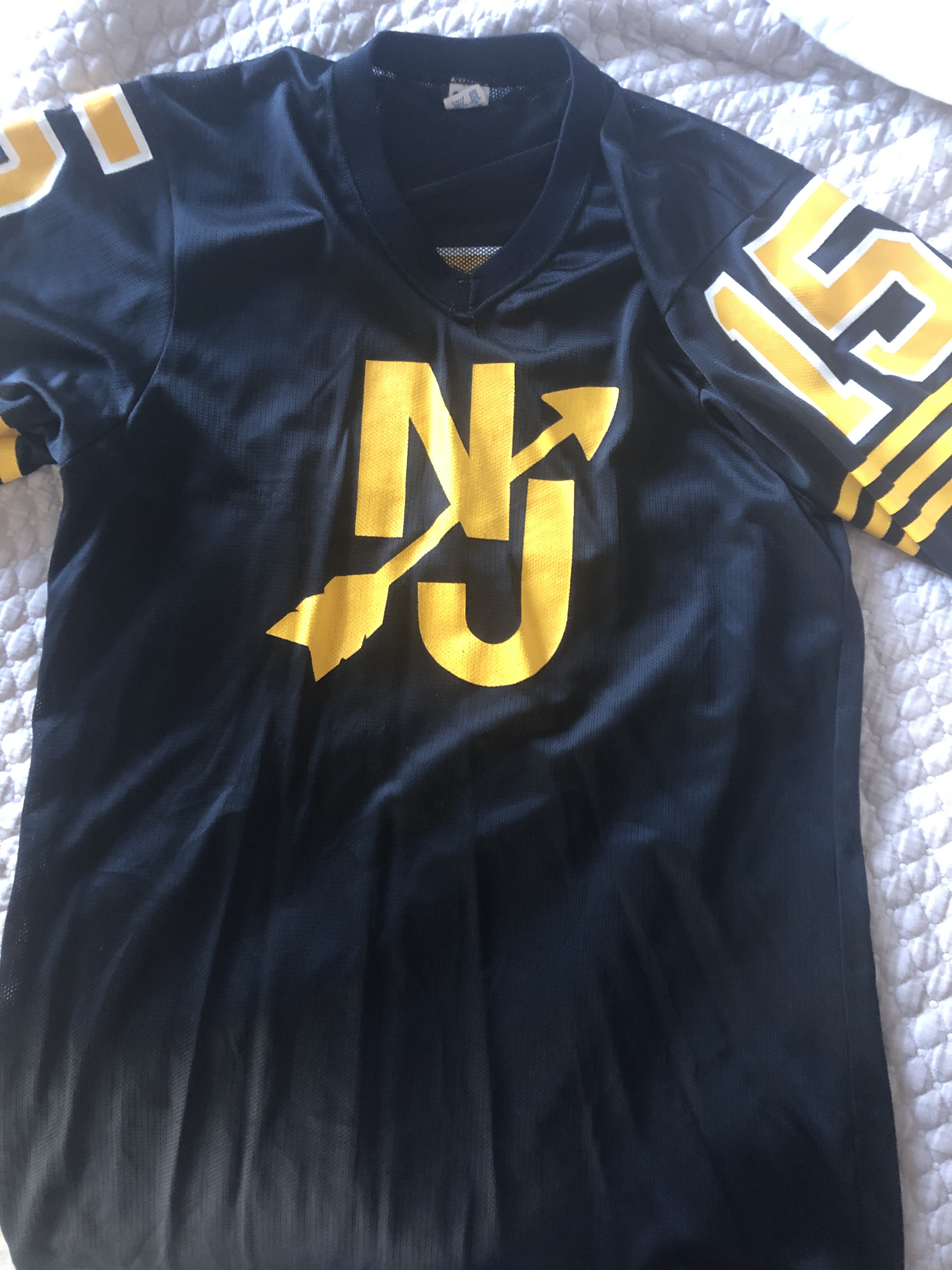

Name	College	Position	Jersey number
Pat Tierney	Loyola University	Attack	3
Jack Francis	University of Maryland	Midfield	7
Bob Cummings	Cornell University	Midfield	9
John Keough	Brown University	Attack	10
Mark Moore	Hobart College	Midfield	11
Dave Sherwood	Loyola University	Midfield	13
Ed Trabulsy	Rutgers University	Attack	14
John Shaw	Roanoke College	Midfield	15
Dan Whelan	Hobart College	Defense	18
Pat O'Hara	Hobart College	Midfield	19
Scott Lohan	Brown University	Goalie	20
Tom Grimaldi	Hobart College	Midfield	21
Steve Mitchell	Johns Hopkins University	Defense/LSM	22
John Shoemaker	University of Pennsylvania	attack	23
Tom Gundersen	Cornell University	Midfield	24
Tom Corcoran	Harvard University	Midfield	25
Mike Webster	Johns Hopkins University	Defense	26
Bill Hall	Denison College	Goalie	27
Ricky Lewis	Rutgers University	Goalie	28
Gerry Byrne	Harvard University	Defense	29
Devin Arkinson	Hobart College	Defense	30

=== Syracuse Spirit ===
==== Syracuse Spirit roster ====
Name	College	Position
Marc Van Arsdale	Hobart College	Attack
Mark Burnham	Syracuse University Syracuse Orange	Midfield
Jeff Desko	Syracuse University Syracuse Orange	Defense
Pat Donahue	Syracuse University Syracuse Orange	Midfield
David Paige	Hobart College	Midfield
Michael Guy	Hobart College	Midfield
Greg Hill	SUNY Cortland	Defense
Eric Jeschke	Syracuse University Syracuse Orange	Midfield
Tom Korrie	Syracuse University Syracuse Orange	Attack
Nick Lanuth	Cornell University	Attack
Jeff Long	Naval academy	Attack
Bob Lukacs	university of Baltimore	Midfield
Randy Lundblad	Syracuse University Syracuse Orange	Attack
Kevin Martin	Hobart College	Defense
Jeff Mckee	Syracuse University Syracuse Orange	Defense
Tom Nelson	Syracuse University Syracuse Orange	Attack
Mike Perkins	SUNY Cortland	Attack
Randy Powers	university of Delaware	Attack
Dan Pratt	Syracuse University Syracuse Orange	Defense
Tom Rosa	Hobart College	Midfield
Kevin Sheehan	Syracuse University Syracuse Orange	Defense
Travis Solomon	Syracuse University Syracuse Orange	Goalie
Greg Tarbell	Syracuse University	Attack
Chuck Warren	Hobart College	Goalie

== Final 1988 ALL standings ==
Team	W	L	PCT	GB	GF	GA
Syracuse Spirit	4	1	.800	--	95	73
Long Island Sachems	3	1	.750	0.5	63	58
Baltimore Tribe	2	2	.500	1.5	63	55
Boston Militia	2	2	.500	1.5	60	60
Denver Rifles	2	2	.500	1.5	52	61
New Jersey Arrows	0	5	.000	4	64	90

== Schedule and results ==
=== April 24 ===
- Syracuse 13 @ Long Island 17
- Baltimore W 17 @ New Jersey L 10, Attendance 600
- Denver W 14 @ Boston L 13

Goals Boston Steve Glover 4, Barry Fraser 3, Steve Gistrelis 2, Todd Francis, Greg Canella, Bill Bergan, Tom Gagnon; Denver Sam Hovey 3, Peter Scott3, Chris Rossi 2, Jim Guthrie, Dave Traylor, Rick Parietti, Terry Claasen, Dave DiSciorio, Ray Stoughton. Assists Boston Steve Heffernan 2, Jeff Hacker 2, Dave Desko 2, Golver, Fraser, Fisk; Denver Hover 3, Scott 2, Tim Kisielnicki. Saves Boston Andy Soma 9 Denver Danny Cisneros 24.

=== May 1 ===
  - Syracuse 17 @ New Jersey 15
  - Boston 14 @ Baltimore 11 Attendance 500
  - Denver 13 @ Long Island 14

=== May 8 ===
  - Syracuse 19 @ Baltimore 13 Attendance 300
  - New Jersey 12 @ Denver 13 OT Attendance 2,700

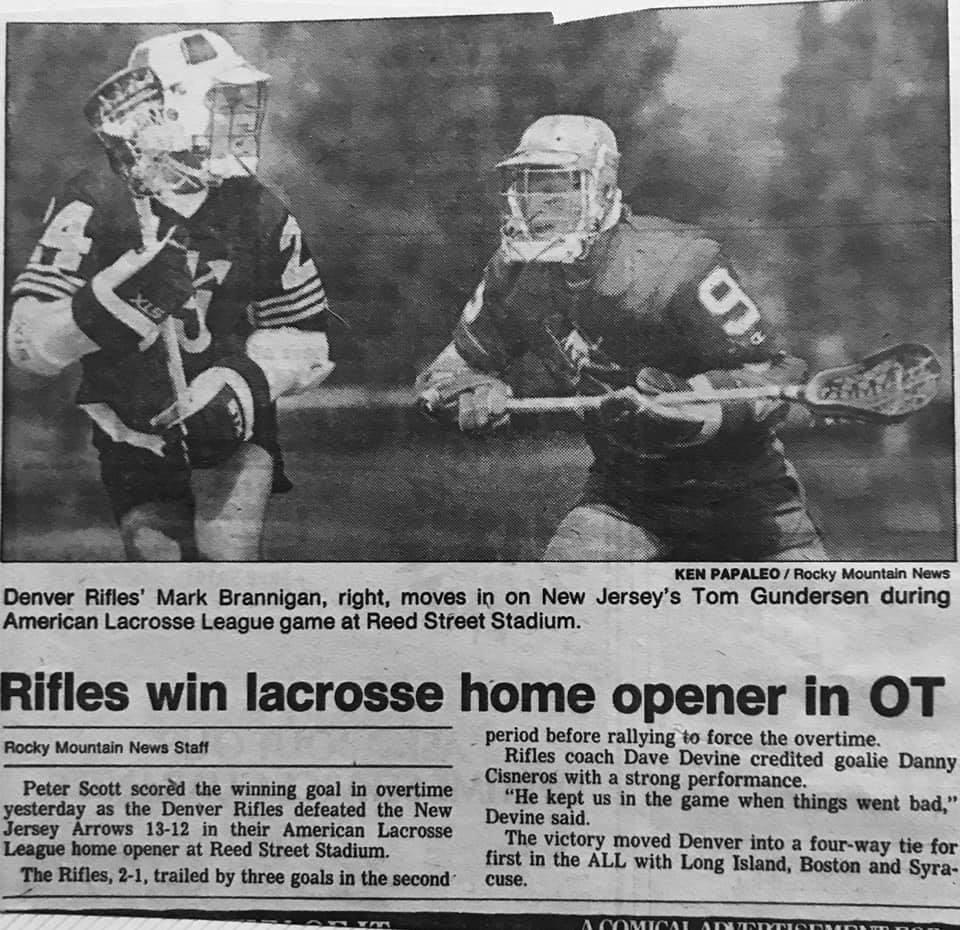

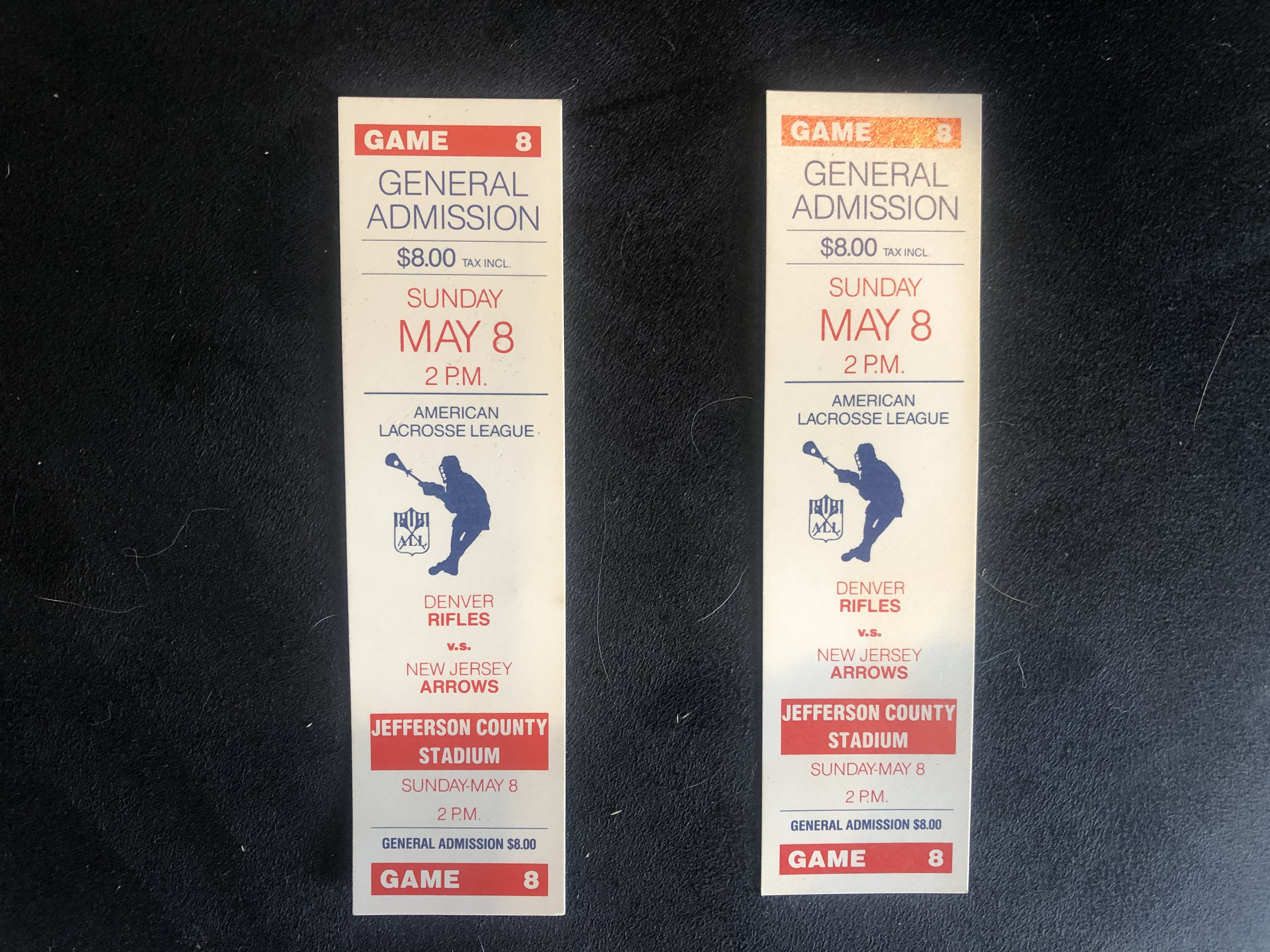

Scoring

1st Quarter

1. NJ Trabuksy (Keough), 14:07 (Man up)

2. NJ Keough (Moore) 13:13 (Man Up)

3. Denver Parietti, 10:06

4. NJ Trabuksy (Grimaldi), 7:45

5. Denver Claasen, 6:11

6. NJ Moore (Gundersen) 5:42

2nd Quarter

7. Denver Claasen 13:56 (man up)

8. Denver Kisielnicki, 9:42

9. NJ Trobulsy (Keough) 8:41 (man up)

10. Denver Scott (Hoovey) 7:32

11. NJ Gundersen (Moore) 6:08

12. Denver Stoughton (Rossie) 2:35

13. Denver Rossi 1:49

3rd Quarter

14. NJ Gundersen 8:30

15. Denver Stoughton 7:38

16. NJ Gundersen 6:22

17. Denver Guthrie (Rossi) 4:11

18. Denver Claasen :34

4th Quarter

19. Denver Hovey (Kisienicki) 9:35

20. NJ Sherwood (Trabulsy) 7:19 (Man up)

21. NJ Keough (Moore) 6:23

22. NJ Sherwood (Trabulsy) 5:46 (Man up)

23. NJ Grimaldi (Corcoran) 4:05

24. Denver Parietti (Branigan) 2:11 (man up)

Overtime

25. Scott, 2:26

Shots NJ 49, Denver 50

Saves NJ Hall, Lohan (18 saves); Denver Cisneros (24 Saves)

Man up NJ 5 of 8; Denver 2 of 4

Attendance 2,632

  - Long Island 15 @ Boston 18

[[ thumb ]]

== *May 15 ==
- Boston 15 @ Syracuse 20
- Denver 12 @ Baltimore 22

- Scoring - First Half

1. Balt M. Mathews (J. Nostrant) 2. Balt B. Sweet (M. Mathews) 3. Balt M. Mathews 4. Balt M. Burnett (B. Kotz) EM 5. Balt G. Moag (M. Mathews) 6. Den P. Scott 7. Balt B. Voekel 8. Balt N. Bathelemue 9. Balt B. Kotz (B. Wood) 10. Balt B. Sweet (M. Mathews) 11. Balt B. Sweet 12. Balt P. Voekel (L. Paytas) 13. Den D. DiSciorio (T. Claasen) 14. Balt M. Burnett (Sweet) 15. Den T. Claasen 16. Den C. Rossi - EM

  - Second Half

17. Balt M. Burnett 18. Balt B. Voekel (J. Nostrant) 19. Balt B. Voekel 20. Den S. Hovey (P. Scott) 21. Balt B. Kotz (M. Burnett) EM 22. Balt L. Paytas (B Kotz) 23. Den M. Branigan 24. Den S. Hovey (M. Branigan) EM 25. Balt M. Mathews (B. Wood) EM 26. Balt B. Voekel (B. Kotz) 27. Den D. DiSciorio 28. Den C. Rossi (Hovey) EM 29. Den P. Schaffer (Hovey) 30. Balt B. Kotz 31. Balt M. Burnett 32. Den P. Schaffer 33. Balt P. Voekel (M. Burnett) 34. Den P. Scott (D. DiSciorio) EM 35. Den P. Scott (S. Hovey)

  - Player Scoring
- Baltimore M. Mathews (3G, 3A) B. Sweet (3G, 1A) J. Nostrant (2A) B. Kotz (3G, 3A) M. Burnett (4G, 3A) L. Paytas (1G, 1A) B. Wood (2A) P. Voekel (1G) B. Voekel (5G) G. Moag (1G), N. Bathelemue (1G)
- Denver P. Scott (3G, 1A) T. Claasen (1G, 1A) C. Rossi D. (2G) Disciorio (2G, 1A) P. Schaffer (2G) S. Hovey M. (2G, 2A) Branigan (1G, 1A)

Shots Balt 37, 22 49 Den 16, 27 43

Saves Balt (Mahon) 7, 15 22 Denver Cisneros 14, 1 15 Schaffer, D 8

Face Offs Balt 10, 10 20 Den 9, 9 18

- Man Up Balt 12 Penalties 3 goals, Denver 7 Penalties 2 goals
  - New Jersey 14 @ Long Island 17

*May 18

  - Denver Rifles fold. League owner, Wallace cited the cost of operating a western team was the main reason for the Rifles' demise even though the Rifles led the league in attendance through the first four games of the season.

== *May 21 ==
  - New Jersey 13 @ Syracuse 26
    - Game moved to Saturday due to Syracuse University home game on May 22
- May 22
  - Denver @ Syracuse
    - Game not played because Denver folded
  - Long Island @ Baltimore
    - Game moved to May 21 due to Johns Hopkins home game, then cancelled due to competition from Preakness
  - Boston @ New Jersey
    - New Jersey played Syracuse on May 21 due to graduation at Montclair State, New Jersey's home field

Newspapers about ALL (link below): American Lacrosse League - Newspapers.com

Search: "American Lacrosse League Baltimore @ Denver May 15th, 1988" on YouTube for an ALL game. Also search YouTube for the American Lacrosse League Television ad 1998.
