= GAY.tv =

- Country: Italy
- Broadcast area: Italy
- Headquarters: Milan, Italy

Programming
- Language: Italian
- Picture format: 576i (4:3 SDTV)

History
- Launched: 13 May 2002; 23 years ago
- Closed: 18 December 2008; 17 years ago

Links
- Website: www.gay.tv

GAY.tv was an Italian television channel with LGBTQ-themed programming aimed at LGBTQ audiences and beyond. It operated between 2002 and 18 December 2008, when it was shut down due to low revenue, with all activity focused on its website instead. The website would also cease its activity without warning in late 2015.

The channel broadcast films, music, and entertainment shows, amongst other genres. Some of the most popular GAY.tv originals were the talk show Quantestorie, which was presented by Luca Zanforlin, A letto con La Pina, another talk show presented by Italian rapper La Pina, and Pink, a game show focused on gossip and presented by Fabio Canino.

The channel was the only one in Italy to broadcast the Eurovision Song Contest while Italian national broadcaster RAI, which had previously been responsible for the country's participation in the contest, was on a participation hiatus between 1997 and 2011; it aired the 2003 contest, with Fabio Canino and Paolo Quilici providing commentary.
