= Syracuse railway station =

Syracuse railway station, or Syracuse station, may refer to:

- Siracusa railway station, in Syracuse, Sicily, Italy
- Syracuse station (Delaware, Lackawanna and Western Railroad), a former railroad station in Syracuse, New York
- Syracuse station (New York Central Railroad), a former railroad station in Syracuse, New York
- William F. Walsh Regional Transportation Center, an intermodal passenger station in Syracuse, New York

== See also ==
- Syracuse (disambiguation)
