= Tancred, Count of Syracuse =

Norman nobleman in Sicily

Tancred (fl. 1104) was the Count of Syracuse and a member of the Hauteville family. He was appointed by his relative Roger I of Sicily to govern one of the first and only feudal counties created in Sicily after the Norman conquest. His predecessor was Roger's son, Jordan. His descendant, Simon, still ruled Syracuse in the middle of the twelfth century.
