= Siege of Syracuse =

The city of Syracuse has been besieged many times in history. Siege of Syracuse may refer to:

== The Athenians ==
- Siege of Syracuse (415–413 BC), during the Sicilian Expedition

== Carthage ==
- Siege of Syracuse (397 BC)
- Siege of Syracuse (343 BC)
- Siege of Syracuse (311–309 BC)
- Siege of Syracuse (278 BC)

== Roman Republic ==
- Siege of Syracuse (213–212 BC), during the Second Punic War against Carthage

== Aghlabid Dynasty ==
- Siege of Syracuse (827–828)
- Siege of Syracuse (868)
- Siege of Syracuse (877–878)

== Byzantine Empire ==
- Siege of Syracuse (1040), by George Maniakes

== The Normans ==
- Siege of Syracuse (1086)

== War of the Vespers ==
- Siege of Syracuse (1298), part of the Angevin invasion of Sicily
- Siege of Syracuse (1300), part of the Angevin invasion of Sicily

== See also ==
- Siege of Syracuse (film)
- Battle of Syracuse (disambiguation)
- Syracuse (disambiguation)
