= Siege of Taormina (1078) =

Siege in Sicily

- Part of the Norman conquest of southern Italy
| Date | 1078 |
| Location | Taormina, Val Demone, Sicily 37°51′N 15°18′E |
| Result | Norman victory |

Belligerents
| Roger I of Sicily | Emirate of Sicily |

Commanders and leaders
| Otto the Aleramid; Jordan of Hauteville; Arisgot du Pucheuil; Elias Cartomensis | |
- Location within Sicily Siege of Taormina (1078) (Italy)

The siege of Taormina in 1078 was one of the final acts in the Norman conquest of Sicily.

== History ==
The Norman Count of Sicily, Roger I, after storming Castronovo, turned to the conquest of the Val Demone region. The Normans laid siege to Taormina by constructing 22 wooden forts around it in circumvallation. The Norman army divided into four contingents, commanded by Otto the Aleramid, probably the uncle of Adelaide del Vasto, the illegitimate son of the Count, Jordan, the Norman Arisgot du Pucheuil, and Elias Cartomensis, a Muslim from Cártama who converted to Christianity. Nevertheless, the Arabs resisted for some time, before capitulating.

== See also ==
- Norman–Arab–Byzantine culture
