= Benavert =

Last Emir of Sicily

Ibn ‘Abbād, also known as Benavert, was the last Emir of Sicily. He was the Emir of Syracuse and, from 1072 to 1086, led the last Arab resistance against the Normans, who were conquering Sicily.

In 1075 he defeated Jordan of Hauteville, the son of Grand Count Roger I, at Catania, and he reconquered the city in 1081. In 1085 he led some expeditions to Reggio, in Calabria. On 25 May 1086, while Roger I was besieging Syracuse, he fell into the sea while jumping from one boat to the other, and died because of his heavy armor. In 1091, His wife and his son fled to the city of Noto, which, along with Butera also fell.

One of his descendants, Muhammad ibn ‘Abbād, rebelled to Frederick of Sicily at the start of the 13th century, dying during the rebellion.

== See also ==
- Abbadid dynasty, rulers of the Taifa of Seville (1023-1095).
