= Simon, Count of Syracuse =

Simon (fl. 1162) was the Norman Count of Syracuse and a member of the Hauteville family. He may be an illegitimate son of Roger II of Sicily, but more likely a son of Henry, Count of Paterno, the brother-in-law of Roger I. He was probably a descendant of his predecessor Tancred.

In 1162, when Frederick Barbarossa was seeking allies for a planned invasion of the Kingdom of Sicily, he made a treaty with the Republic of Genoa, offering them the entire Ligurian coast and the lands of Simon in Sicily. These lands included the cities of Syracuse and Noto and 250 knight's fees (caballariae) in the fertile plain around Noto, the Val di Noto. When the Emperor Henry VI reissued his father's charter to Genoa on 30 May 1191, he retained the promise of Simon's lands, even though Simon was by then dead.
