= Luca Zanforlin =

Italian television presenter (born 1965)

Luca Zanforlin (born March 4, 1965) is an Italian television presenter.

== Biography ==
Zanforlin was born in Ferrara. He is the creator and host (with Maria De Filippi) of the talent show Amici di Maria De Filippi (Canale 5).

=== Television ===
- Ore 12 – with Gerry Scotti
- Perdonami – with Davide Mengacci
- Iva Show – with Iva Zanicchi
- Una goccia nel mare – with Mara Venier
- 30 ore per la vita – with Lorella Cuccarini and Marco Columbro
- Il brutto anatroccolo – with Amanda Lear
- Meteore – with Gene Gnocchi
- Bigodini
- Tempo di Musica
- Un'italiana per Miss Universo – with Elenoire Casalegno
- Super – with Elenoire Casalegno
- Testarda io – with Iva Zanicchi
- Popstars
- Quantestorie
- Amici di Maria De Filippi
- Nokia Amici in Tour

=== Books ===
- A un passo dal sogno. Il romanzo di Amici, Segrate, Arnoldo Mondadori Editore, 2007.
- Fra il cuore e le stelle, Segrate, Arnoldo Mondadori Editore, 2008.
- Vola via con me. Il nuovo romanzo di Amici, Segrate, Arnoldo Mondadori Editore, 2009.
- Testa o cuore. Il romanzo di Amici, Segrate, Arnoldo Mondadori Editore, 2011.
- Denise la cozza, Segrate, Arnoldo Mondadori Editore, 2011.
- Molto più che Amici, Segrate, Arnoldo Mondadori Editore, 2012.
- Se ci credi davvero, Segrate, Arnaldo Mondadori Editore, 2013.

== See also ==
- Maria De Filippi
- Mediaset
- Telecinco
