= Syracuse Elementary School =

Syracuse Elementary School may refer to:

- Syracuse Elementary School (Syracuse, Indiana), a school in Syracuse, Indiana
- Syracuse Elementary School (Syracuse, Kansas), a school in Syracuse, Kansas
- Syracuse Elementary School (Unadilla, Nebraska), a school in Syracuse, Nebraska
- Syracuse Elementary School (Syracuse, Utah), a school in the Davis School District of Syracuse, Utah
- East Syracuse Elementary School, Syracuse, New York, a school in the East Syracuse-Minoa Central School District

== See also ==
- Syracuse (disambiguation)
