= Syracuse Spirit =

The Syracuse Spirit was a member of the American Lacrosse League, a short lived professional lacrosse league in 1988, based in Syracuse, New York. The Spirit played their home games at the Griffin Field in Liverpool, New York. The general manager of the Spirit was Tom Scofield and the head coach was Jim Booth.

The Spirit had a 4–1 record when the league folded.

== Results and statistics ==
April 24, 1988
Syracuse 13 @ Long Island 17
Long 3-0, Korrie 3-2, Nelson 3-2, Perkins 3-3, Tarbell 0-1, Guy 1-0
Saves: Solomon 9, Warren 10

May 1, 1988
Syracuse 17 @ New Jersey 15
Long 2-1, Korrie 3-1, Nelson 3-1, van Arsdale 3-2, Perkins 2-0, Lundblad 1-0, Jeschke 1-1 Guy 1-0
Saves: Warren 16

May 8, 1988
Syracuse 19 @ Baltimore 13
Long 3-2, Korrie 7-0, Nelson 1-1, Perkins 3-1, Tarbell 2-0, Rosa 1-0, Desko 1-0, Burnham 1-0, Long 0-3, Lucas 0-1, McKee 0-1
Saves: Warren 17

May 15, 1988
Boston 15 @ Syracuse 20
Rosa 4-0, Korrie 5-2, Nelson 3-3, Perkins 1-0, Long 2-0
Saves: Solomon 21

May 21, 1988
New Jersey 13 @ Syracuse 26
Guy 3-5, Korrie 6-1, Donahue 3-1, Desko 1-0 Saves:

== Roster ==
Name	College	Position
Marc Van Arsdale	Hobart	Attack
Mark Burnham	Syracuse	Midfield
Jeff Desko	Syracuse	Defense
Pat Donahue	Syracuse	Midfield
David Paige	Hobart	Midfield
Michael Guy	Hobart	Midfield
Greg Hill	Cortland	Defense
Eric Jeschke	Syracuse	Midfield
Tom Korrie	Syracuse	Attack
Nick Lanuth	Cornell	Attack
Jeff Long	Navy	Attack
Bob Lukacs	Baltimore	Midfield
Randy Lundblad	Syracuse	Attack
Kevin Martin	Hobart	Defense
Jeff Mckee	Syracuse	Defense
Tim Nelson	Syracuse	Attack
Mike Perkins	Cortland	Attack
Randy Powers	Delaware	Attack
Dan Pratt	Syracuse	Defense
Tom Rosa	Hobart	Midfield
Kevin Sheehan	Syracuse	Defense
Travis Solomon	Syracuse	Goalie
Greg Tarbell	Syracuse	Attack
Chuck Warren	Syracuse	Goalie
