= Peter Schaffer (sports agent) =

American sports agent and lawyer (born 1962)

Peter Schaffer (born 1962) is an American sports agent and lawyer who represents players in the National Football League, Major League Baseball, PGA Tour, the National Basketball Association, the Premier Lacrosse League and the National Hockey League.

== Early life ==
Schaffer was born in 1962, in upstate New York. He attended Cortland High School and then The Hill School, in Pottstown, Pennsylvania on an athletic and academic scholarship, graduating in 1980 with honors. Schaffer then attended Franklin & Marshall College, graduating in 1984 with honors while playing both varsity lacrosse and hockey. In 1987, he graduated from Brooklyn Law School. In 2019, he was awarded The Alumni Citation from Franklin & Marshall College. given to an alumnus or alumna who is distinguished in a particular profession, has provided leadership and service to the community, and has established an exemplary record of accomplishments in a specific field of endeavor.

== Career ==
Schaffer started his career in 1987 and has represented athletes in most of the major professional sports, including the NFL, NHL, PLL, and PGA Tour., including Joe Mixon.

In 2011, Schaffer started his own agency called Authentic Athletix, LLC, a sports and entertainment agency.

Schaffer has represented over 250 athletes such as Pro Football Hall of Famers, Barry Sanders (Lions – Pro Football HOF -2005, College Football HOF 2003, 1988 Heisman Trophy Winner, NFL All Time team), Jerome Bettis (Steelers – Pro Football HOF 2015), Willie Roaf (Chiefs and Saints, Pro Football HOF 2012 and College Football HOF 2014, NFL All Time team), Steve Atwater (Denver Broncos – Pro Football HOF 2020), Joe Thomas (Est Pro Football HOF 2022, College Football HOF 2019, NFL All Time team, 2006 Outland Trophy Award Winner), as well as NFL stars like Eddie George (Titans and 1995 Heisman Trophy, Maxwell Award, Doak Walker Award Winner), Antonio Bryant (Cowboys and Biletnikoff Award winner 2000), Joe Mixon (Bengals), Lael Collins (Bengals), Allen Lazard (Jets), Randy Gregory (Cowboys), Samari Rolle (Titans and Ravens), Derrick Mason (Titans and Ravens), Phil Taylor (Browns), Lito Sheppard (Eagles), Trevor Pryce (Broncos), Joshua Cribbs (Browns), C. J. Anderson, (Broncos), Mario Edwards, Jr. (Saints), Vontaze Burfict (Raiders), Tra Thomas (Eagles), Adam “Pacman” Jones (Bengals), Alfred Williams (Broncos, College Football Hall of Fame 2015), Larry Johnson (Chiefs, Doak Walker and Maxwell Award winner 2002), Rudi Johnson (Bengals), Mike Anderson (Broncos, 2000 NFL Rookie of the year), Mike Adams (Colts), Al Wilson (Broncos), Lorenzo Alexander (Bills), Kris Wilson (Chiefs and from Lancaster, Pa.), and Hakeem Nicks (Giants). Also represent PGA golfers including two-time PGA tour winner Jonathan Kaye (2004 FBR Phoenix Open and 2003 Buick Westchester Open) and Shane Bertsch. In addition, represents the top players in professional lacrosse including Trevor Baptiste, Pat and Chris Kavanaugh, Asher Nolting, Jared Barnhard, Jack Hannah, Michael Sowers, and Connor Shellenberger. Negotiated over One Billion dollars in contracts including making Sanders, Thomas, Brown, George, Roaf, Cribbs, and Mason the top paid players at their position in the NFL. Authentic Athletix and Peter Schaffer represents a large number of coaches both in the NFL and in College Football.

=== Media appearances ===
Schaffer appears on ABC Nightly News, Fox Sports, The Dan Patrick Show, HBO Real Sports and 60 Minutes.

On August 11, 2015, the Esquire Network premiered the critically acclaimed show The Agent, a documentary which documented Schaffer and three other NFL agents as they court potential clients in the months leading up to the NFL draft. In the documentary, Schaffer's clients included Mario Edwards Jr., Connor Halliday—who had a broken leg at the time—Gerod Holliman and Adam Jones.
