= Siege of Syracuse (1086) =

1086 siege

- Part of the Norman conquest of southern Italy
Date	May–October 1086
Location	Syracuse
Result	Norman victory

Belligerents
County of Sicily	Emirate of Syracuse

Commanders and leaders
Roger I of Sicily	Benavert †

Strength
Unknown	Unknown

In 1086, following a naval battle, the Islamo-Sicilian city of Syracuse was blockaded by sea and besieged by land from May to October by the forces of the Norman county of Sicily. Following the death and flight of its leaders, the city surrendered.

The main source for the siege, the Norman historian Geoffrey Malaterra, dates it to 1085, but modern historians believes this to be a mistake for 1086. (Note: Loud and Paul Brown say explicitly that Malaterra is mistaken. Eads follows Malaterra. While Eads, Houben and Gordon Brown place Benavert's raid on Calabria in 1084, Paul Brown places it after Guiscard's death. Loud gives the length of the siege as four months, Paul Brown as five.)

The campaign had a religious character, being conceived in response to outrages perpetrated against churches and nuns and pitting Christians against Muslims.

== Background ==
In 1081, Benavert, the emir of Syracuse, acquired control of the city of Catania, displacing its emir. The city was soon conquered, however, by Jordan, the son of Count Roger I of Sicily. In the summer of 1084, Benavert launched a raid on Calabria. At Nicotera, his soldiers took the inhabitants into slavery; at Reggio, they razed two churches; and at a place called Rocca d'Asino, they raped some nuns and took them into captivity. In response, Roger planned an attack on Syracuse. He was delayed by the death of his brother, Robert Guiscard, in July 1085 and the succession dispute between Robert's sons, Roger Borsa and Bohemond. In October 1085, he ordered the construction of a fleet at Messina.

== Battle ==
On 20 May 1086, the Norman fleet set out from Messina. It made three stops en route, during one of which Roger went ashore (Note: Malaterra calls the place Rasesalix, which according to Wolf lay on the coast south of Taormina and north of Syracuse. Paul Brown, on the other hand, identifies the place as Rosolini, some 41 miles (66 km) southwest Syracuse.) and met with his son, who was commanding the ground forces, composed mostly of cavalry. By 22 May, the fleet had anchored 15 miles (24 km) north of Syracuse. A group of native Sicilians, fluent in Greek and Arabic and disguised as fishermen or merchants, was sent by boat to under the command of a certain Philip reconnoiter the Syracusan fleet and harbour. It returned on 24 May. Prior to battle, the men took communion. The Normans attack at dawn on 25 May.

According to Malaterra, the Norman crossbows had the advantage at a distance, so the Syracusans decided to close in and attempt to board the Norman ships. Benavert personally led the attack on Roger's flagship. He was wounded by a javelin thrown by a Lombard named Lupino, although later legend transferred the blow to Count Roger. The Normans then successfully boarded his ship. Attempting to jump to another ship, he fell into the sea and was drowned. Those Syracusan ships which had not been captured then retreated to the harbour. Malaterra provides no information about the numbers of ships involved in the battle on either side.

== Siege ==
Following his victory at sea, Roger blockaded the city by sea and besieged it by land. Jordan led the land forces. Roger refused to allow his son to launch a direct attack. At this point in his narrative, Malaterra offers rare criticism of his patron, Roger, claiming that "if Jordan had attack the city at this time, it would have been forced to surrender with little effort on his part" before noting that "his father impurdently forbid him from doing this". The land siege probably focussed on Ortygia. Meanwhile, the fleet launched raids on the enemy coast.

During the summer, the Christian prisoners were released, probably in order to reduce the demands on the defenders' food stores, although Malaterra believed it was a gesture meant to assuage the attackers in the hopes they would retreat. In October, Benavert's widow and his son, with some leading citizens, successfully rowed past the blockade. Abandoned by their leaders, the citizens of Syracuse surrendered unconditionally. The siege had lasted a little over four months.
