= List of mayors of Syracuse, Sicily =

Mayor of Syracuse
- Sindaco di Siracusa

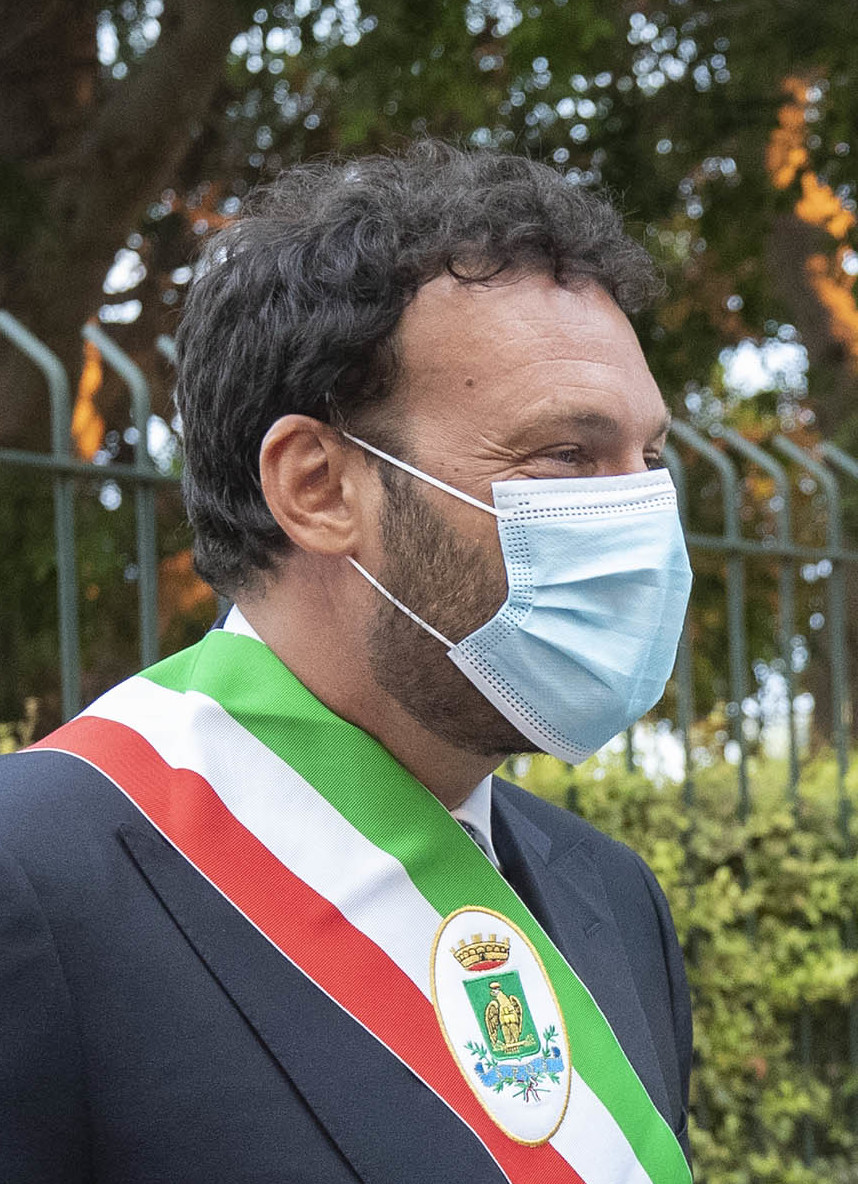
- Incumbent; Francesco Italia since 27 June 2018
- Member of: City Council
- Appointer: City Council election (1946–1994); Direct election (since 1994)
- Term length: 5 years, renewable once
- Formation: 1860
- Website: Official website

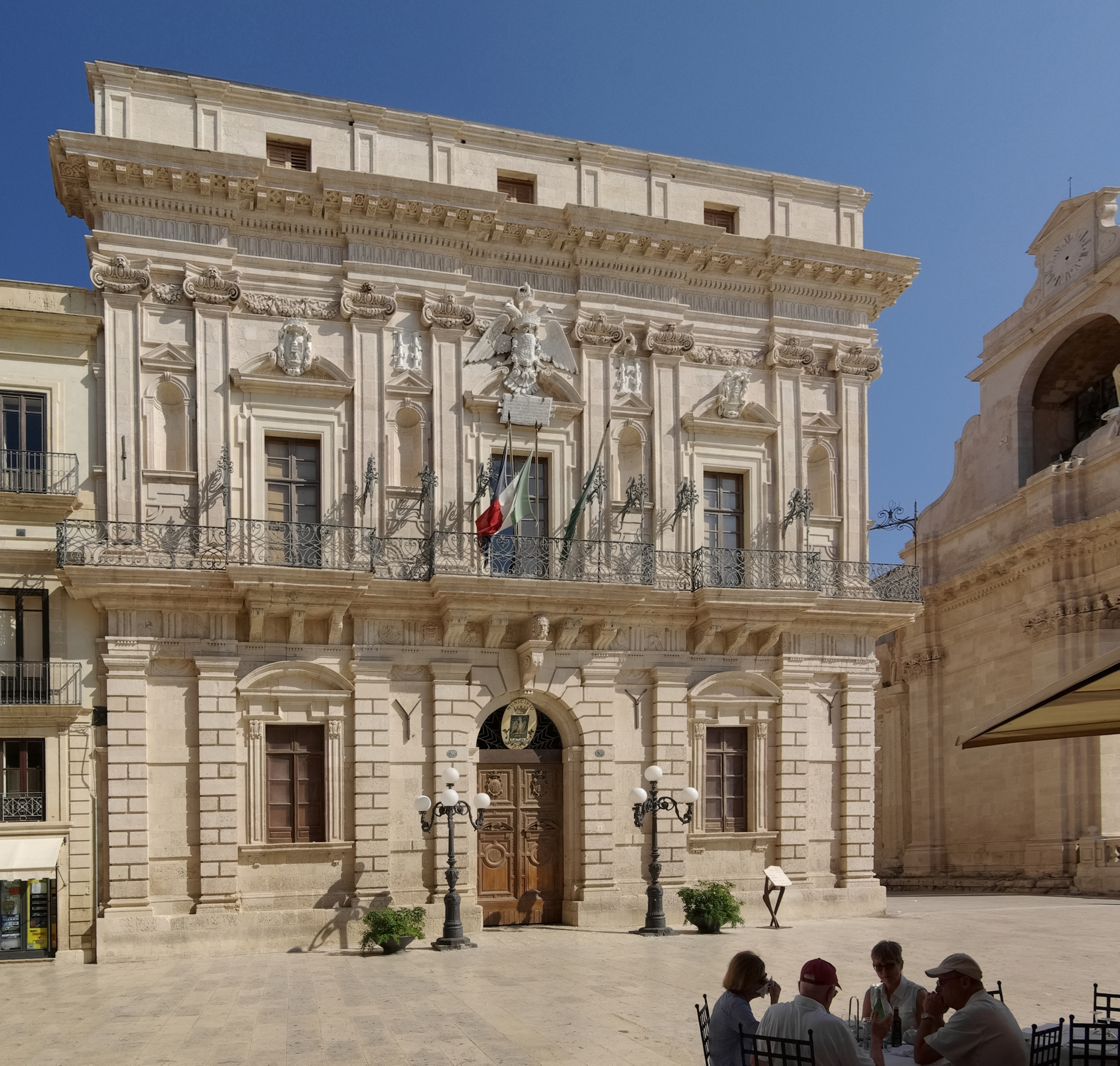
Palazzo del Vermexio is Syracuse's City Hall

The mayor of Syracuse is an elected politician who, along with the Syracuse's city council, is accountable for the strategic government of Syracuse in Sicily, Italy.

The current mayor is Francesco Italia who took office on 27 June 2018 and was re-elected on 12 June 2023.

== Overview ==
According to the Italian Constitution, the mayor of Syracuse is member of the city council.

The mayor is elected by the population of Syracuse, who also elects the members of the city council, controlling the mayor's policy guidelines and is able to enforce his resignation by a motion of no confidence. The mayor is entitled to appoint and release the members of his government.

Since 1994 the mayor is elected directly by Syracuse's electorate: in all mayoral elections in Italy in cities with a population higher than 15,000 the voters express a direct choice for the mayor or an indirect choice voting for the party of the candidate's coalition. If no candidate receives at least 50% of votes, the top two candidates go to a second round after two weeks. The election of the City Council is based on a direct choice for the candidate with a preference vote: the candidate with the majority of the preferences is elected. The number of the seats for each party is determined proportionally.

== Republic of Italy (since 1946) ==
=== City Council election (1946–1994) ===
From 1946 to 1994, the Mayor of Syracuse was elected by the City's Council.

	Mayor	Term start	Term end	Party
1	Mario Tommaso Gargallo	16 May 1946	24 June 1948	Ind
2	Salvatore Monteforte	24 June 1948	22 December 1948	PdA
3	Vincenzo Greco	22 December 1948	22 November 1950	Ind
4	Alessandro Spagna	22 November 1950	5 December 1952	Ind
5	Marcellino Alagona	5 December 1952	20 March 1957	Ind
6	Raffaello Caracciolo	20 March 1957	5 February 1965	DC
7	Antonio Giuliano	5 February 1965	9 May 1966	DC
8	Vincenzino Tedecshi	9 May 1966	31 January 1967	DC
9	Gaetano Costa	31 January 1967	5 April 1968	DC
(7)	Antonio Giuliano	5 April 1968	18 December 1971	DC
10	Marcello Sgarlata	18 December 1971	22 March 1972	DC
11	Luigi Foti	22 March 1972	27 February 1974	DC
12	Concetto Rizza	27 February 1974	9 August 1978	DC
13	Benedetto Brancati	9 August 1978	23 March 1981	DC
14	Gaetano Tirantello	23 March 1981	23 May 1983	DC
15	Aldo Salvo	23 May 1983	4 August 1984	DC
16	Fausto Spagna	4 August 1984	19 June 1986	DC
17	Concetto Lo Bello	19 June 1986	30 November 1986	DC
(16)	Fausto Spagna	30 November 1986	7 March 1989	DC
18	Salvatore Barberi	7 March 1989	4 July 1990	DC
19	Gaetano Bandiera	4 July 1990	23 November 1991	DC
20	Litterio Gilistro	23 November 1991	11 July 1992	DC
21	Francesco Cirillo	11 July 1992	13 March 1993	DC
22	Vincenzo Di Raimondo	13 March 1993	28 June 1994	DC

=== Direct election (since 1994) ===
Since 1994, under provisions of new local administration law, the Mayor of Syracuse is chosen by direct election, originally every four, then every five years.

	Mayor	Term start	Term end	Party	Coalition	Election
23	Marco Fatuzzo	28 June 1994	12 June 1998	Ind	PDS • PPI • LR • AD	1994
24	Vincenzo Dell'Arte	12 June 1998	9 August 1999 (Note: Resigned.)	PPI	DS • PPI • LR • AD	1998
Special Prefectural Commissioner tenure (9 August 1999 – 22 December 1999)
25	Giambattista Bufardeci	22 December 1999	12 June 2004	FI	House of Freedoms (FI-AN-CCD)	1999
25	Giambattista Bufardeci	12 June 2004	1 March 2008 (Note: Resigned.)	FI	House of Freedoms (FI-AN-UDC)	2004
Special Prefectural Commissioner tenure (1 March 2008 – 16 June 2008)
26	Roberto Visentin	16 June 2008	1 January 2013 (Note: Resigned.)	PdL	PdL • UDC • MpA	2008
Special Prefectural Commissioner tenure (1 January 2013 – 25 June 2013)
27	Giancarlo Garozzo	25 June 2013	27 June 2018	PD	PD • IM	2013
28	Francesco Italia	27 June 2018	13 June 2023	A	Centre-left independent lists	2018
28	Francesco Italia	13 June 2023	incumbent	A	Centrist independent lists	2023

== See also ==
- List of tyrants of Syracuse
- Count of Syracuse
