= Battle of Syracuse =

Battles of Syracuse may refer to:

- First and Second Battles of Syracuse in 415 and 414 BC, where Athens fought the Syracusans and Spartans
- Battle of Syracuse in 397 BC, during one of the Carthaginian campaigns in Sicily.
- Siege of Syracuse in 212 BC, between the city of Syracuse, and a Roman army under Marcellus sent to put down the city's uprising. The battle that Archimedes held off for two years and the battle that killed Archimedes
- Battle of Syracuse (1710), a naval battle in the War of the Spanish Succession between French and British fleets.

== See also ==
- Siege of Syracuse (disambiguation)
- Syracuse (disambiguation)
