= Jordan of Hauteville =

Jordan of Hauteville (c. 1060–1092) was the eldest son and bastard of Roger I of Sicily. A fighter, he took part, from an early age, in the conquests of his father in Sicily.

Jordan is named as son of Count Roger's first marriage in Europäische Stammtafeln but, according to Geoffrey Malaterra, his mother was a concubine of Roger I. Her origin is unknown.

In 1077, at the siege of Trapani, one of two Saracen strongholds remaining in the west of the island, Jordan led a sortie which successfully surprised the guards of the garrison's grazing animals. Its food supply now cut off, the city soon surrendered. He was present at the siege of Taormina in 1079 and, in 1081, with Robert of Sourdeval (or Sourval) and Elias Cartomensis (a Saracen turncoat), he retook the city of Catania from the last emir of Syracuse, Ibn Abbad, in another surprise attack. The next year, while his father was away helping Robert Guiscard, his brother the Duke of Apulia, Jordan was left in charge. But in the summer of 1083, Jordan led a few disaffected nobles in rebellion. His father returned and immediately blinded the leaders of the revolt, only pardoning his son at the last moment, to instill in him a healthy respect for authority. He was loyal ever thereafter.

On 22 May 1085, the fleet of his father anchored offshore of Jordan's own cavalry forces fifteen mile north of Syracuse. On May 25, the navies of the count and the emir engaged in the harbour and, the emir himself dying in battle, the forces of Roger landed ashore to find Jordan already besieging the city. The siege lasted throughout the summer, but the city eventually capitulated, leaving only Noto still under Saracen dominion. In February 1091, Jordan was present at the siege of that city as well. Jordan was made lord of Noto and count of Syracuse and there he died, of fever, probably in 1092 : according to Malaterra, "the whole city was wracked with so great a tearful wailing that it brought even the Saracens, enemies to our race, to tears...".

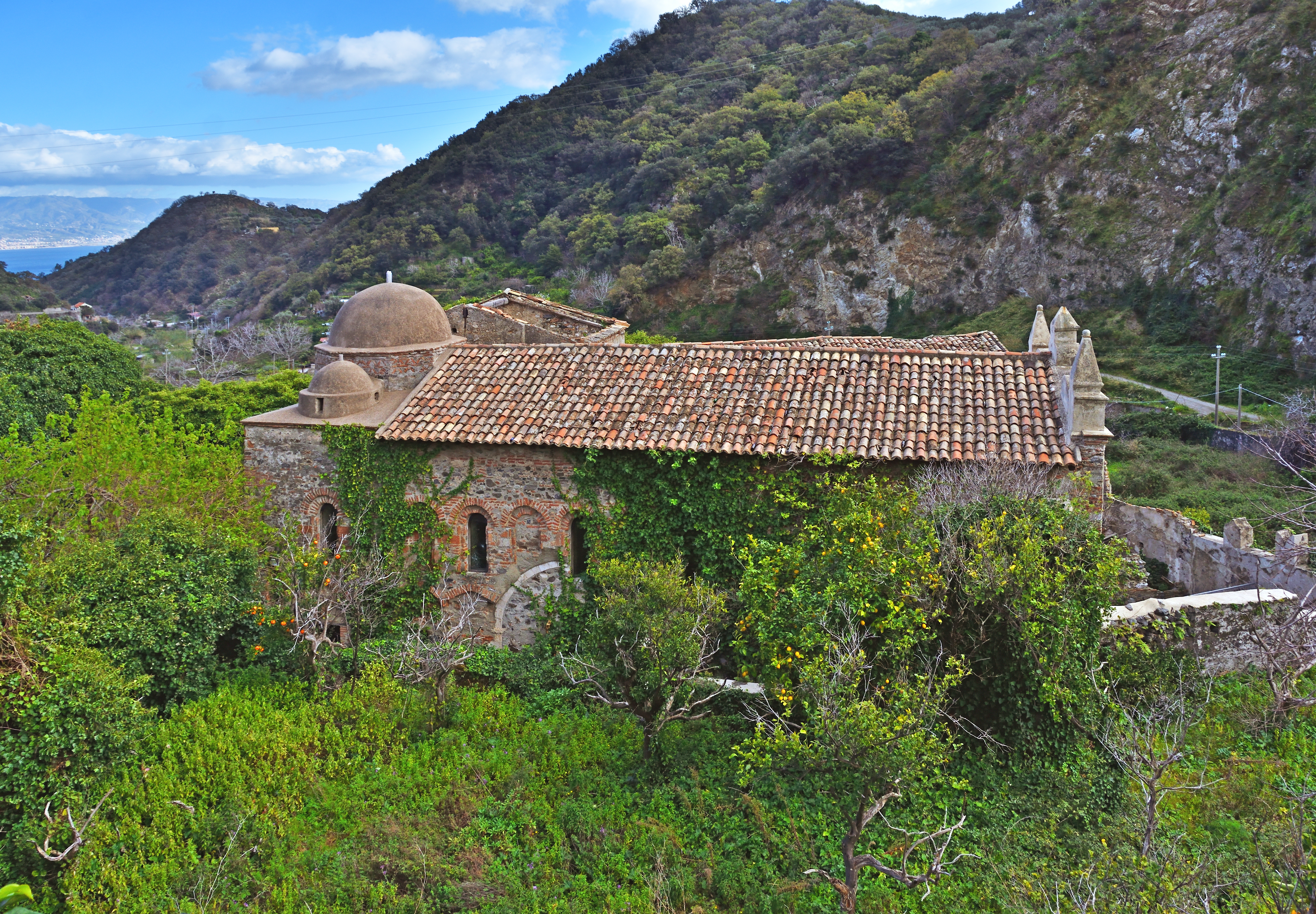
The church of Santa Maria in Mili San Pietro where Jordan was buried.

Despite having inherited all the Hauteville attributes which had made their rule in the Mezzogiorno all but inevitable, he had not been in line for the succession on account of his illegitimacy until his brother Geoffrey became a leper, then he had been designated heir apparent. A stone recording his death can still be seen in the church of Santa Maria in Mili San Pietro, near Messina. According to the baron de Bazancourt, his epitaph in Latin was:

Ad templum Sanctæ Mariæ de Mili Jordanus, Rogerii comitis filius, qui, quantus fuit, invictus consilio auctorque domesticæ libertatis, ipsa devicta a Barbaris Sicilia demonstrat, occidit Syracusis, tandem hic tumulatus jacet. Anno D. MXCII.

In 1089, his father arranged his marriage to a daughter of Manfred, brother of Boniface del Vasto. Roger married, at the same time, Adelaide del Vasto, another daughter of Manfred's.

Jordan died without posterity.

== See also ==
- Norman conquest of Sicily
