= Bocoum =

Bocoum is a surname. Notable people with the surname include:

- Afel Bocoum (born 1955), Malian musician
- Baréma Bocoum (1914–1973), Malian politician and diplomat
- Jacqueline Fatima Bocoum, Senegalese journalist and author
- Marie-Thérèse Bocoum, Central African historian and diplomat
