= Tijani (disambiguation) =

The Tijani is a Sufi order.

Tijani may also refer to:

- Ahmed Tijani, multiple people
- Tijani (given name), a masculine given name

== See also ==
- Al-Tijani (disambiguation)
- Tidjani
- Tijjani
