= Tidjani Serpos =

Tidjani Serpos is a compound surname. Notable people with the surname include:

- Ismaël Tidjani Serpos (born 1948), Beninese politician
- Nouréini Tidjani-Serpos (born 1946), Beninese professor of African literature
