= Tia Philomène Glao =

Ivorian businesswoman (born 1960)

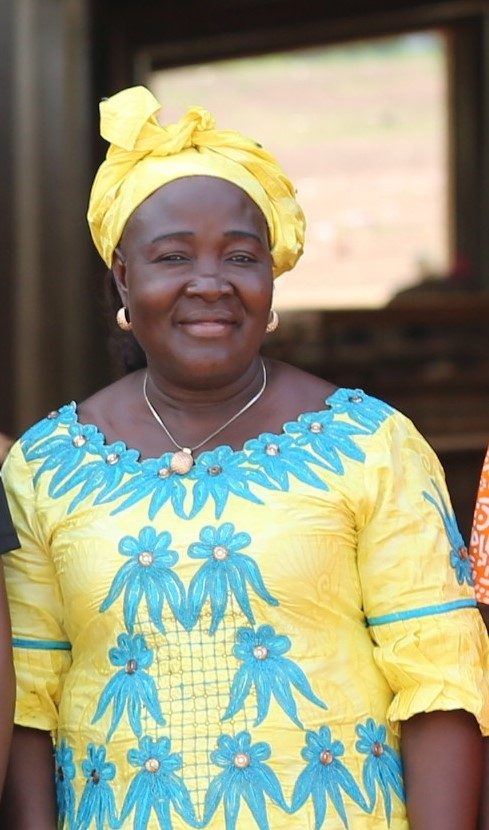

Tia Philomène Glao (born January 1, 1960), is an Ivorian businesswoman from western Côte d'Ivoire. She is the founding president of Maindeba Group, which operates in seven sectors in Côte d'Ivoire, including transportation, hospitality, retail, agriculture, and livestock farming.

== Biography ==
Tia Philomène Glao was born in the Tonkpi region, in western Côte d'Ivoire. She comes from a large family of 42 children, including 7 boys. Her father is a polygamist, and her family is poor. Neither she nor her sisters attended school.

== Entrepreneurial journey ==
In 2007, she invested in the hotel industry in Man city. She then founded a transportation company, which she named Maindeba Transport (MT). The name "Maindeba" means "it's mine" in Yacouba language, the main language of the Tonpki region. By 2016, MT owned 70 buses. In 2017, her company received 10 new buses.

=== Cooperative ===
Tia Philomène Glao also founded the Simplified Cooperative Society of Women Agricultural and Food Producers of Tonkpi (SCOOPS-PAVIT). The notice of the cooperative's incorporation was published in August 2014. With a capital of 1.35 billion CFA francs in 2014, she served as chair of the management committee at the time of its founding. The cooperative employs more than 600 women in the region.

== Recognition and honors ==
- 2016: National Award for Excellence in Promoting Women's Skills (Prix national d'excellence pour la valorisation des compétences féminines)
- 2018: Order of Ivory Merit
- 2019: Ivory Coast's Top Businesswoman (Meilleure femme d'affaires de Côte d'Ivoire)
