= Banu Jami' =

Banu Jami بنو جامع (Arabic)
- 1096–1159
- The lands ruled by the Banu Jami'
- Status: Sovereign taifa emirate (1096-?); Nominal vassal of the Abbasid Caliphate (?-1147); Vassal of the Kingdom of Sicily (1148-1158)
- Capital: Gabes
- Other languages: Arabic
- Ethnic groups: Arabs; Berbers
- Religion: Islam (official): Sunni Islam (1147-1159)
- Government: Monarchy
- Emir
  - 1096-1106: Makki ibn Kamil
  - 1147-1159: Mudafi' ibn Rushaid
- History
  - Dahmanid capture of Gabes: 1096
  - Zirid-Gabes war: 1118
  - Yusuf's war: 1147
  - Almohad invasion of Gabes: 1159
- Currency: Dinar al-Rushaydiya
Preceded by	Succeeded by
Banu Zughba	Almohad Caliphate
- Today part of: Tunisia

Banu Jami', was an Arab dynasty that ruled Gabes. Its emirate was established by Makki ibn Kamil al-Dahmani of the Banu Hilal. It fell at the hands of the Almohads in 1159.

== Origin ==
Kamil ibn Jami', father of the dynasty, was a member in al-Manaqisha clan, which he ruled as well, he was the son of Jami' ibn Dahman ibn Ali. The Dahmanids are a branch of Banu Yazid, from Banu Mirdas, from Banu Riyah, from Banu Hilal, who migrated to Ifriqiya in the 11th century.

== History ==
=== Background ===
Gabes had been ruled by the Sanhaji Banu Walmuyah dynasty since the Hilalian invasion. In 1095, the dynasty was overthrown by the local population, who then appointed Umar ibn al-Mu'izz ibn Badis as their emir. However, this displeased his brother Tamim, Emir of Mehdia, who viewed Umar's appointment as a challenge to his authority. Tamim therefore invaded the city and deposed his brother. This, in turn, triggered another revolt, forcing Tamim to hand the city over to the Hilalian Banu Zaghba tribe, which had been expelled to southern Ifriqiya by the Banu Riyah in 1075. Subsequently, the Banu Riyah, led by Makki ibn Kamil, Emir of al-Manaqisha, descended upon Gabes and expelled the Banu Zaghba. Makki then established himself as Emir of Gabes, marking the establishment of the Banu Jami' dynasty.

The medieval historians did not specify the year in which Makki came to power. Afifi Mahmoud and Najwan Abu Bakr date his rise to power to sometime between 1095 and 1097, while Muhammed al-Marzouki, Hadi Roger Idris, and Khalid Abd al-Badi' place the event in 1096. Their dating is based on the assumption that the revolt against the Zirids and the Banu Zaghba's brief rule occurred in late 1095 or early 1096, followed by Makki ibn Kamil's arrival and capture of the city in mid-to-late 1096. Belguasem Jarad, meanwhile, dates the event to 1097.

=== Makki ibn Kamil (1096-1106) ===
During Makki's reign, Gabes became a refuge for opponents and enemies of the Badisid dynasty. After al-Muthanna ibn Tamim was removed from his position as crown prince in favor of his brother Yahya, he was also expelled from Mehdia for displaying signs of jealousy and envy toward his brother. Al-Muthanna subsequently went to Gabes to seek the support of the Banu Jami'.

Makki welcomed al-Muthanna and treated him hospitably. Al-Muthanna managed to persuade Makki to support a campaign against Sfax and Mehdia, agreeing to finance the expedition with his own money. Makki gathered an army and was joined by an Oghuz warlord known as Shah Malek. Together with al-Muthanna, they marched on Sfax and attacked the city. When Tamim learned of the rebellion, he dispatched an army to confront the attackers. Upon hearing this, al-Muthanna changed his plans and instead attacked Mehdia, which was lightly defended. However, Yahya ibn Tamim repelled the assault, forcing the rebels to retreat in defeat. Al-Muthanna subsequently lost his funds and assets and was unable to finance another campaign. His rebellion therefore came to an end, and Makki returned to Gabes without making any further attempts to fight the Zirids. In 1099, Sfax fell to the Zirids, and Tamim succeeded in overthrowing Hammou ibn Malil after forty years of rivalry. Hammou sought refuge in Gabes, where he was welcomed and treated kindly. He settled in the city and eventually died there.

As with the year of his accession, the date of Makki's death is disputed. While Afifi and Marzouki place his death between 1101 and 1104, he probably died in 1106. This dating is supported by al-Tijani, who confirmed that Tamim ibn al-Mu'izz was still alive when Makki died, as well as by inscriptions indicating that Makki's successor was already ruling in 1106.

=== Rafi‘ ibn Makki (1106-?) ===
After Makki's death, his son Rafi‘ succeeded him. Gabes flourished during Rafi‘'s reign. Rafi‘ continued the construction of Qasr al-Arusayn and laid the foundations for the Gabes fleet by beginning the construction of a large ship. His reign was also marked by friendly relations with Yahya ibn Tamim, the new Emir of Mehdia, who supported Rafi‘ and assisted him in building the vessel. However, after Ali ibn Yahya succeeded his father Yahya, the vessel became a symbol of hostility rather than peace. Ali opposed maritime competition and sought to maintain the Zirid monopoly over maritime trade in Ifriqiya.

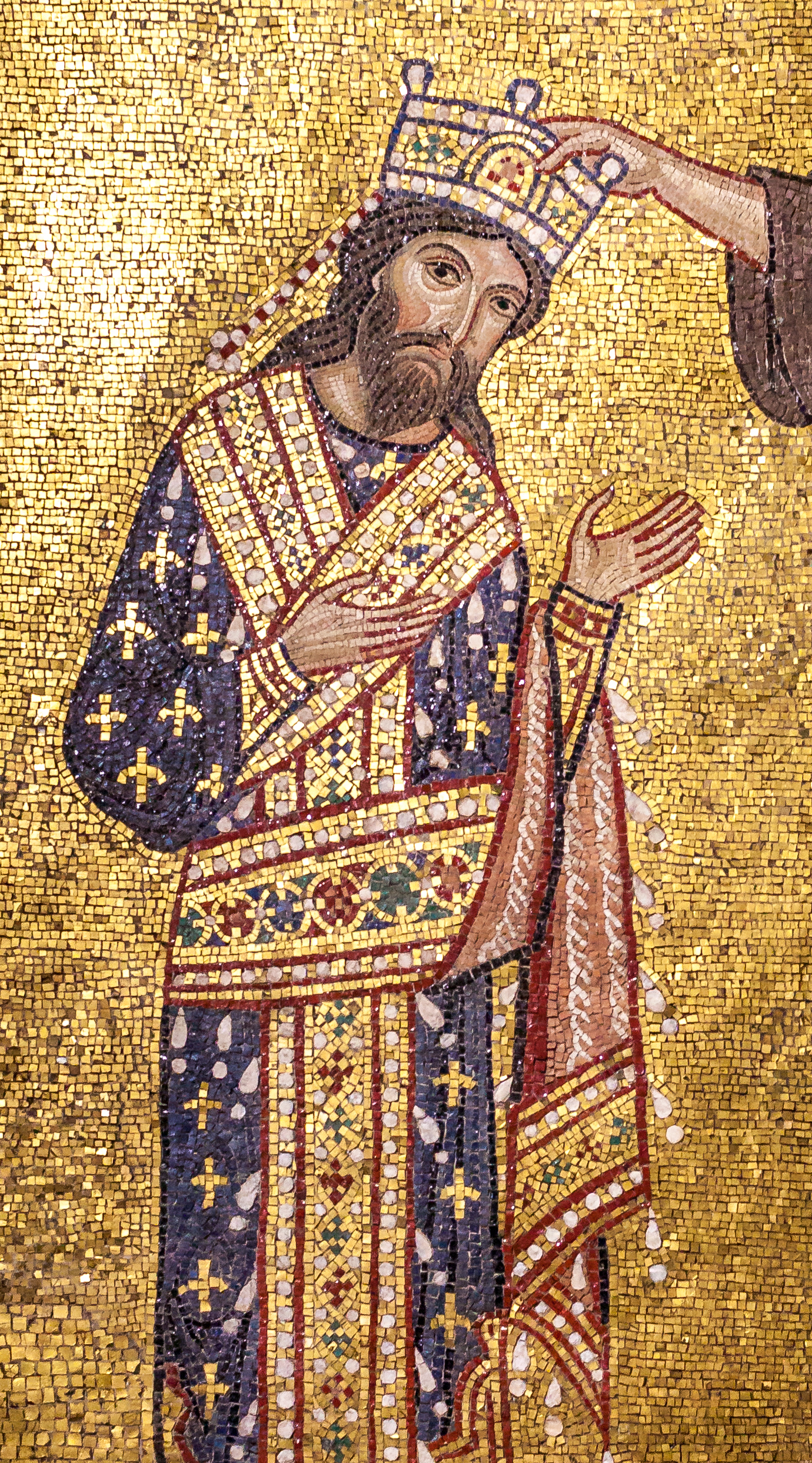
Roger II, Count of Sicily, always showed support to Gabes against the Zirids.

In 1117, Ali dispatched a fleet consisting of six warships and four dromons to Gabes to prevent Rafi‘'s ship from leaving the port and seize it if it attempted to do so. Fearing the Zirid fleet, Rafi‘ sent a message to Roger II, Count of Sicily, explaining that he had built the ship intending to use it to deliver a gift to Roger and requesting his protection. Roger accepted and dispatched a Norman fleet of twenty-four ships to defend Gabes. The accounts differ regarding what happened next. According to Ibn al-Athir, the Zirid and Norman fleets arrived at Gabes simultaneously. However, Rafi‘ did not join his allies, and when the Normans received no assistance from him, they departed. The city was left under a Zirid siege, which did not last long before being lifted, after which the Badisid fleet withdrew. According to al-Tijani, however, the Normans arrived first and were feasting in Gabes when the Zirid fleet appeared. As the Normans attempted to board their ships, the Zirid fleet attacked them, killing many and capturing a large number of their vessels. The Zirids subsequently laid siege to Gabes and sabotaged its water reservoir. However, because the siege was conducted by sea without a corresponding land blockade, they failed to capture the city and were forced to withdraw before the onset of winter. Ibn Khaldun supports this account.

The accounts also differ regarding the next phase of the war. According to al-Tijani and Ibn Idhari, Ali intended to continue the war and began recruiting Arab tribes and preparing his fleet. When Rafi‘ learned of these preparations, he sent ambassadors to seek peace, but Ali refused to negotiate. Rafi‘ therefore gathered an army and marched on Mahdia. By contrast, according to Ibn al-Athir and al-Nuwayri, Rafi‘ was the one who mobilized the Arab tribes and marched on Mahdia with a large Bedouin contingent. He claimed that he had come to declare his submission and make peace, but, as the account states, “His actions contradict his words,” and Ali refused to believe him. It remains uncertain whether Rafi‘ or Ali was responsible for the resumption of hostilities. Nevertheless, the accounts generally agree on the subsequent outcome, although they differ in their descriptions of the events. Al-Tijani merely states that Rafi‘ was defeated in an attack by Ali ibn Yahya, whereas the other historians provide a more detailed account. According to these accounts, two battles followed. In the first, the Zirid army attacked in the afternoon and pushed back the Bedouin forces. The Zirids then attacked the Arab encampments, causing the women there to scream in fear. Their cries inflamed the Bedouins' sense of honor and provoked them into attacking the Zirid forces. A battle ensued and continued until sunset, ultimately ending in the defeat of Rafi‘ and his allies. Rafi‘ subsequently faced an even greater crisis when three-fifths of the Arab troops in his army defected to the Zirids, leaving the Banu Dahman as his only genuinely loyal tribal allies. In the second battle, the Zirid army attacked again and inflicted a crushing defeat on Rafi‘.

Unable to capture Mehdia, Rafi‘ retreated under cover of darkness toward Kairouan. However, the city's inhabitants closed its gates against him. After several days of fighting, Rafi‘ managed to capture the city. Before these events, the sheikhs of Dahman had granted him Kairouan as a feudality. Ali dispatched an army to Kairouan, supported by Arab tribes whom he had paid to join his campaign. Following a battle or siege, Rafi‘ was defeated and forced to retreat toward Gabes. Through the mediation of Maymun ibn Ziyad al-Sakhri, a peace treaty was subsequently concluded between Banu Jami‘ and Banu Ziri, bringing the war to an end.

The circumstances of Rafi‘'s death, the end of his reign, and the date of his death remain unknown.

=== Rushaid ibn Kamil (?-1147) ===
A gold dinar from the 10th–12th centuries associated with a Hilalian dynasty in North Africa. It may have belonged to Rushaid ibn Kamil.

Rushaid ibn Kamil, who ruled Gabes during the war, succeeded Rafi‘ after his death. According to some accounts, Rushaid was Rafi‘'s nephew, while others identify him as his cousin or son. During Rushaid's reign, Gabes enjoyed peace and prosperity, as he focused on administering the emirate and overseeing construction and development. He completed the construction of Qasr al-Arusayn, (Note: Al-Tijani concluded from his researched that the construction of Qasr al-Arusayn was begun by the Zirids, continued by Rafi‘ ibn Makki, and finally completed by Rushaid. Many modern scholars support this theory.) and minted a currency for Gabes known as the al-Rashidiya. Poets and writers came to his court, including Ibn Hamdis, who praised him. Rushaid pledged allegiance to the Abbasid Caliphate and had the name of al-Muqtafi inscribed on his coins. He also minted coins in the style of the Sunni Almoravid dynasty. It is possible that Maliki scholars, such as Abu al-Qasim Muhammad ibn Khalaf Allah, known as Ibn Mishkan, influenced Rushaid's decision to recognize the Abbasid caliphate rather than the Fatimid Caliphate. Ibn Mishkan was a student of al-Mazari and served as the qadi of Gabes. Rushaid himself played a role in restoring Maliki Sunni Islam in Gabes and abolishing Shi'ism. He died in 1147.

=== Muhammad ibn Rushaid (1147) ===
After Rushaid's death, his son Muhammad succeeded him. The accounts of Muhammad's reign differ considerably. According to Ibn Khaldun and al-Tijani, Muhammad left the city on a military campaign, appointing one of his sons to govern Gabes in his absence and placing him under the supervision of a man named Yusuf. However, Yusuf staged a coup, expelled Muhammad's son, and seized control of Gabes. He then pledged allegiance to Roger II, who had become King of Sicily earlier that decade, having previously held the title of count. Nothing further is recorded about Muhammad ibn Rushaid in these accounts.

Ibn al-Athir provides a different account. According to him, Rushaid's eldest son and designated heir was named Muammar. Following Rushaid's death, however, a freed slave (mawla) named Yusuf expelled Muammar from the city and installed his younger brother, Muhammad, as ruler, appointing himself as the latter's regent. During his regency, Yusuf assaulted several women belonging to Muhammad's harem. One of these women belonged to the Banu Qurrah tribe and informed her brothers of the incident. When her brothers arrived to take her away, Yusuf refused to release her, arguing that she belonged to his master's harem. The Banu Qurrah and Muammar ibn Rushaid subsequently appealed to al-Hasan ibn Ali, Emir of Ifriqiya, and complained about Yusuf's conduct. When al-Hasan sent Yusuf a message conveying the complaints and demanding that he release the woman from the Banu Qurrah, Yusuf threatened to hand Gabes over to Roger II. Al-Hasan began assembling an army to deal with Yusuf, prompting the latter to send another message declaring his obedience and requesting appointment as governor of Gabes, similar to the appointment previously granted to Rafi‘ ibn Matrouh in Tripoli. Roger II responded favorably, sending Yusuf a letter of appointment and the official robes of office. Ibn Abi Dinar adds that Roger honored Yusuf through Christian ceremonies and collected the taxes of Gabes from him. Nothing further is recorded about Muhammad ibn Rushaid in this account.

==== Yusuf of Gabes (1147) ====
A chart showing the lineage of Banu Jami'

We now turn to the continuation of Ibn al-Athir's account. After Yusuf declared his allegiance to Roger II, al-Hasan began treating the situation more seriously. Yusuf's ambassador and al-Hasan's representative met at Roger II's court in Sicily, where they engaged in a debate. During the discussion, Yusuf's ambassador insulted al-Hasan. The Zirid ambassador conveyed the news to al-Hasan by means of a carrier pigeon, prompting the emir to dispatch a fleet that captured the Gabesian ambassador. When the ambassador was brought before him, al-Hasan declared that Yusuf had surrendered Muslim territory to the Franks and insulted him. He then ordered the ambassador to be paraded through the city on the back of a camel, with bells attached to his head. The people subsequently stoned the ambassador to death.

The Zirid army then arrived at Gabes and laid siege to the city. As Yusuf had become a vassal of a Christian ruler, the Muslim population of Gabes revolted against him and opened the gates to the Zirid army. Yusuf took refuge in the palace, which was probably Qasr al-Arusayn. However, the Zirids continued their assault until they breached the palace and captured him. Yusuf was subsequently handed over to Muammar ibn Rushaid and the Banu Qurrah brothers, who subjected him to brutal torture. As punishment for his assault on the woman from the Banu Qurrah, they castrated him and placed his severed genitals in his mouth. Thus, Yusuf's rule came to an end. Ibn Khaldun and al-Tijani summarize Yusuf's downfall in considerably fewer words, stating simply that the population of Gabes revolted against him.

The accounts agree that Isa, Yusuf's brother, fled to Sicily with Yusuf's son. There, they informed Roger II of the events in Gabes. Angered by the attack on one of his vassals, Roger dispatched a fleet to besiege the city. The siege lasted several days but failed to achieve its objective, and the Norman fleet eventually withdrew. Hadi Roger Idris offers an explanation for this failure, arguing that the Kingdom of Sicily was engaged in a war with the Byzantine Empire at the time, leaving most of its fleet occupied elsewhere.

As for Muhammad ibn Rushaid's fate, Marzouki suggests that he may have died during the war or been removed from power because of his young age and perceived weakness, allowing a more powerful member of his family to take his place, if Ibn al-Athir's account is followed.

==== Accuracy of the accounts ====
The question of which account is more accurate remains disputed, and modern historians have offered different interpretations. Najwan Abu Bakr considers the accounts of Ibn Khaldun and al-Tijani more reliable. He supports this interpretation by citing verses from Kharidat al-Qasr by Imad al-Isfahani, specifically a poem by Abu al-Fadl Abdullah ibn Nizar al-Hawari, known as Ibn al-Faqiya, which praises Muhammad ibn Rushaid. The poem describes Muhammad's betrayal by those close to him after his departure, while emphasizing his generosity, sound judgment, and skill with the sword. Abu Bakr argues that these qualities correspond to the events described in the accounts of Ibn Khaldun and al-Tijani. He further maintains that Muhammad could not have possessed such attributes if he had been a young child under a regency, as suggested by Ibn al-Athir's account. Abu Bakr also notes that when George of Antioch arrived to conquer Mahdia in 1148, he initially claimed to be seeking revenge on behalf of Muhammad ibn Rushaid. Al-Nuwayri likewise stated that Muhammad ibn Rushaid maintained good relations with Roger II. This suggests that Muhammad may have been a ruler of sufficient stature and independence to establish such relations with Sicily. However, al-Nuwayri's statement may have resulted from a misinterpretation of Ibn al-Athir's account. As Khaled Abd al-Wadoud points out, George may have been seeking revenge primarily for Yusuf rather than for Muhammad ibn Rushaid.

Conversely, Hadi Roger Idris fully endorses Ibn al-Athir's account and regards the versions provided by Ibn al-Athir and al-Tijani as distinct accounts that cannot both be correct. Idris argues that Ibn Khaldun's statement about Muhammad ibn Rushaid's departure from Gabes resulted from a misreporting of the episode in which Muammar was expelled. He also considers it implausible that Muhammad ibn Rushaid, if he were a young child ruling under a regent, could have led a military campaign and left his own son in charge of the city.

Marzouki attempts to reconcile the competing accounts by proposing that Rushaid may have passed over his eldest son in favor of his youngest when selecting his successor. According to this hypothesis, Muammar left Gabes after his father's death to seek support from Mahdia.

=== Mudafi' ibn Rushaid (1147-1159) ===
A map showing the lands of the Norman Kingdom of Africa. Gabes can easily be seen as part of this realm.

The sources differ regarding who succeeded Muhammad ibn Rushaid following the conflict involving Yusuf. Ibn Khaldun and al-Tijani state that Muhammad's brother Mudafi' succeeded him, whereas Ibn al-Athir claims that his brother Muammar became Emir of Gabes after winning the war. Most sources follow the first account, as Ibn al-Athir provides no further information about the Banu Jami' after this point. Consequently, Muammar ibn Rushaid disappears entirely from the historical record. Marzouki suggests several possible explanations: Muammar may have died during the war, abdicated in favor of his brother Mudafi', or been the same person as Mudafi', with the name "Muammar" resulting from a scribal error or corruption of "Mudafi'" due to the similarity between the two names. Ridwan, meanwhile, believes that Mudafi' was appointed by Roger II after the latter removed Muammar, whom the Sicilians regarded as a usurper. However, this hypothesis lacks supporting evidence.

Following Yusuf's defeat, Mudafi' ibn Rushaid rose to power as Emir of Gabes. During his reign, Gabes enjoyed security and stability, and poets and men of letters flocked to his court. Among them were Abu al-Fadl ibn Abdullah al-Hawwari, Yahya ibn al-Tifashi al-Gafsi, and al-Sakdali al-Gafsi. Another figure who arrived at the court was Sallam ibn Abu Bakr ibn Farhan al-Hilali al-Gabesi, who later became Mudafi's vizier. Mudafi' himself was a poet and a scholar of history and genealogy. In 1148, Mudafi' peacefully submitted to Roger II and acknowledged the authority of the Kingdom of Sicily. In 1158, like many other cities in Ifriqiya, Gabes rose in rebellion and declared its independence from Norman suzerainty.

In 1159, the Almohads arrived in Ifriqiya to conquer the region, expel the Normans, and bring an end to the taifa states. When Abd al-Mu'min first arrived, he sent Mudafi' messages in a friendly and conciliatory tone, inviting him to submit through a series of poems in which he addressed and reproached the emir. However, Mudafi' ignored the caliph's appeals. After laying siege to Mahdia, Abd al-Mu'min dispatched his son Abdullah to capture Gabes. Upon learning of the expedition and recognizing that he could not defend the city, Mudafi' gathered his family and clan and abandoned Gabes. However, he was intercepted by an Almohad force along the way. When a detachment of the force pursued him, he engaged it in battle. After several hours of fighting, he was defeated. Sallam ibn Farhan remained behind to cover Mudafi's retreat and was eventually killed in September 1159. His sacrifice enabled Mudafi' to escape successfully and take refuge in the territories of the Arab tribes around Tripoli. Gabes subsequently fell to the Almohads with little difficulty, bringing the Banu Jami' emirate to an end. Abd al-Mu'min's message to the people of Granada, dated 3 December 1159, mentions that Arabs who had fled Gabes arrived seeking pardon and security. This suggests that the Banu Jami' may have been abandoned by the tribes of Gabes during the Almohad conquest.

=== After the fall of Gabes ===
After spending two years in the Tripolitanian hinterland, Mudafi' consulted the elders of his clan about submitting to Abd al-Mu'min, and they supported his decision. Mudafi' travelled all the way to Fez, where he met Abd al-Mu'min. The caliph forgave him and allowed him to reside in Fez, where he died at the age of 90.

Banu Jami' بنو جامع
- Parent family: Al-Manaqisha of Banu Dahman
- Country: Emirate of Gabes (1096-1159)
- Founded: 11th century
- Founder: Kamil ibn Jami'
- Final ruler: Mudafi' ibn Rushaid
- Historic seat: Gabes
- Titles: Emir of al-Manaqisha; Emir of Gabes
- Dissolution: 1159

Not all members of the family followed him, however. Some of the Dahmanids fled east. One of them was Abu Sakin 'Amir ibn Muhammad ibn Makki, who took refuge in Damascus. Imad al-Isfahani described him as "a Bedouin and a secret prince". His son, Abu 'Amir Sakin ibn 'Amir, joined him in 1175. Abu Sakin died shortly afterward. Al-Isfahani records that Sakin was still in Damascus in 1195, but nothing is known about him thereafter. Both 'Amir and Sakin composed poems celebrating the glory of their family, which were preserved in Kharidat al-Qasr. Thus, the Banu Jami' gradually disappeared from the historical record, as no known source mentions them after this period.

== List of Emirs ==
- Makki ibn Kamil (1096-1106)
- Rafi' ibn Makki (1106-?)
- Rushaid ibn Kamil (?-1147)
- Muhammad ibn Rushaid (1147)
- Mudafi' ibn Rushaid (1147-1159)
