= Gabès =

City in Tunisia

Gabès قابس (Arabic) ڨابس (Tunisian Arabic)
- City
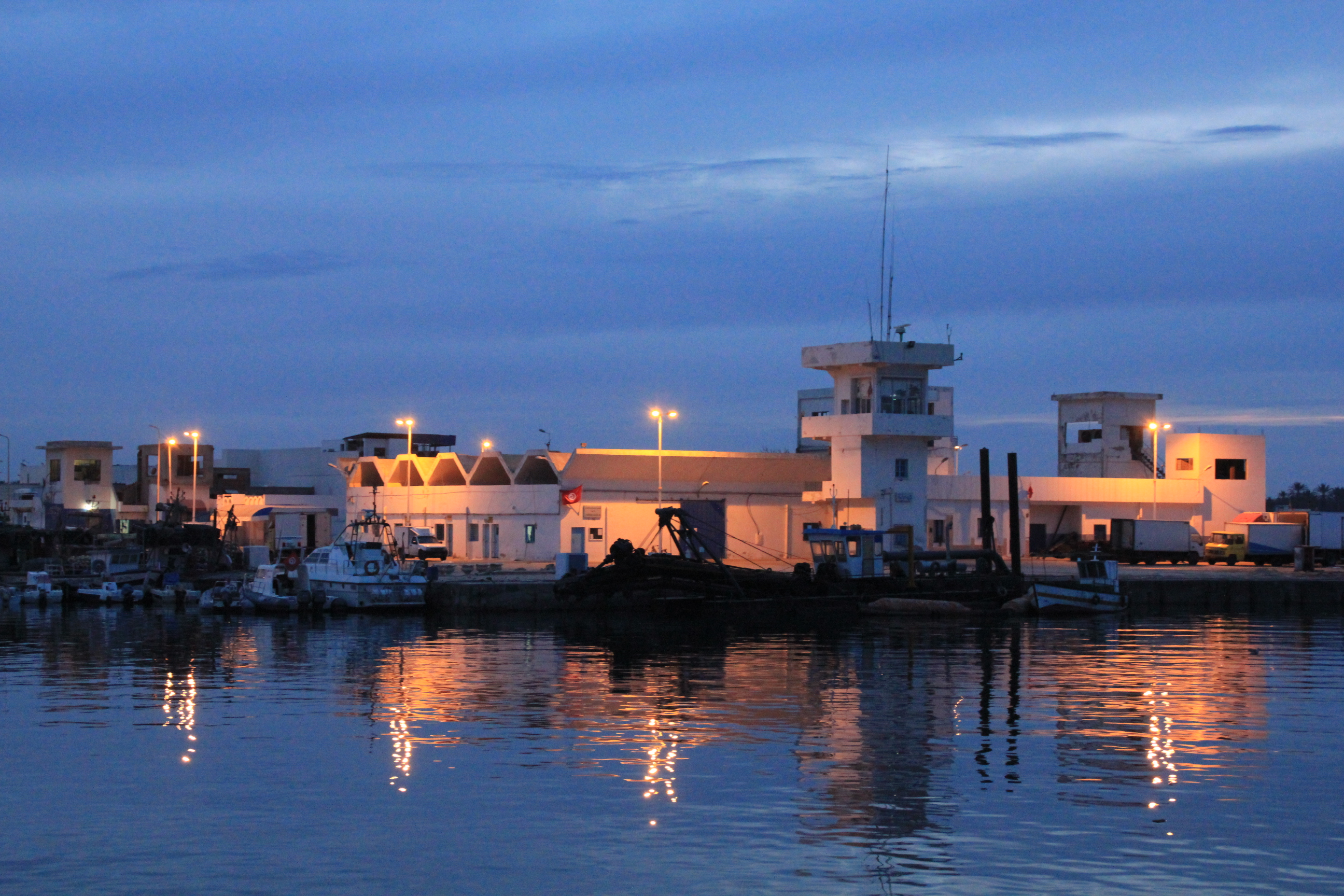
- View of Gabès bay

- Location within Tunisia
- Coordinates: 33°53′N 10°07′E
- Country: Tunisia
- Governorate: Gabès Governorate
- Delegation(s): Gabes Medina, Gabes West, Gabes South

Government
  - Mayor: Mohamed Aziz Ibrahim Jed (SFBT)

Population
  - Total: 167,863
- Time zone: UTC+1 (CET)
  - Summer (DST): UTC+2 (CEST)
- Website: Official website

Gabès (Note: Also spelled Cabès, Cabes, and Kabes.) (/ˈɡɑːbɛs/ GAH-bess, UK also /ˈɡɑːbɪs/ GAH-biss; Arabic: قابس, romanized: Qābis; Tunisian Arabic: ڨابس, romanized: Gābis, pronounced [ˈɡɛːbɪs]), is the capital of the Gabès Governorate in Tunisia. Situated on the coast of the Gulf of Gabès, the city has a population of 167,863, making it the 6th largest city in Tunisia. Located 327 km southeast of Tunis and 113 km from Sfax, Gabès lies at the delta of the Wadi Qabis, which originates 10 kilometers upstream at Ras al-Oued and serves as its primary water source.

Historically, the town was a Carthaginian settlement known as Tacapae before falling under Roman control. It was later ruined during the 7th-century Arab invasion but was recovered by Sidi Boulbaba, a revered companion of the Prophet Muhammad and a patron of the town. Although it experienced decline under the Ottomans, Gabès saw significant growth under French rule from 1881 to 1955, with the development of key infrastructure, including a railway, road network, and port. During World War II, the city served as the headquarters for Germany's Afrika Korps until British and French forces retook it in 1943.

Today, Gabès is a thriving commercial hub and oasis, with industries spanning fishing, agriculture, textiles, cement, brick manufacturing, and petrochemicals. Tourism also contributes to its economy, making it an important center in southern Tunisia.

== History ==
=== Etymology ===
Takapes, the ancient name of Gabès, is a Punic Numidian (Berber) toponym. Later, the prefix "Ta" (meaning "the" in Berber) was dropped, and the place became known as Kapes. As in Arabic the sound /p/ is unknown, Kapes became known as Kabes, and later known as Gabès.

=== Roman period ===
Gabès is the ancient Tacapae or Tacape (Τακάπη in Ancient greek) or Tacapes of the Roman province of Tripolitania.

Strabo refers to this city as an important entrepot of the Lesser Syrtis. Pliny (18.22) remarks that the waters of a copious fountain at Tacape were divided among the cultivators according to a system where each had the use of the water during a certain interval of time.

The Tabula Peutingeriana shows Tacape between Macomades and Sabratha.

=== Bishopric ===
Tacapae became a Christian bishopric that, no longer being a residential see, is included in the Catholic Church's list of titular sees.

Three of its bishops are known:

- Dulcitius, legate of the bishops of Tripolitana to the Council of Carthage (403) and present at the Conference of Carthage (411);
- Servilius, exiled by Huneric in 484;
- Caius or Gallus, legate of the bishops of his province to the Council of Carthage (525).

=== Islamic Caliphate and the Middle Ages ===
In the 7th century, the Umayyad Caliphate conquered the region, bringing Islam to Gabès. One of Prophet Muhammad's companions, Abu Lubaba Al'Ansari, settled in the city, contributing to its development as an Islamic center. The following centuries saw a succession of different rulers and dynasties. Among them was the Banu Jami' dynasty, in which Gabes saw much civilization and wars. During the Ottoman period, in 1574, Gabès became part of the Eyalet of Tunis, further cementing its role as a strategic trading hub in the Mediterranean region.

Gabès has been described by notable historians and travelers throughout history. In the 12th century, al-Idrisi praised its thriving economy, dense orchards, and bustling markets. He highlighted the city's production of dates, olives, and leather goods, as well as its strong fortifications. In the 14th century, al-Tijani depicted Gabès as a city of beauty and abundance, calling it the "paradise of the world" and "Little Damascus" due to its lush greenery and architectural charm. However, he also noted the city's health challenges, attributing frequent epidemics to the oleander trees that affected the water supply. In 1862, Victor Guérin described Gabès not as a singular city but as a collection of towns and villages forming a vast oasis, supported by the waters of the Wadi of Gabès.

=== French rule and the 20th century ===
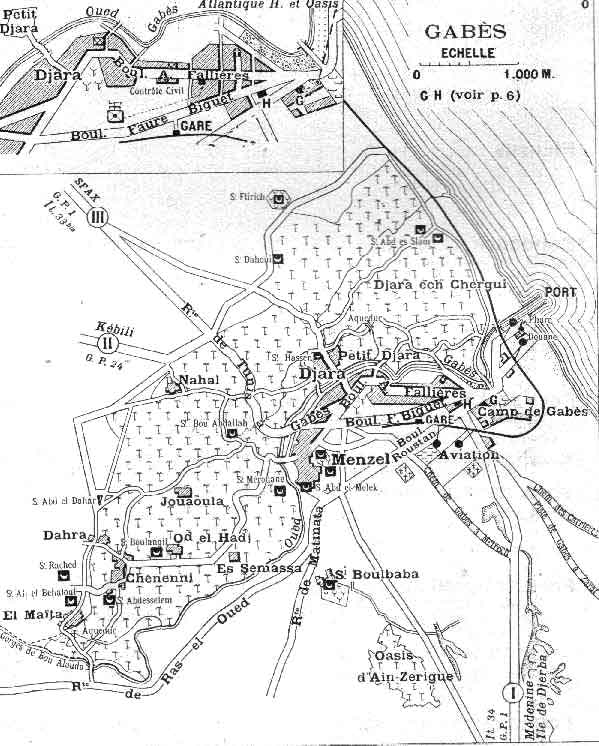
1928 map of Gabès under the French.

In the late 19th century, Tunisia came under French control, and in 1881, Gabès became part of the French protectorate. This period saw the introduction of modern infrastructure but also economic hardships for the local population. The 20th century brought further turmoil. After the fall of France in 1940, Gabès came under German control during World War II. Later years brought more instability. In 1941, Gabès was the scene of riots against Jewish communities.

In 1943, British forces assisted in retaking Gabès from German control as part of the Mareth Line operations, but this led to severe damage to the city's infrastructure. Reconstruction efforts began in 1945 to restore the city's economic and social life.

Gabès played a role in Tunisia's struggle for independence from France, and after gaining sovereignty in 1956, the city continued to develop while preserving its historical and cultural heritage. Today, Gabès is known for its blend of history, culture, and natural beauty, with its famous oasis being one of the last coastal oases in the world. Its historical significance remains evident in the archaeological remains and the continued traditions that link it to its rich past.

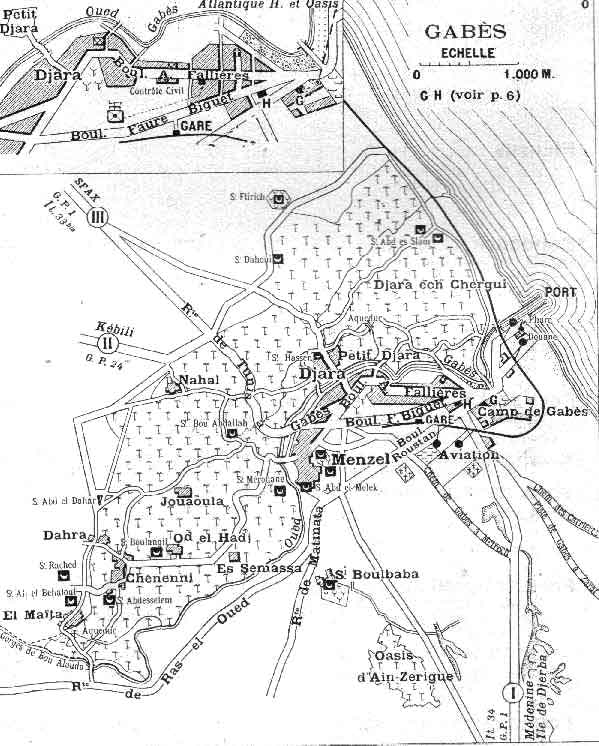
1928 map of Gabè

== Education ==
- University of Gabès

== Politics ==
In 2018, Nesrine Rajeh was appointed the mayor of the fourth district of Gabes, making her the first woman to hold the position.

== Economy ==
Gabès is one of the biggest industrial cities in Tunisia. Most industries are chemical oriented, this is why the city offers one of the best chemistry degrees in Africa from the University of Gabès. The main industries are:

- Cement
- Chemical products
- Brick Factories
- Oil refinery

The fast-growing numbers of factories has resulted in fairly serious pollution in the area and the Gulf of Gabès. In recent years the government has worked on new programs and laws to curb pollution.

== Environment ==
Due to the presence of many factories, the city has been suffering from air pollution for several years.

In October 2025, thousands of locals marched in the streets to protest the worsening air quality, particularly targeting a state-owned phosphate plant after a gas leak from the facility caused dozens of people to suffer from suffocation. Later, the number went up to over 120 people. In response, the president of Tunisia Kais Saied and top officials directed to begin looking for fast and comprehensive solutions for the environmental crises in the region.

== Transport ==
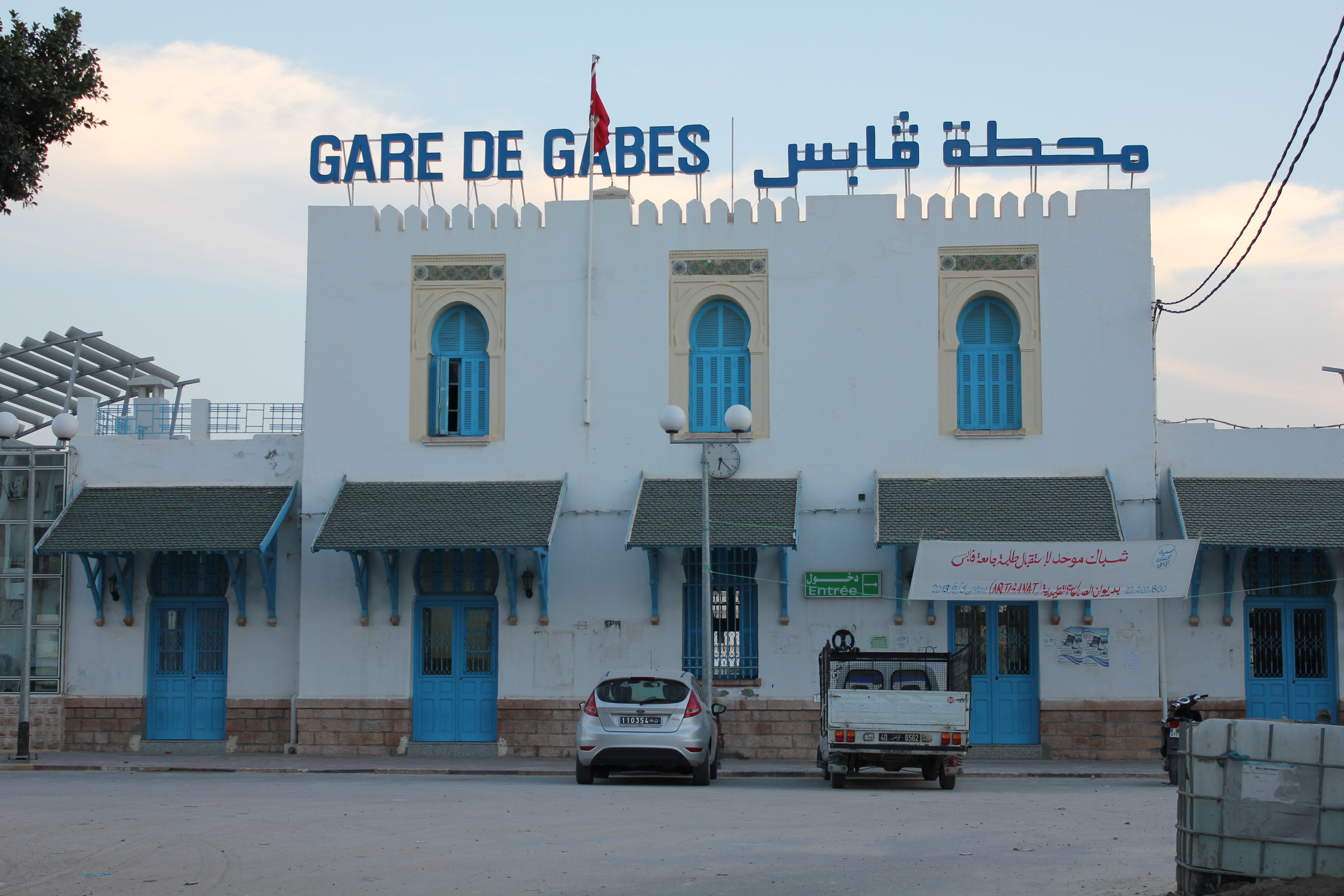
Gare of Gabès

Gabès – Matmata International Airport serves the city.

Gabès will soon be upgraded with one light rail system under the number 7 that will run from the railway station to the port of Gabès. Featuring rolling stock made by Alstom, Gabès will receive 15 new train sets.

=== Railways ===
Gabès is terminus of a narrow gauge 1,000 mm (3 ft 3 3/8 in) branch railway from the capital, and is the nearest railway station to the Libyan border at Ras Ajdir. Gabès has also one of the biggest ports in Tunisia; it is used usually to ship the mineral products from the city of Gafsa.

==== Roads ====
Gabès will be linked soon with the national motorway A1 (Tunis – Ras Ajdir).

== Climate ==
Gabès has a hot arid climate (Köppen climate classification BWh), bordering upon a hot semi-arid climate (BSh), characterised by hot summers and pleasant winters. Rainfall is low throughout the year and negligible during the hot summer.

Climate data for Gabès (1991–2020, extremes 1950–present)
Month	Jan	Feb	Mar	Apr	May	Jun	Jul	Aug	Sep	Oct	Nov	Dec	Year
Record high °C (°F)	29.3 (84.7)	33.9 (93.0)	41.0 (105.8)	38.2 (100.8)	43.6 (110.5)	46.5 (115.7)	49.1 (120.4)	46.6 (115.9)	44.2 (111.6)	40.9 (105.6)	35.0 (95.0)	31.2 (88.2)	46.7 (116.1)
Mean daily maximum °C (°F)	17.1 (62.8)	18.2 (64.8)	20.2 (68.4)	22.6 (72.7)	25.6 (78.1)	28.4 (83.1)	31.4 (88.5)	32.5 (90.5)	30.5 (86.9)	27.5 (81.5)	22.8 (73.0)	18.3 (64.9)	24.6 (76.3)
Daily mean °C (°F)	12.6 (54.7)	13.4 (56.1)	15.8 (60.4)	18.5 (65.3)	21.9 (71.4)	25.1 (77.2)	27.8 (82.0)	28.8 (83.8)	26.8 (80.2)	23.3 (73.9)	18.2 (64.8)	13.9 (57.0)	20.5 (68.9)
Mean daily minimum °C (°F)	8.1 (46.6)	8.6 (47.5)	11.5 (52.7)	14.5 (58.1)	18.3 (64.9)	21.8 (71.2)	24.2 (75.6)	25.1 (77.2)	23.2 (73.8)	19.1 (66.4)	13.6 (56.5)	9.4 (48.9)	16.5 (61.6)
Record low °C (°F)	−2.7 (27.1)	−2.0 (28.4)	0.9 (33.6)	4.6 (40.3)	8.2 (46.8)	12.0 (53.6)	15.6 (60.1)	16.8 (62.2)	14.4 (57.9)	6.8 (44.2)	2.6 (36.7)	0.0 (32.0)	−2.7 (27.1)
Average precipitation mm (inches)	24.4 (0.96)	12.0 (0.47)	17.1 (0.67)	16.8 (0.66)	10.4 (0.41)	1.9 (0.07)	0.5 (0.02)	3.1 (0.12)	30.1 (1.19)	30.7 (1.21)	18.7 (0.74)	23.9 (0.94)	189.5 (7.46)
Average precipitation days (≥ 1.0 mm)	2.9	2.3	2.0	2.0	1.5	0.5	0.0	0.3	2.1	3.0	2.1	2.5	21.2
Average relative humidity (%)	62	59	62	63	65	66	63	65	66	64	62	64	63
Mean monthly sunshine hours	214.1	226.8	251.9	274.1	308.4	322.2	354.0	335.1	259.4	247.8	218.1	211.1	3,223
Mean daily sunshine hours	7.1	7.7	8.1	8.9	10.1	10.7	12.0	11.4	9.3	8.4	7.6	6.8	9.0
Source 1: Institut National de la Météorologie (humidity 1961–1990, sun 1981-2010) (Note: The Station ID for Gabès is 46565111.)
Source 2: NOAA (humidity and daily sun 1961–1990)

Gabès mean sea temperature
Jan	Feb	Mar	Apr	May	Jun	Jul	Aug	Sep	Oct	Nov	Dec
16 (61)	15 (59)	16 (61)	17 (63)	19 (66)	22 (72)	26 (79)	28 (82)	27 (81)	25 (77)	22 (72)	18 (64)

== Culture ==
Gabès hosts a variety of cultural events that celebrate both its traditions and contemporary arts. One of the city's most notable cultural events is the Gabès Cinéma Fen, an annual film festival. Additionally, Gabès is home to the Bibliothèque régionale de Gabès, an institution promoting intellectual and cultural exchange. The library offers a wide range of resources and frequently hosts cultural events, workshops, and educational programs for the local community.

== Tourism ==
=== Main sights ===
Gabès is famous for its traditional Souqs in Jarah; it is known also for its beach and the unusual seaside oasis (Gabès is located on the coast of the Mediterranean).

The most visited place in Gabès is the town Matmata.

Among the city's historical and religious landmarks, the Mosque of Sidi Boulbaba and The Mouradi school are the most notable. Also, The Zaouia of Sidi Ahmed Toujani, which is associated with the Tijani Sufi order and remains a center for spiritual gatherings.

=== World Heritage Status ===
This Oasis of Gabès was added to the UNESCO World Heritage Tentative List on May 28, 2008, in the Cultural category.

== Gallery ==
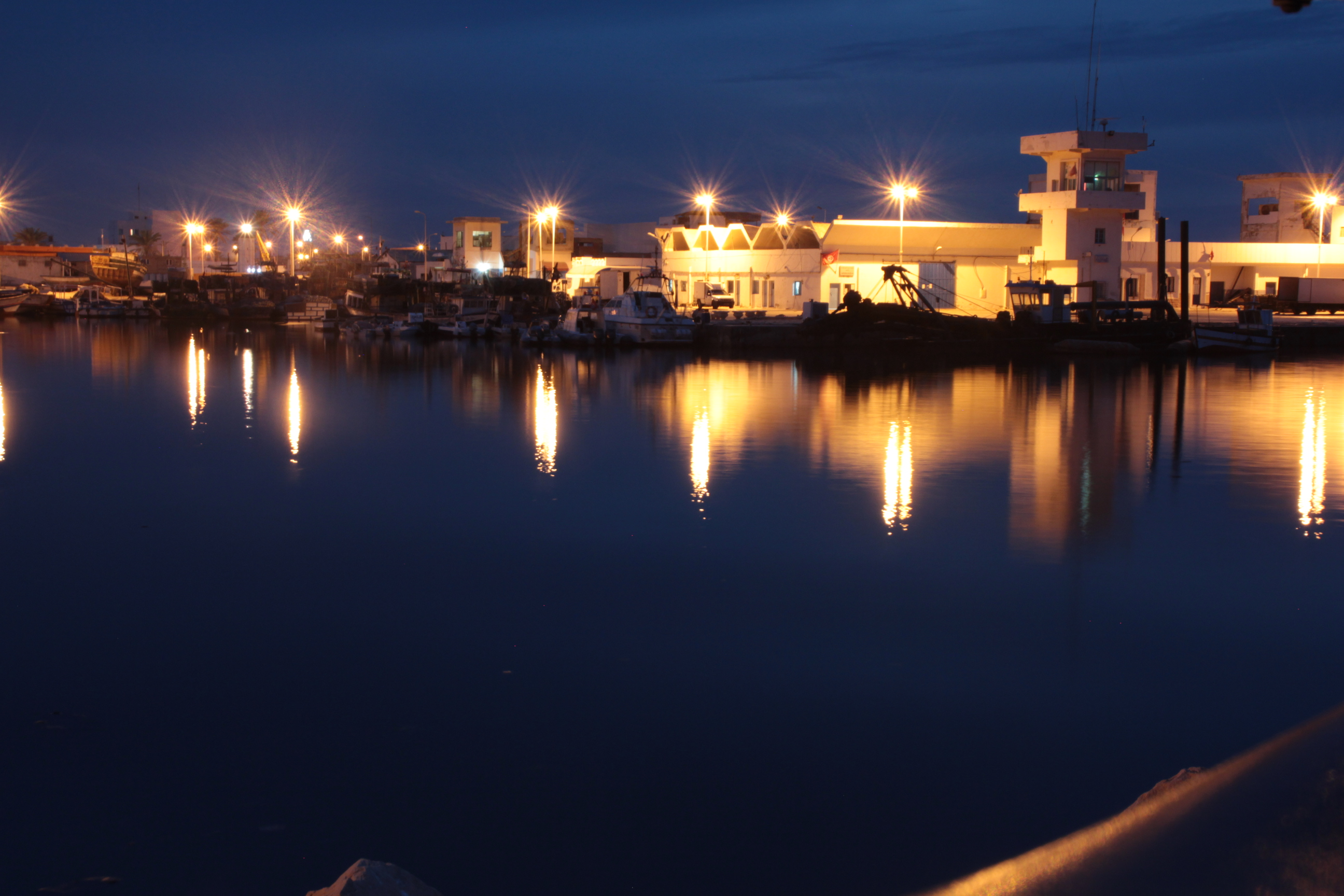

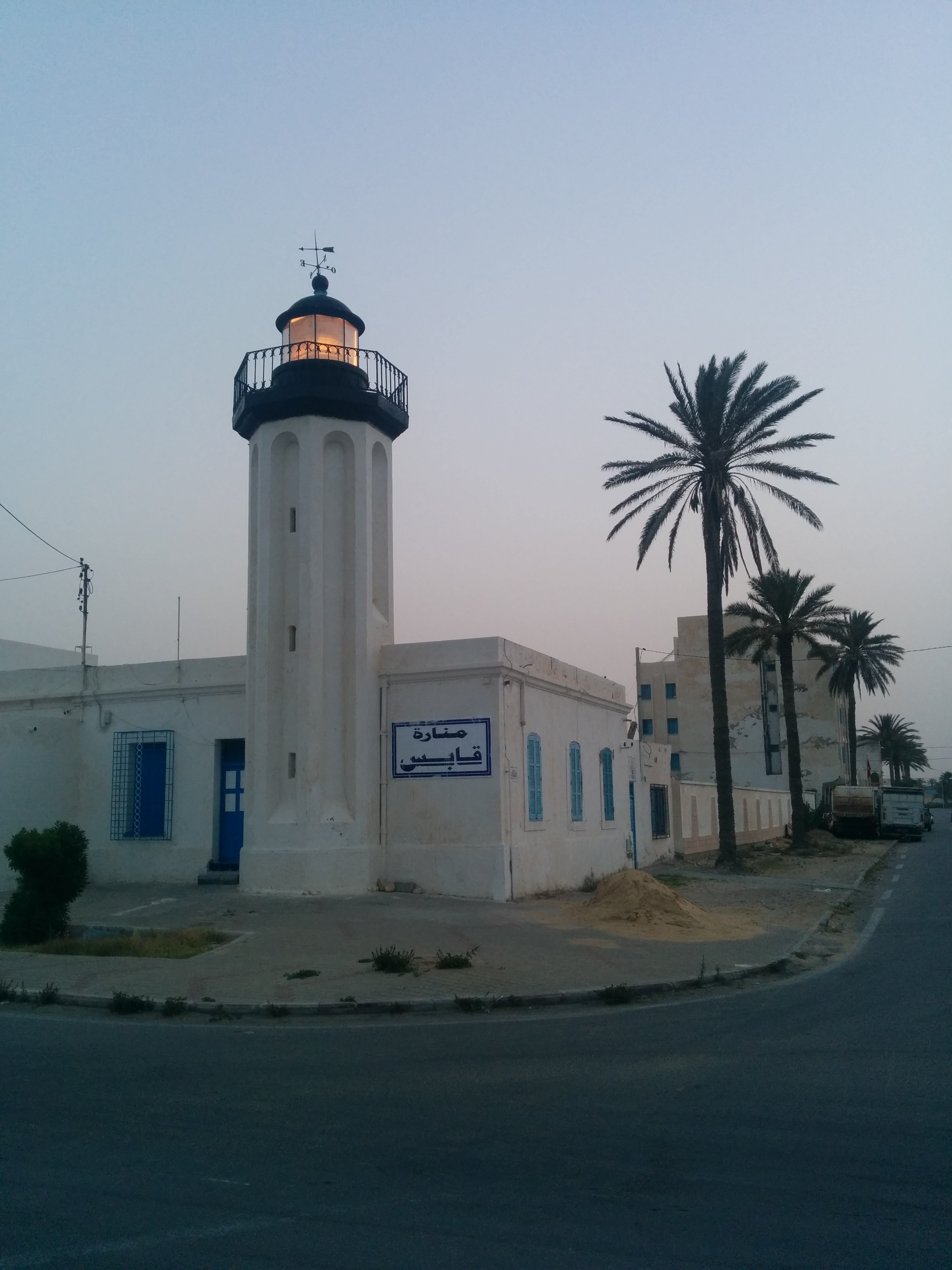

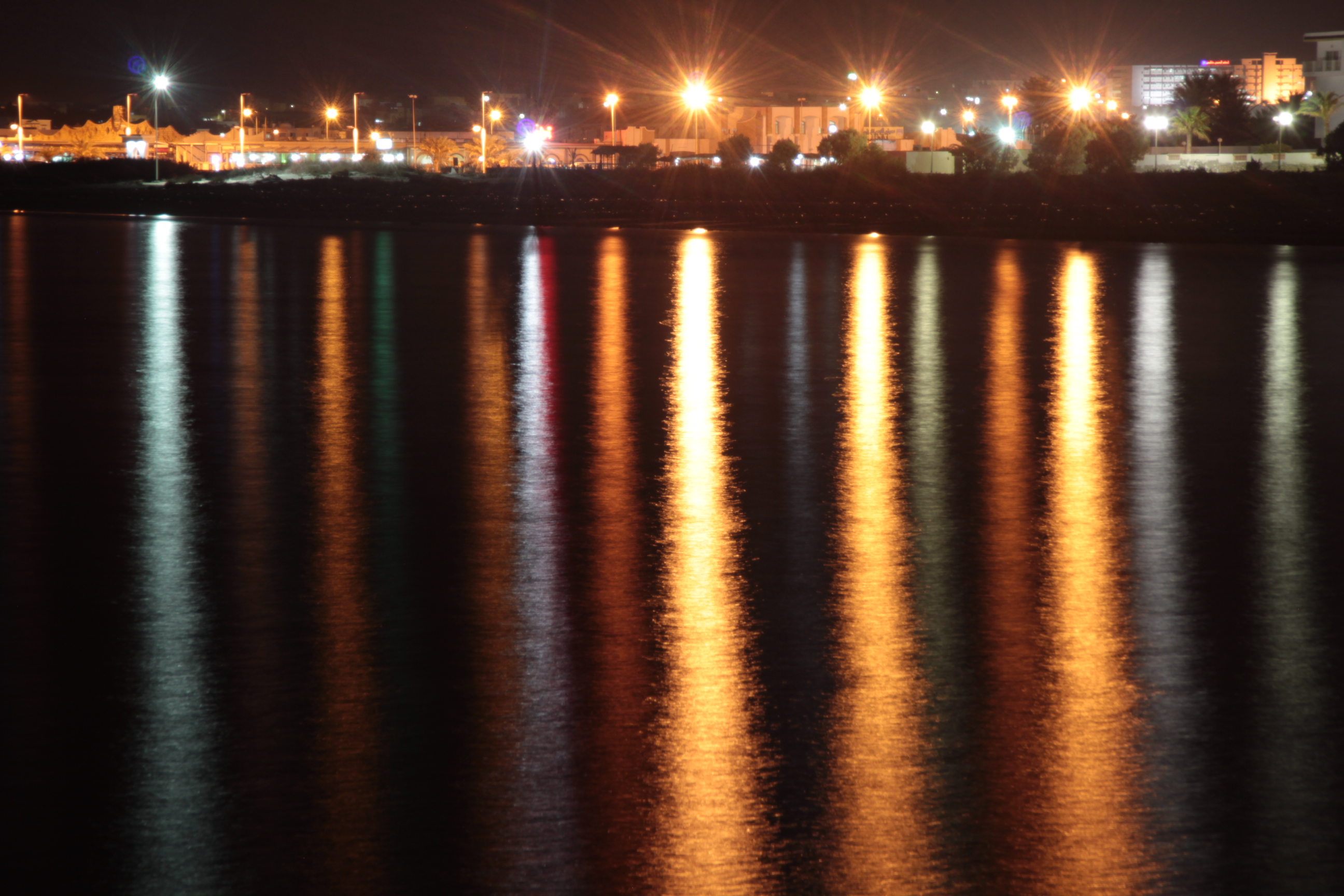
Korniche of Gabès

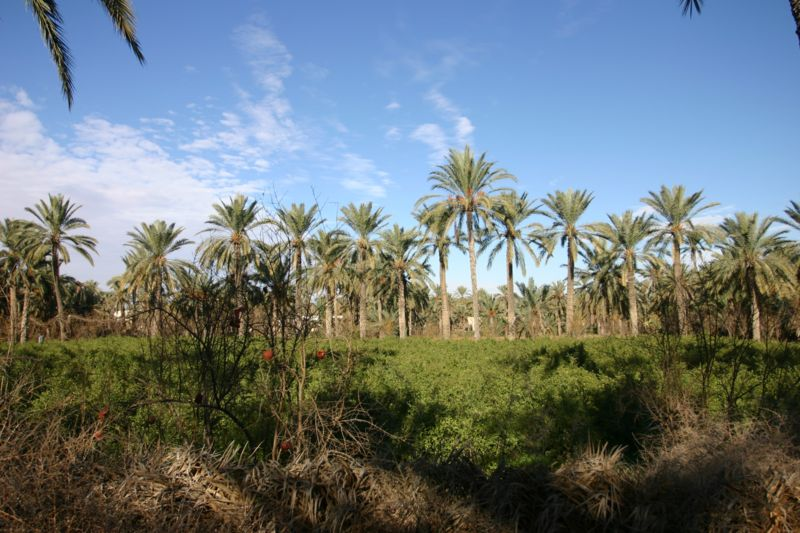

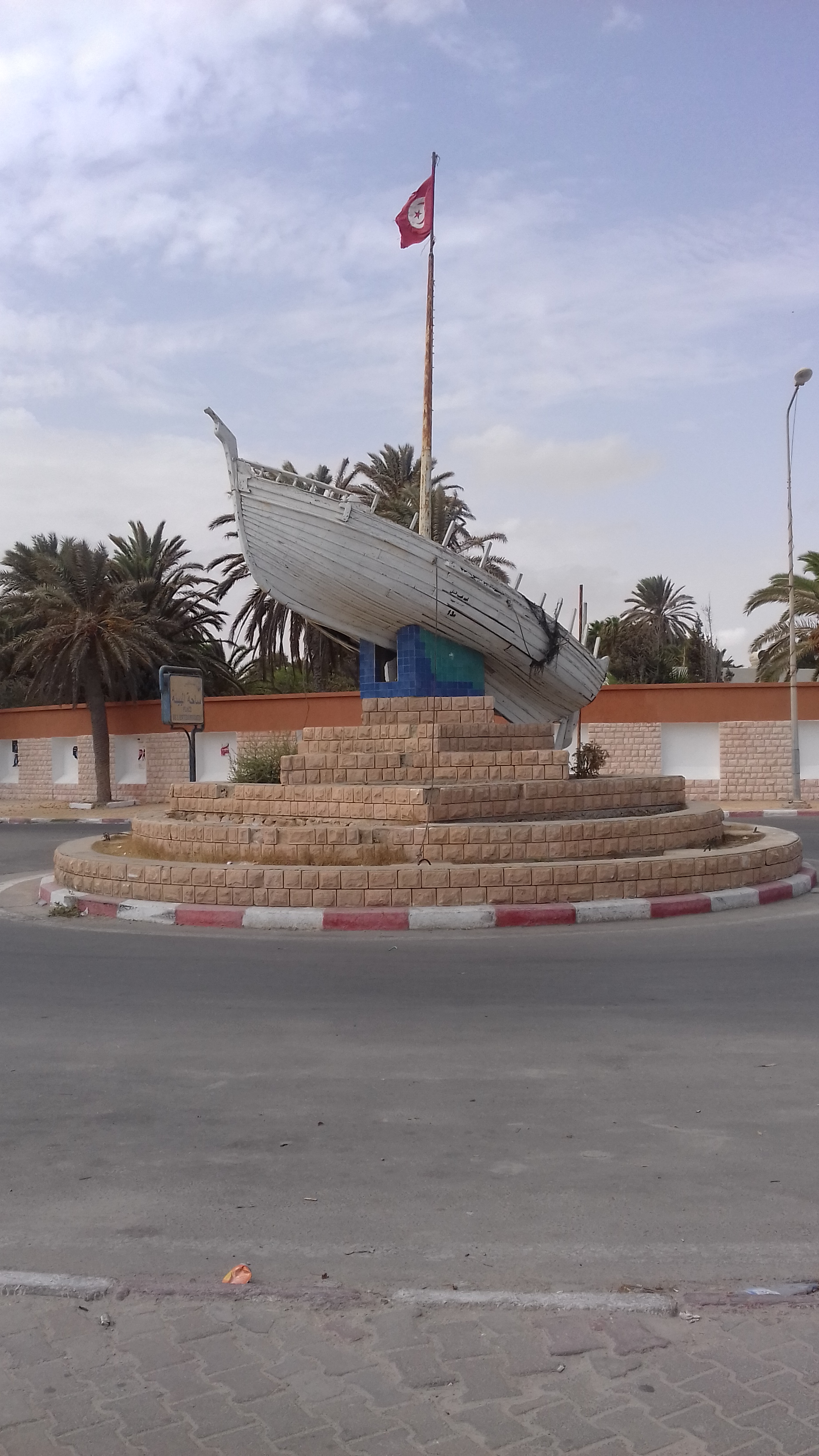
Bab Bhar

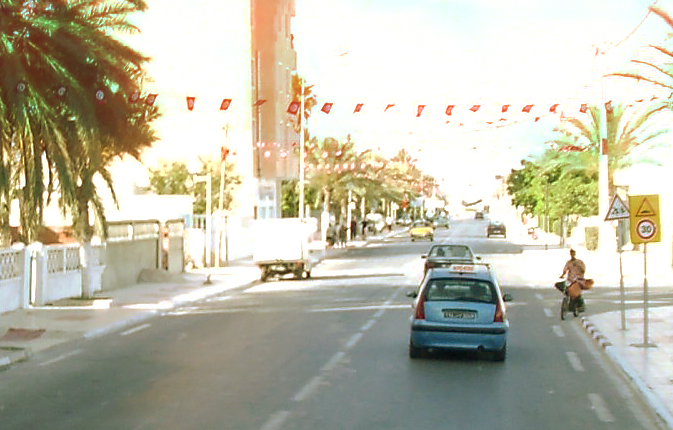

== Notable people ==
- Gladys Adda, activist, was born here in 1921
- Juliette Bessis, Tunisian historian, was born here (1925–2017)
- Silvan Shalom, Israeli politician, former minister and Knesset member
- Tahar Haddad, writer, feminist advocator, activist, reformer (1899–1935)
- Mohamed Ali El Hammi, one of the founding fathers of Tunisian syndicalism, an activist (1890–1928)

== See also ==
- Gabès Governorate, one of the twenty-four governorates (provinces) of Tunisia
- Gulf of Gabès
- University of Gabès, a public university
- List of cities in Tunisia
