= Affoussiata Bamba-Lamine =

Ivorian lawyer and politician

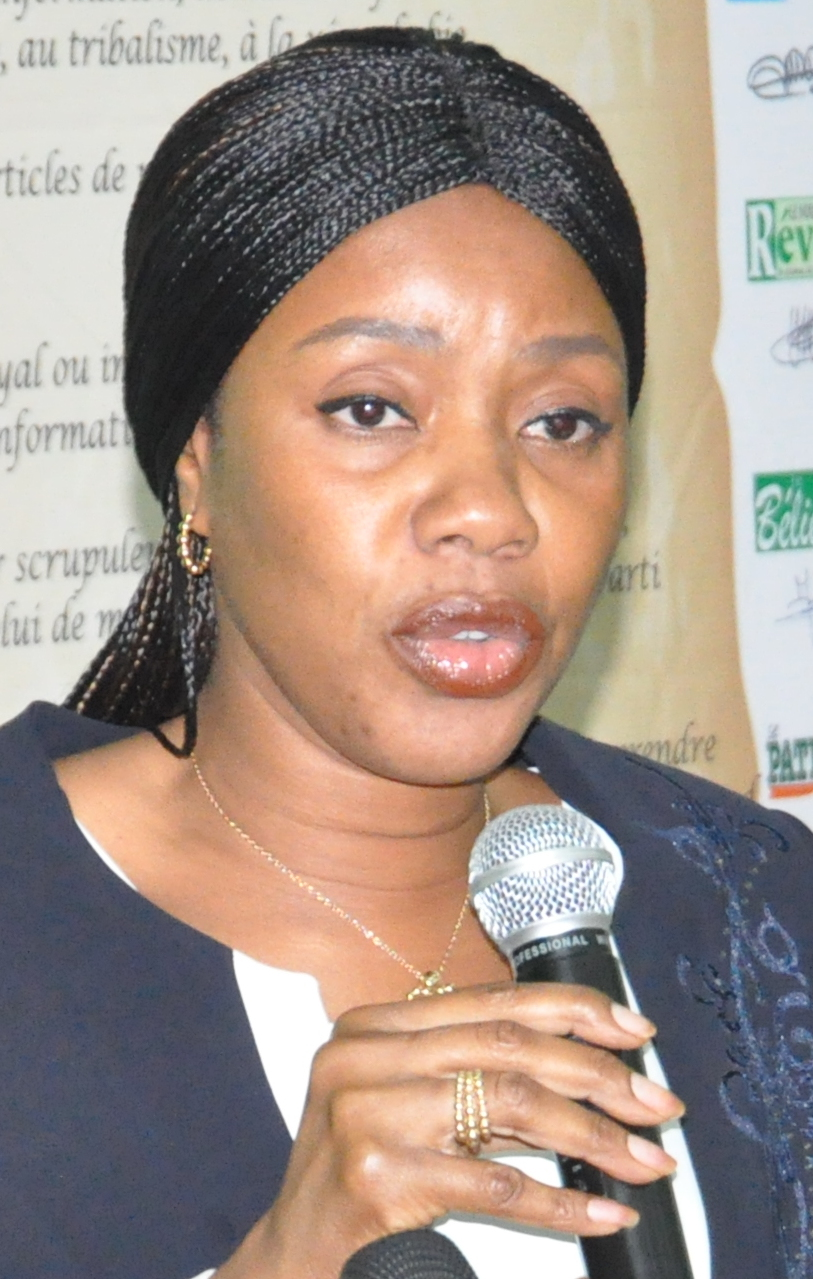
- Affoussiata Bamba-Lamine in 2015

Minister of Communication
- In office December 2012 – January 2017
- Succeeded by: Kone Bruno

National Assembly Member (Abobo)
- In office 2011–2016

Legal Advisor, Ministry of Communication
- In office 2007–2012

Personal details
- Born: 23 June 1970 (age 55) Abidjan, Ivory Coast
- Party: Rally of the Republicans
- Children: 2
- Education: Robert Schuman University; University of Paris X (LL.M.); Nancy 2 University (PhD)
- Occupation: Lawyer, politician
- Awards: National Order of the Ivory Coast

Affoussiata Bamba-Lamine (born 23 June 1970) is an Ivorian politician who served as a Minister of Communication from December 2012 until January 2017.

== Early life and education ==
Bamba-Lamine was born on 23 June 1970 in Abidjan. Her father, Moriféré Bamba, was Minister of Communication during Alassane Ouattara’s mandate. She has a law degree from the Robert Schuman University in Strasbourg, a master's degree in law from the University of Paris X and a doctorate in comparative law from the Nancy 2 University in France.

== Career ==
Bamba-Lamine practiced law in France, becoming a member of the Paris bar in 2001.

In 2002, Bamba-Lamine became a legal advisor in the Ministry of Communication, and served in the Prime Minister's office from 2007 to 2012. During the 2010–11 Ivorian crisis, she participated in the Forces Nouvelles and served as a legal advisor to Guillaume Soro.

Bamba-Lamine was elected to the National Assembly for the commune of Abobo representing the Rally of the Republicans in 2011, the only woman newly entering government at that time. She was then elected President of the Commission of General and International Affairs. She was appointed Minister of Communication on 22 November 2012, and deputy spokesperson for the government. In May 2016, she announced a process for the liberalisation of television in the Ivory Coast.

At the 2016 election, Bamba-Lambine stood for the commune of Cocody, where she was defeated by former PDCI member turned independent Yasmina Ouegnin, who received 57% of the vote to Bamba-Lambine's 32%. She then resigned as Minister of Communications and was succeeded by Kone Bruno on 10 January 2017.

== Awards and honors ==
Bamba-Lamine was made a knight of the National Order of the Ivory Coast in 2013.

== Personal life ==
Bamba-Lamine is married and has two children.
