= Sophie Bessis =

French-Tunisian historian and feminist author

- صوفي بسيس
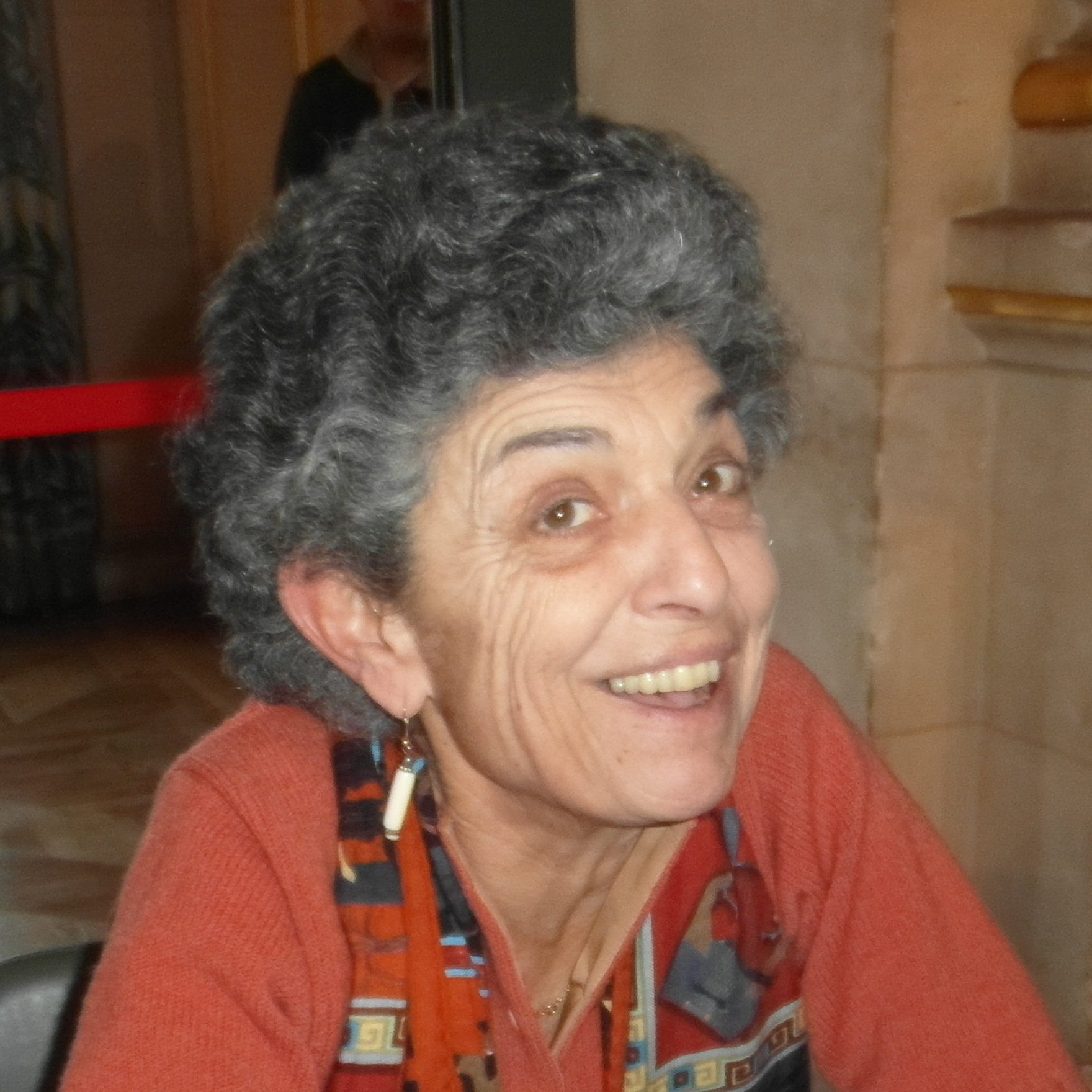
- Sophie Bessis (2015)
- Born: 1947 (age 78–79); Tunis
- Occupations: journalist, historian, writer
- Known for: Journalism, works on feminism in the Arab world
- Notable work: Western Supremacy: The Triumph of an Idea
- Movement: Tunisian feminist movement
- Awards: Commandeur of the Order of the Republic (Tunisia), 2016

Sophie Bessis (Arabic: صوفي بسيس , 1947) is a Tunisian-born French historian, journalist, researcher, and feminist author. She has written numerous works in French, Spanish, and English on development in the Maghreb and the Arab world, as well as on the situation of women and sociocultural inequalities to which they are subjected. She is the recipient of the Paris Liège literary prize and was honored in Tunisia as Commandeur of the Order of the Republic.

A history scholar and former editor-in-chief of the weekly magazine Jeune Afrique, Bessis has worked as research associate at the Institute for International and Strategic Relations (IRIS) in Paris and Deputy Secretary-General of the International Federation for Human Rights Leagues (FIDH). She has taught political economy of development at the Department of Political Science at the Sorbonne university and the Institut national des langues et civilisations orientales (INALCO). Further, she has been a consultant for UNESCO and UNICEF and has carried out numerous missions in Africa.

== Biography ==
Bessis was born in Tunis in 1947. Her family was part of the Jewish upper middle class. She is the daughter of Juliette Bessis, a historian, professor, and researcher who specialized in the Maghreb and was a Communist militant; and Aldo Bessis, a trade unionist member of the Union syndicale des travailleurs de Tunisie and an expert for the U.N. Food and Agriculture Organization (FAO).

Bessis moved to France in 1975, where she studied history and worked as a journalist. She worked as the former editor of the weekly Jeune Afrique. She has been professor of political economy of development in the department of political science at the Sorbonne and INALCO. As a consultant for UNESCO and UNICEF, she participated in numerous missions in Africa. She is the director of research at the Institute of International and Strategic Relations (IRIS) of Paris and deputy general secretary of the International Federation for Human Rights (FIDH).

Bessis is the author of numerous works including a biography of Habib Bourguiba, written with Souhayr Belhassen. In 2007, she published Les Arabes, les femmes, la liberté ("The Arabs, the women, the freedom") which reviewed the legacy of the Egyptian reformers of the early twentieth century and of Bourguiba, who enacted in 1956 a law that gave rights to Tunisian women. Further, she analyzed the changes in Arab societies and the shortcomings of modernization connected with the rise of Islamists and the return to an identity based solely on religious norms. In particular, Bessis denounced what she called the "identity imprisonment" to which women are subjected in the Arab world.

In 2017, she published Les Valeureuses ou Cinq Tunisiennes dans l’Histoire, in which she recounted the biography of important women in Tunisian history. These women are Elissa, the founding Phoenician princess of Carthage (also known as Dido/Didon); the singer and Jewish actress Habiba Msika, who in the 1920s became Tunisia's most popular artist; Aïcha Sayida Manoubia, the "free saint" of the thirteenth century recognized by the Sufi tradition; Aziza Othmana, a legendary Tunisian-Ottoman princess of the seventeenth century; and the feminist Habiba Menchari, whose conference in January 1929 against the use of the Islamic veil shocked Habib Bourguiba.

In 2017, Bessis announced the donation of her parents' library, a collection of books and newspapers on the history of Tunisia and the Maghreb, to the National Library of Tunis.

== Awards ==
- 2015, Paris Liège literary prize for La Double impasse : l'universel à l'épreuve des fondamentalismes religieux et marchand.
- 2016, Commandeur de l’Ordre de la République of Tunisia

== Selected works ==
=== In French ===
- L’Arme alimentaire, Paris, Maspero, 1979 (ISBN 978-2-707-11109-8)
- La Dernière Frontière : les tiers-mondes et la tentation de l'Occident, Paris, Jean-Claude Lattès, 1983 (notice BnF n^{o} FRBNF34725538)
- Femmes du Maghreb l'enjeu, Paris, Jean-Claude Lattès, 1983 (ISBN 978-2-709-61121-3)
- Habib Bourguiba : biographie en deux volumes, Paris, Jeune Afrique, 1988 ; réed. Elyzad, Tunis, 20124
- Mille et une bouches, Paris, Autrement, 1995 (ISBN 978-2-862-60528-9)
- L’Occident et les Autres : histoire d’une suprématie, Paris, La Découverte, 2003 (ISBN 978-2-707-14255-9)
- Les Arabes, les femmes, la liberté, Paris, Albin Michel, 2007
- Dedans, dehors, Tunis, Elyzad, 2010 (ISBN 978-9-973-58028-3)
- La Double impasse : l'universel à l'épreuve des fondamentalismes religieux et marchand, Paris, La Découverte, coll. " Cahiers libres ", 2014(ISBN 978-9-973-58028-3)
- Les Valeureuses : cinq Tunisiennes dans l'histoire, Tunis, Elyzad, 2017 (ISBN 978-9-973-58090-0)
- La civilisation judéo-chrétienne : anatomie d'une imposture, Paris, Les Liens qui libèrent, 2025 (ISBN 979-1020922908)

=== In Spanish ===
- Mujeres del Magreb, lo que está en juego (1994) Editorial Horas y horas
- El hambre en el mundo (1994)
- Occidente y los otros: historia de una supremacía. (2002) Alianza Editorial
- Las emergencias del mundo: economía, poder alteridad (2005) Nobel
- Los árabes, las mujeres, la libertad (2007) Alianza Editorial
- Mujer y familia en las sociedades árabes actuales. (2010) Editorial Bellaterra

=== In English ===
- Equal inheritance for daughters is key to Tunisian women's empowerment
- Western Supremacy: The Triumph of an Idea Zed Books, 2003

== See also ==
- Bochra Belhaj Hmida
