= 1941 anti-Jewish riots in Gabès =

Gabès riots (1941)
- Location: Gabès, French protectorate of Tunisia
- Date: May 1941
- Target: Tunisian Jews
- Deaths: 7 Jews
- Injuries: 20 Jews injured
- Motive: Retaliation for an attack on an Arab by a group of Jews; Antisemitism

The Gabès riots (May 19–20, 1941) targeted the Jewish community in Gabès, Tunisia. A notable exception to the relatively good Jewish-Muslim relations in the city, it was the worst outbreak of violence against Jews in North Africa during World War II.

== Background ==
Gabes, like al-Qayrawan, had been an important Jewish center during the Middle Ages. Though there were frequent attacks from Bedouins from the hinterland, Jewish-Muslim relations in Gabes were relatively good. The community of Gabes was under the influence of Djerba, which opposed foreign influence and did not allow the establishment of any Alliance Israélite Universelle schools.

Haim Houri, Chief Rabbi of Gabes, supported Zionism and was well connected with rabbinical colleagues in Mandatory Palestine. Though rabbis of Gabes had a favorable view of Zionism, there was no organized Zionist movement in Gabes until after World War II, with ḤerutṢion and Betar, and the Gabes Zionists did not vote in the World Zionist Congresses of 1931, 1933, or even 1946.

== History ==
Haim Saadoun describes the riots of 1941 in the Encyclopedia of Jews in the Islamic World as follows:

According to Italian reports, the disturbance began on the evening of May 19, when an Arab man harassed some Jewish girls. Four young Jews subsequently attacked the Arab. The next day a group of Arabs retaliated, killing seven Jews and wounding twenty. The riot was finally quelled by the French on the afternoon of May 20. It is difficult to ascertain whether it was an isolated incident or whether it was a sign of increasing tensions between the communities. Historians remain divided on the impact of the riot on subsequent Jewish-Muslim relations. Poems written by Jews after the riot, expressing profound sadness and a desire for revenge, demonstrate that it made an indelible impact on the collective memory of the Jewish community of Gabes.

Along with the 7 Jews initially killed, one policemen was also killed.

Robert Satloff described the riots as a pogrom that began with an attack of thirty Arabs on a synagogue who may have been motivated by the potential fall of the pro-Nazi Prime Minister Rashid Ali al-Gaylani in Iraq.

== Yad Vashem testimonies ==
Satloff cites the Yad Vashem testimony of Tzvi Hadadd, a Jew from Gabès who remembered his mother rushing outside to look for his sister, only to be assaulted as she stepped out the front door. Hadadd recalled:

"An Arab knocked her down and another grabbed her and tried to cut her throat."

According to Irit Abramski of Yad Vashem, based on 6 eyewitness testimonies recorded by Yad Vashem, dozens of men with knives and coshes "massacred every Jew they could find" and ransacked Jewish homes and villages in the Djara quarter. Other eyewitnesses reported that victims' neighbors broke into the houses where Jews were hiding, killed them, and stole the Jews' items. A Jew from Gabès, Tzvi Hadadd, remembered his mother rushing outside to look for his sister, only to be assaulted as she stepped out the front door.

== Bibliography ==
- Abramski-Bligh Irit, Drevon Claire, « L’influence de la Seconde Guerre mondiale sur les relations judéo-arabes en Libye et en Tunisie », Revue d’Histoire de la Shoah, 2016/2 (N° 205), p. 317-353. DOI : 10.3917/rhsho.205.0317. URL : https://www.cairn.info/revue-revue-d-histoire-de-la-shoah-2016-2-page-317.htm

== See also ==
- Farhud
- Antisemitism in the Arab world
- Islam and antisemitism
