= National Order of the Ivory Coast =

Highest state order of the Ivory Coast

National Order of the Ivory Coast Ordre National de la Côte d'Ivoire
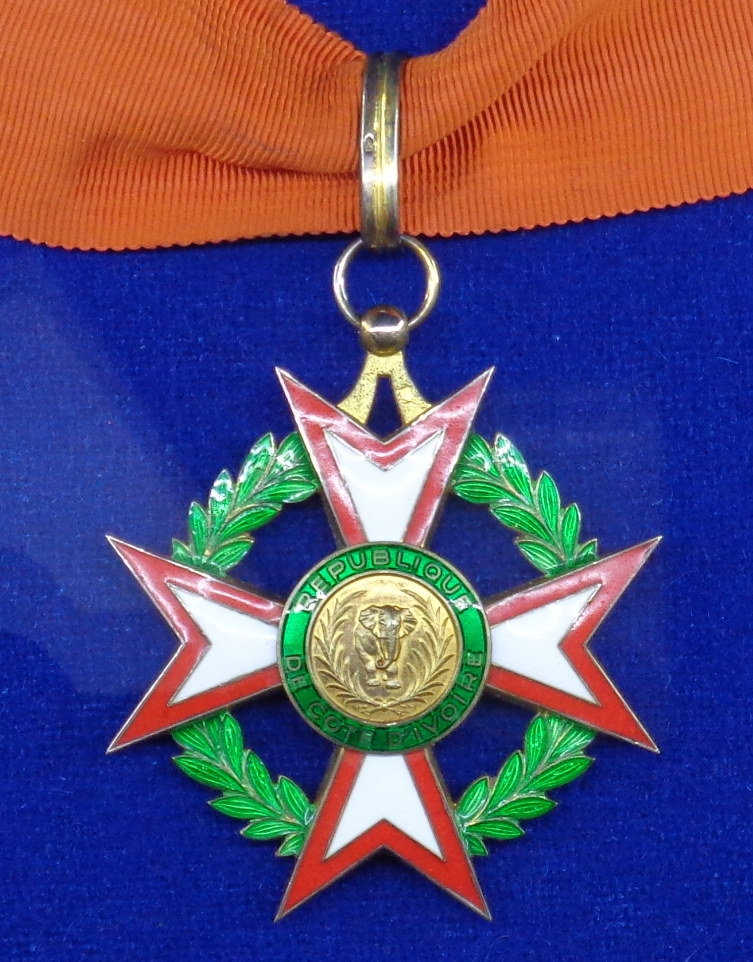
- Grand Officer's badge

Awarded by Ivory Coast
- Type: State Order
- Established: 10 April 1961
- Awarded for: Meritorious service to the state.
- Classes: Collar; Grand Cross; Grand Officer; Commander; Officer; Knight

Precedence
- Next (higher): None
- Next (lower): Order of Ivory Merit
- Ribbon bar of the order

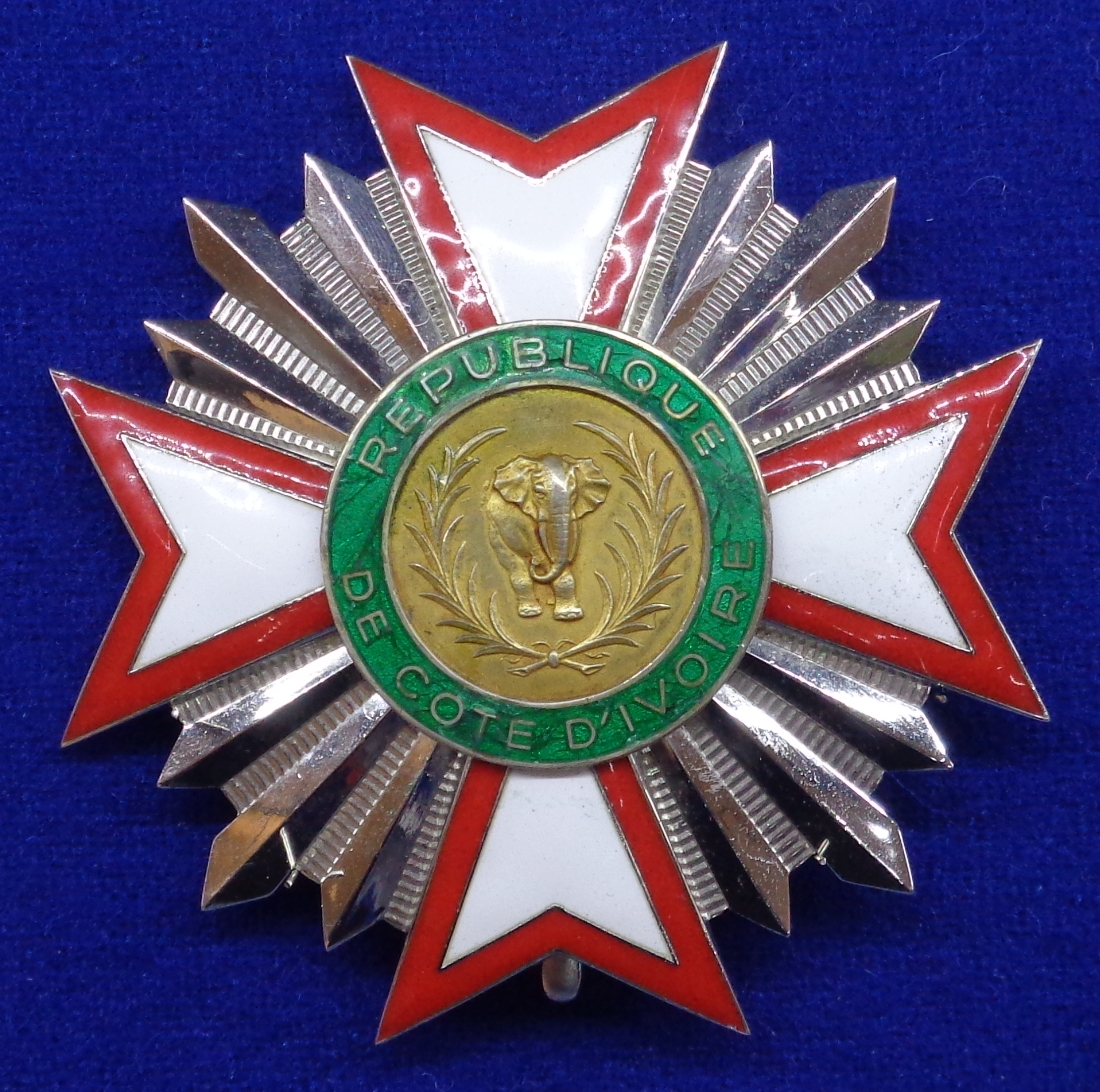
Grand Officer Star of the order

The National Order of the Ivory Coast (sometimes simply mentioned as National Order) is the highest state order of knighthood of the Ivory Coast.

== History ==
The Order was founded on 10 April 1961 to celebrate the independence of the Ivory Coast which was until 1960 a French colony. As the highest state honour, it is awarded to those who have highly distinguished themselves to the service to the state. The Collar is awarded solely to foreign heads of state.

== Insignia ==
The medal of the order is constituted of a white-enamelled cross of Malta, bordered in red, surrounded by a green crown of laurel. At the centre of the cross in a gold medallion showing a frontal elephant surrounded by a crown of laurel, the whole surrounded by a green-enamelled ring with golden inscription "REPUBLIQUE DE COTE D'IVOIRE" ("Republic of Ivory Coast").

The plaque shows the same design as the medal but the cross is put upon a silver radiating star.

The ribbon of the order is dark orange.

== Grades ==
The Order is subdivided in five ordinary grades, plus a special class of the Collar:

- Collar
- Grand Cross
- Grand Officer
- Commander
- Officer
- Knight

== Recipients ==
- Affoussiata Bamba-Lamine
- Marie-Thérèse Bocoum
- Jean-Bédel Bokassa
- André Chouraqui
- Jacques Diouf
- Sadio Gassama
- Édouard Guillaud
- Gaylord Harnwell
- Jean Herly
- Festus Mogae
- Mike Moore (New Zealand politician)
- Samuel L. Myers Sr.
- Ahmadou Lamine Ndiaye
- Jacqueline Oble
- Benoît Puga
- Bernard Rogel
- Fadika Sarra Sako
- Hamad bin Khalifa Al Thani
- Nouréini Tidjani-Serpos
- Arthur Young (police officer)
- Joseph Boayue, former Liberian Secretary of Public Works
- Grand Crosses
  - Aga Khan IV
  - Akihito
  - Beatrix of the Netherlands
  - Jean-Bédel Bokassa
  - Elizabeth II
  - Levi Eshkol
  - Princess Margriet of the Netherlands
  - Pranab Mukherjee
  - Recep Tayyip Erdoğan
  - Hamad bin Khalifa Al Thani
  - Pieter van Vollenhoven
