= Tijjani =

Tijjani is a given name. Notable people with the name include:

- Tijjani Yahaya Kaura (born 1959), Nigerian politician
- Tijjani Muhammad-Bande (born 1957), Nigerian diplomat and political scientist
- Tijjani Noslin (born 1999), Dutch footballer
- Tijjani Reijnders (born 1998), Dutch footballer
- Ahmed Tijjani Mora (born 1956), Nigerian pharmacist

== See also ==
- Tijani (given name)
- Tijani (disambiguation)
