= Juliette Bessis =

Tunisian historian and academic

- Born: Juliette Saada; 16 September 1925; Gabès, Tunisia
- Died: 18 March 2017 (aged 91); Paris, France
- Occupations: Tunisian scholar, historian
- Known for: Maghreb history research
- Spouse: Aldo Bessis (1918-1969)
- Children: Sophie, Sandra

Juliette Bessis (Arabic: جولييت بسيس; b. 1925 in Gabès, Tunisia - 2017 in Paris, France) was a contemporary Tunisian scholar and historian specializing in the Maghreb region of northern Africa.

== Life ==
Born Juliette Saada on 16 September 1925, she was part of a Tunisian Jewish upper middle-class family in the southern region of Tunisia, which at the time was under French colonial rule.

=== Early life ===
At the age of 17, she became active in the Tunisian Communist Party, promoting anti-fascist struggles and resisting the German occupation of Tunisia from November 1942 to May 1943. During that time, she met Aldo Bessis (1918-1969) and they married on 3 February 1944, but she did not change her last name to Bessis until her first daughter Sophie Bessis was born.

After studying at the Lycée Armand Fallières (now known as Lycée de la Rue de Russie) in Tunis and Bessis studied at Ecole des Hautes Etudes de Tunis, which later became Tunis University (affiliated with the Sorbonne in Paris), and earned her bachelor's degree in the early 1950s. In 1956, she was appointed professor at the Khaznadar annex of Sadiki College. A specialist in contemporary Maghreb history, her research focused on fascist politics in the Mediterranean, Tunisian trade unionism and contemporary Libya. She earned her Ph.D. in contemporary history at the Sorbonne.

Bessis was a teacher at the Khaznadar high school until 1962.

=== After Tunisia ===
In 1962, when the Tunisian civil service began purging its senior ranks of Jewish officials, the Bessis family left Tunisia, moving first to Cameroon where Aldo joined the United Nations agency for food and agriculture (FAO). There Juliette became a Unesco expert and was named professor of history in Yaoundé at the Ecole normale supérieure, which was part of the French university system. In 1964, the family moved to Addis Ababa, Ethiopia for a few months before Aldo Bessis was reassigned to FAO headquarters in Rome. Soon after that, the family relocated to Geneva where Aldo died in 1969. Juliette and her daughters finally moved to Paris in 1972.

Throughout her life, Bessis researched fascist politics in the Mediterranean and documented Mussolini's ambitions to reestablish, under his rule, the ancient Roman Empire. Her research formed the basis of her book titled La Méditerranée Fasciste (The Fascist Mediterranean) describing. Mussolini's Italy and its influence on Tunisia before and during the Second World War.

She subsequently taught in Paris at the Institute of Political Studies, often called Sciences Po, and at the University of Paris-VIII.

=== Death ===
Juliette Bessis died on 18 March 2017 at the age of 91 in Paris.

In 2017, her daughter Sophie Bessis announced that she had donated her parents' library, a collection of books and newspapers on the history of Tunisia and the Maghreb, to the National Library of Tunis.

== Selected publications ==
- Bessis, Juliette. "Le Mouvement ouvrier tunisien: de ses origines à l'indépendance." Le mouvement social (1974): 85-108.
- Bessis, Juliette. "Chekib Arslan et les mouvements nationalistes au Maghreb." Revue historique 259.Fasc. 2 (526 (1978): 467-489.
- Bessis, Juliette. La Méditerranée fasciste: l'Italie mussolinienne et la Tunisie. Vol. 15. Karthala Editions, 1981.
- Bessis, Juliette. "Sur Moncef Bey et le moncéfisme: La Tunisie de 1942 à 1948." Outre-Mers. Revue d'histoire 70.260 (1983): 97-131.
- Bessis, Juliette. Revue D'histoire Moderne Et Contemporaine (1954-), vol. 32, no. 4, 1985, pp. 697–699. JSTOR, www.jstor.org/stable/20529189. Accessed 7 Apr. 2021.
- Bessis, Juliette. "La politique américaine en Afrique du Nord pendant la seconde guerre mondiale." Revue des mondes musulmans et de la Méditerranée 36.1 (1983): 147-161.
- Bessis, Juliette. "Ebrei in un paese arabo: Gli ebrei nella Libia contemporanea tra colonialismo, nazionalismo arabo e sionismo (1935-1970)." (1985): 695-697.
- Bessis, Juliette. "L'Opposition France-etats-Unis au Maghreb de la Deuxième Guerre Mondiale jusqu'a l'indépendance des protectorats 1941–1956." Les Chemins de la Décolonisation de l'Empire coloniale français (1986): 341-56.
