= Ismaël Tidjani Serpos =

Beninese politician (born 1948)

Ismaël Tidjani Serpos (born 22 May 1948 in Allada, Benin) was a member of the Pan-African Parliament from Benin.

He was vice-president and member of Adrien Houngbédji's Party for Democratic Renewal (PRD).

He was also a former Minister of Justice under former President Mathieu Kérékou.

He is the younger brother of Professor, poet, and former Beninese Ambassador to UNESCO, Nouréini Tidjani Serpos.

Serpos died on Friday, 8 November 2019.

== See also ==
- List of members of the Pan-African Parliament
