= Western Supremacy (book) =

Book article

Western Supremacy: The Triumph of an Idea?
- Cover
- Author: Sophie Bessis
- Publisher: Bloomsbury Publishing
- Publication date: April 2003
- Media type: Print (hardback)
- Pages: 304
- ISBN: 9781842772188

Western Supremacy: The Triumph of an Idea? is a 2003 non-fiction book about development studies, international relations and sociology. The original work L’Occident et les Autres: histoire d’une suprématie was written in French by award-winning French-Tunisian historian, journalist, researcher, and feminist author Sophie Bessis.

== Summary ==
According to the publisher, Bessis tells the story of "the West's relationship with the world it came to dominate - from the conquest of the Americas, through the slave trade and the Scramble for Africa, the White Man's burden, Manifest destiny and the growth of scientific racism, to decolonisation, the ideology of development and structural adjustment. Western Supremacy is an introduction to the history of colonial and developmentalist thought. Starting with the Enlightenment idea of universalism it traces how this facilitated a notion of the West rooted in a Hellenic inheritance systematically devoid of Egyptian or Arab influences. Though the hierarchy of races has now given way to the hierarchy of development, Bessis argues that developmentalism is the new incarnation of the West's paradoxical aspiration to lead the world into universalism whilst maintaining its own supremacy.

Attempts to emulate the Western model have had devastating consequences for the South. Human rights, democracy and justice, in theory at least, have become accepted throughout the world. Yet those who pride themselves on having invented this universality still lay claim to some privileged right to define its content. Bessis highlights the hypocrisy with which the North applies these standards: one standard for China, with its huge potential market, another for minor African states, one for Muslim oppression of women in Teheran, another in Riyadh. In other words, human rights are still entirely subordinate to economic interest."

Development of the Others is tolerated on the condition that it does not interfere with the West's interests. Bessis concludes by exploring reactions within developing countries to the historically unprecedented attempt to remake the world in the West's own image. According to the author, the West's inability to embrace pluralism and multivocality undermines its very strength and the rightful existence and legitimate place that non-western peoples have in the world. Bessis concludes by asking the poignant question of how do we collectively move from a unitary domination by the West to a body of ideas and a discourse in which all members of humanity can recognize themselves and share in its construction.

== Table of contents ==
=== Part 1: The formation of a culture ===
- 1. The West Is Born : Birth of a myth - The horsemen of the Apocalypse - The bleeding of Africa
- 2. Light and Shadow of the Enlightenment : America and slavery - Limited universality - A moment of hesitation
- 3. The Roots of a Conviction : The proof by race... - ...and its applications - In the name of civilization - Europeanizing the world - The limits of progress
- 4. Continuity beneath Wrenching Changes : The textbook world - Communist contradictions - Around Nazism - Colonial upheavals - The period of doubts - Alternative messiahs? - An economic model
- 5. The Backlash : A new discourse - From the restoration of myths - ...to the rewriting of histories - The end of an era?

=== Part 2: The way of the world ===
- 6. The Great Post-Colonial Illusion : The 'development decades' - Two variants of a single model - The State as demiurge - Beneficiaries in the South
- 7. The New Basis of Hegemony : The constancy of wealth - The debt economy - The debt dividend - Crisis and adjustment programmes - Technologies of constraint
- 8. The Privileges of Power : Making use of liberalism - The loaded dice of free trade - Some more equal than others - A huge bill - Immigration, memory and amnesia - Barriers against the Other - Vagaries of the right to asylum - A model in question
- 9. Beginning of the End? : Hegemony wounded - A grouping of enemies - Troubles in the North - The incarnation of evil - Nostalgia for the State - Winners and losers

=== Part 3: The two sides of the mirror ===
- 10. The New Look of Universality : The geography of law - Selective morality - Logics of interference
- 11. The Same and the Others : The reemergence of the Other - ...and the return of threats - The new main enemy - The Others in cast-off clothes - The Same in its various declensions - The fortunes of a term - The assignation of difference
- 12. On the Other Side of the Mirror : Revenge of the past - Memory cults - The ruses of omnipotence - Identity dictatorships - Making use of traditions - Towards new modernities? Conclusion.

== Reception ==
According to Flavia Monceri from the University of Pisa, Bessis shows how notions of the West have been used to justify imperial economic interests and the emergence of a free trade ideology. Monceri contends that what is peculiar to the West is not the mere fact of a successful hegemony, but rather the fact that ‘the nations of the West … are the only ones to have produced a theoretical (philosophical, moral and scientific) apparatus to legitimate it’. A notion of supremacy actually has underpinned the last 500 years of Western history and continues to do so – for example, in the underlying notions such as human rights and modernization. Furthermore, the West is not yet able to give up the belief in its own superiority, despite the increasing signs to the contrary that indicate it is becoming more and more a particular civilization amongst many others.

In her review for Le Monde journalist Catherine Simon asserted: "Western supremacy, however radical its criticism may be, is not, however, an anti-American rant or yet another denunciation of the West - of which Renaissance Europe was the matrix. It is a book of history that asks questions and challenges, without complacency, the elites and the societies of the South."

Maliha Chishti wrote in her review in the American Journal of Islam and Society that Bessis insists that development ideology exhorted the world to embrace the universality and inevitability of modernity and progress—but only on the condition that their development and modernization do not interfere with the West's interests. Further, Bessis predicts that although the West does not want to admit or submit to this direction, it inevitably will be pushed, either willingly or unwillingly, to finally locate itself realistically in the world.

According to Philippe Dewitte writing for Hommes & Migrations, Bessis asks if the Global South will be capable of inventing a kind of development that will no longer be a façade, a form of development that is not a copy of the West's ideology and a kind of universalism that would really be universal.

== See also ==
- Cultural hegemony
- Hellenocentrism
- Multiculturalism
- Orientalism
- White supremacy
- White nationalism
