= Tidjani =

Tidjani is a given name or surname. Notable people with the name include:

- Sidi Ahmad al-Tijani (1737–1815), founder of the Tijānī Sūfī order
- Tidjani Anaane (born 1997), Beninese footballer

== See also ==
- Tidjani Serpos
- Tijaniyyah
