= Marie-Thérèse Bocoum =

United Nations Independent Expert

- Other name: Marie-Thérèse Keïta-Bocoum'
- Citizenship: Ivorian
- Education: PhD in contemporary history, University of Aix-Marseille I
- Occupations: Human rights expert, United Nations Independent Expert
- Known for: Human rights work in Central African Republic
- Notable work: UN Independent Expert on human rights in Central African Republic (2014-)
- Spouse: Balla Keita
- Awards: National Order of Ivory Coast (2014)

Marie-Thérèse Bocoum, also known as Marie-Thérèse Keïta-Bocoum, is the United Nations Independent Expert on the situation of human rights in the Central African Republic. Educated in France and Ivory Coast, she received the National Order of the Ivory Coast in 2014.

== Education and career ==
Marie-Thérèse Bocoum studied a PhD in contemporary history at University of Aix-Marseille I in France. She then taught at the University of Abidjan in Ivory Coast. She was married to Balla Keïta, Minister of Education under the Houphouët Boigny administration in Ivory Coast, who was killed in 2002.

Bocoum travelled to Burundi in 2003 as United Nations Special Rapporteur on human rights in the country. She also worked for the United Nations in Darfur. She was appointed as United Nations Independent Expert on the situation of human rights in the Central African Republic (CAR) in 2014. She then travelled to CAR to investigate human rights abuses such as sexual violence and accusations of witchcraft. She again visited CAR in 2016 and 2017, reporting back to the UN Human Rights Council in March 2017. She called upon both the government of CAR and the international community to take action to prevent human rights abuses in the country. She reported back to the Council again in 2019 and called on all participating parties to follow the peace process. Following the signing of peace accords in Khartoum, she returned to CAR.

== Awards and recognition ==
Bocoum received the National Order of the Ivory Coast in 2014.
