= Al-Tijani =

Al-Tijani may refer to:

- Abdallah al-Tijani (fl. 1275–1311), Hafsid-era travel writer
- Ahmad al-Tijani (1735–1815), founder of the Tijaniyya
- Al-Tijani Yusuf Bashir (1912–1937), Sudanese poet
- Muhammad al-Tijani (born 1943), Tunisian scholar

== See also ==
- Tijani (disambiguation)
