= Order of Ivory Merit =

Honorary order of the Ivory Coast

Order of Ivory Merit Ordre du Mérite Ivoirien

Awarded by Ivory Coast
- Type: State Order
- Established: 11 September 1970
- Awarded for: Reward distinguished merits acquired in a public, civil, military or private function
- Classes: Grand Cross; Grand Officer; Commander; Officer; Knight

Precedence
- Next (higher): National Order of the Ivory Coast
- Next (lower): Order of Merit of National Education
- Ribbon bar of the order

The Order of Ivory Merit (Ordre du Mérite Ivoirien) is the second highest honorary order of the Ivory Coast created in 1970, and is intended to reward distinguished merits acquired in a public, civil, military or private function.

== History ==
The Order was established on 11 September 1970, replacing the Medal of National Merit. The President of the Republic is Grand Master of the Order.

== Grades ==
The order does have five levels, of which 3 grades and 2 dignities:

- Three grades:
  - Chevalier (Knight): badge worn on left breast suspended from ribbon.
  - Officier (Officer): badge worn on left breast suspended from a ribbon with a rosette.
  - Commandeur (Commander): badge around neck suspended from ribbon necklet.
- Two dignities:
  - Grand officier (Grand Officer): badge worn on left breast suspended from a ribbon, with star displayed on right breast.
  - Grand-croix (Grand Cross): the highest level; badge affixed to sash worn over the right shoulder, with star displayed on left breast.

== Insignia ==
The badge of the order is a five-pointed green star that is placed on an inverted five-pointed white star. The obverse central disc of the badge is a gold medallion that features an elephant in the middle with two palm branches on both sides. The disc is surrounded by a red enamel ring with the motto "IVOIRIAN MERIT" in French (MÉRITE IVOIRIEN). There is an elevation in the form of two golden palm leaves with white veins.

The star of the Order has long golden or silver rays and no laurel wreath. The badge is placed in the middle of the star.

The ribbon is yellow with a wide green center line and narrower side stripes.

Ribbon bars of the Order of Ivory Merit
Grand Cross	Grand Officer	Commander	Officer	Knight
