= Tijani (given name) =

Tijani and Tyjani is a masculine given name. Notable people with the name include:

- Tijani Ahmed (born 2004), Ghanaian football player
- Tijani Babangida (born 1973), Nigerian footballer
- Tijani Belaïd (born 1987), Tunisian footballer
- Tyjani Beztati (born 1997), Dutch-Moroccan kickboxer
- Tijani Ould Kerim (born 1951), Mauritanian diplomat
- Tijani Moro (born 1978), Ghanaian boxer
- Tijani Adetoyese Olusi (born 1967), Yoruba executive chairman
- Tijani Luqman Opeyemi (born 1990), Nigerian footballer
- Tijjani Noslin (born 1999), Dutch footballer
- Tijjani Reijnders (born 1998), Dutch footballer

== See also ==
- Tijjani
