= Jacqueline Fatima Bocoum =

Senegalese writer

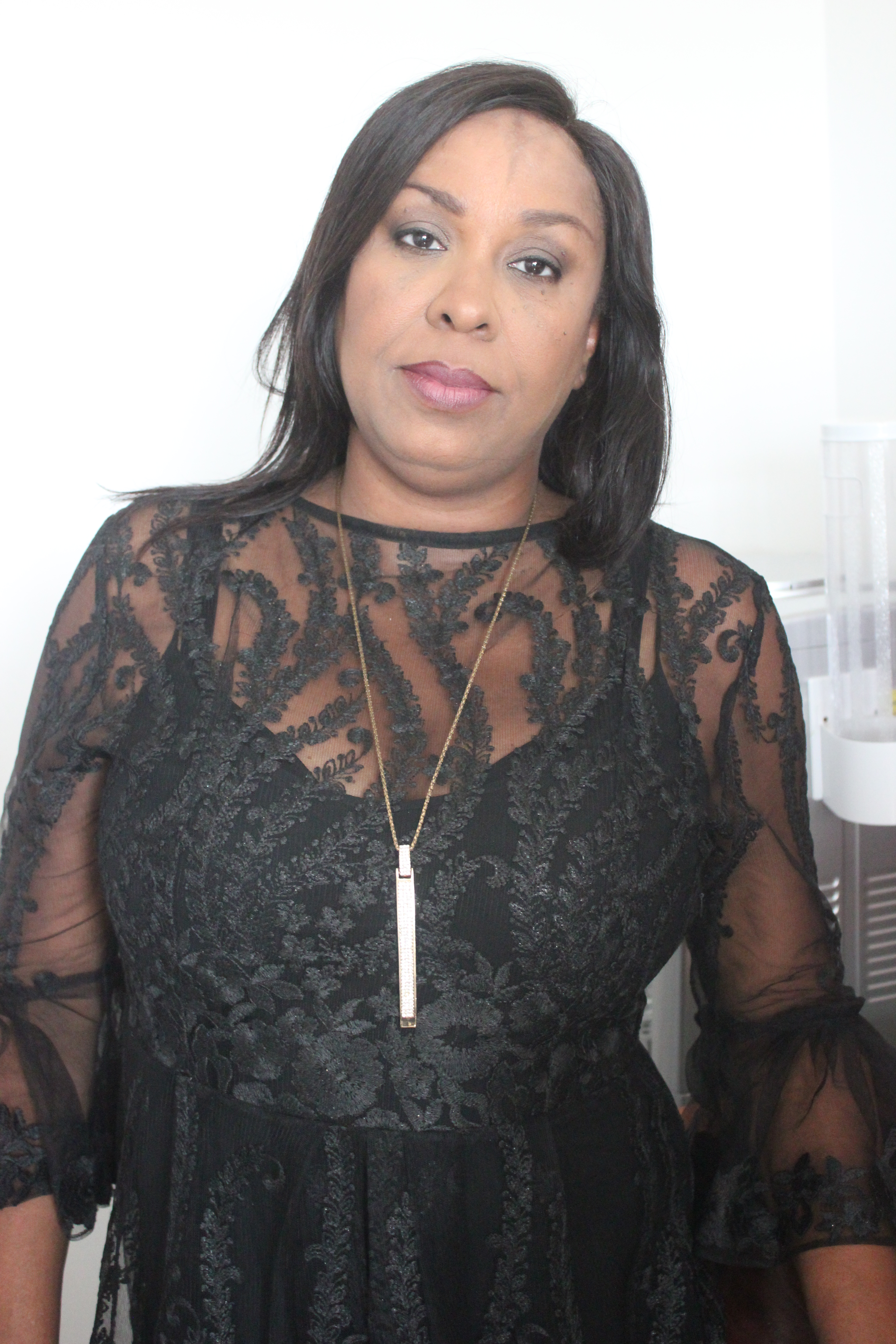
- Jacqueline Fatima Bocoum
- Citizenship: Senegal
- Occupation(s): Journalist, writer

Jacqueline Fatima Bocoum is a Senegalese journalist turned author from the West African state of Senegal. She is director of the media company Com 7.

As a journalist, she worked for R.T.S. and Sud FM before becoming Programme Director and Director of Information at Radio Nostalfie. Her father was a bureaucrat under President Léopold Sédar Senghor.

== Publications ==
- Motus et bouche ... décousue (Words and Secrets), Xamal (2002), ISBN 978-2-84402-043-7
