= Nouréini Tidjani-Serpos =

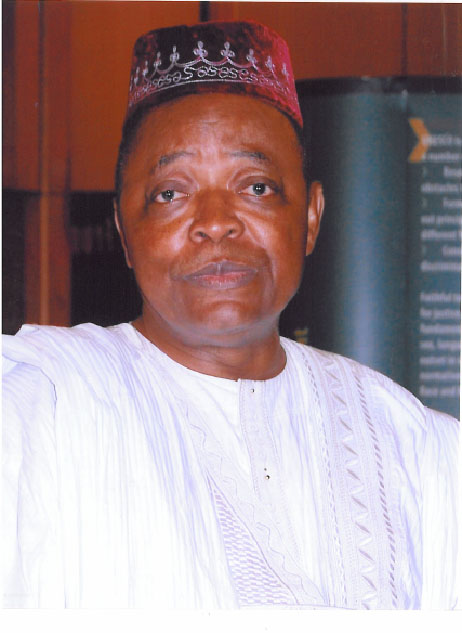
- Born: 15 January 1946 (age 80); Porto-Novo, Benin
- Education: PhD in African literature (Un.Paris VIII, 1973), Doctorate in literature, University of Lille III (1987)
- Occupations: Professor of literature, essayist, literary critic, novelist, poet
- Spouse: Rachel

Nouréini Tidjani-Serpos (born 15 January 1946 in Porto-Novo, Benin) is a distinguished scholar and writer. He studied literature in France and obtained a PhD and a D.Lit. in the subject from the University of Lille III in 1987. He has served UNESCO in various capacities, both as a representative of Benin and as a senior official of the organization.

== Career ==
From 1991 to 1998, he was the minister-counselor, deputy permanent delegate, and then ambassador and permanent delegate of Benin to UNESCO. He was a member of the executive council and the Headquarters Committee, and played a leading role in several initiatives, such as the International Conference on Cultural Policy Research, the 11th General Assembly of Member-States to the World Heritage Convention, and the committee of the World Heritage Convention. From 1995 to 1997, he was the president of the executive board and, from 1998 to 2010, he was the Assistant Director-General in the Africa Department.

As an essayist, literary critic, novelist and poet, he has published many books and articles in magazines. He was also involved in several academic journals, such as the Nigerian Journal of Humanities, the Journal of the Literary Society of Nigeria, and Présence Africaine. He has been a teacher of Comparative African Literature since 1972, at the University of Paris VIII, the National University of Benin, and the Federal University of Benin City in Nigeria. He has also held various management positions at the university level, such as the chair of the Modern Humanities department, a member of the Administrative Council of the University for Social, Cultural, and Environmental Research, the Chairman of the board of the Council of Administration for the University of Benin City’s secondary pilot school, and the national president of the Association of Modern Literature of Nigeria.

== Publications ==
- Maïté (poésie).Cotonou:Imprimerie ABM,1967
- Agba'Nla (poésie).Paris:P.J.Oswald,1973
- Le nouveau souffle (poésie).Benin-City: Ambik Press,1986.
- Aspects de la critique africaine (critique littéraire). Paris; Lomé:Editions Silex;Editions Haho,1987.
- Porto-Novo, un rêve brésilien (poésie )en collaboration avec Jean Caffé.Paris:Ed.Kathala, Ed.ASSOCLE,1993.
- Aspects de la critique africaine (Tome2): l'intellectuel africain face au roman,(critique littéraire).Paris: Editions Silex; Editions Nouvelles du Sud,1996.
- Bamikilé (roman).Paris:Présence Africaine,1996.

== Honorary distinctions ==
- 1992: Knight of the Order des Arts et Culture (France)
- 1992: Commander of the Palmes académiques (France)
- 1996: Officer of the National Order of Merit (Benin)
- 2000: Officer of the National Order of Mono (Togo)
- 2004: Officer of the National Order of the Ivory Coast
- 2005: Commander of the National Order of Benin
- 2008: Officer of the National Order of Niger
