= Italians =

Ethnic group native to Italy

Italiani (Italian)

Total population
- c. 140 million: Italy: 55,551,000; Italian diaspora and ancestry: c. 80 million

Regions with significant populations
- Italy 55,551,000
- Brazil: 32–34 million (incl. ancestry)
- Argentina: 25 million (incl. ancestry)
- United States: 16–23 million (incl. ancestry)
- France: 5–6 million (incl. ancestry)
- Paraguay: 2–2.5 million (incl. ancestry)
- Colombia: 2 million (incl. ancestry)
- Peru: 2 million (incl. ancestry)
- Venezuela: 1.5–2 million (incl. ancestry)
- Uruguay: 1.54 million (incl. ancestry); 44% of Uruguay's population
- Canada: 1.5 million (incl. ancestry)
- Germany: c. 1.2 million
- Australia: 1.1 million (incl. ancestry)
- Switzerland: 637,417
- Chile: 600,000
- United Kingdom: 481,382
- Belgium: 451,825
- Costa Rica: 381,316
- Spain: 350,981
- Mexico: 85,000
- South Africa: 77,400
- Ecuador: 56,000
- Netherlands: 58,506
- Austria: 43,002
- Portugal: 36,227
- San Marino: 33,400
- Luxembourg: 32,810
- Ireland: 25,000
- Croatia: 19,636
- Albania: 19,000
- Israel: 18,015
- Bolivia: 15,000
- Denmark: 13,302
- Greece: 13,000
- United Arab Emirates: 12,231
- Poland: 10,000
- Thailand: 10,000
- Turkey: 2,283
- Algeria: 1,000

Languages
- Italian and other languages of Italy

Religion
- Predominantly Roman Catholic Church; Minority Irreligion

Related ethnic groups
- Corsicans, Sammarinese, Maltese people Swiss Italians

Italians (Italian: italiani, pronounced [itaˈljaːni]) are an ethnic group and nation native to the Italian geographical region. Italians share a common culture, history, ancestry and language. Their ancestors, differing regionally, include the various Italic peoples, notably among them the ancient Romans, who helped create and evolve the Italian identity. The Latin equivalent of the term Italian had been in use for natives of the geographical region since antiquity. Ethnic Italians (a group which includes people of Italian descent without Italian citizenship) can be distinguished from Italian nationals, who are citizens of Italy regardless of ancestry or nation of residence.

The majority of Italian nationals are native speakers of the country's official language, Standard Italian, a Romance language of the Indo-European language family that evolved from the Vulgar Latin. However, many of them also speak a regional or minority language native to Italy, the existence of which predates the national language of Standard Italian. (According to UNESCO, there are approximately 30 languages native to Italy, although many are often incorrectly referred to as "Italian dialects".)

In addition to the approximately 55 million Italians living in Italy (91% of the Italian national population), Italian-speaking groups are found in neighboring nations, including Switzerland, France, the regions of Istria and Dalmatia, and the entire population of San Marino. Due to the wide-ranging diaspora of Italians following Italian unification, World War I, and World War II, over 5 million Italian citizens live outside of Italy and over 80 million people around the world claim full or partial Italian ancestry. The largest Italian diaspora communities are found in Brazil (15% of Brazilians), Argentina (60% of Argentinians), the United States, and Canada.

Italians have influenced and contributed to fields like arts and music, science, technology, fashion, cinema, cuisine, restaurants, sports, jurisprudence, banking and business. Furthermore, Italian people are generally known for their attachment to their locale, expressed in the form of either regionalism or municipalism.

== Name ==
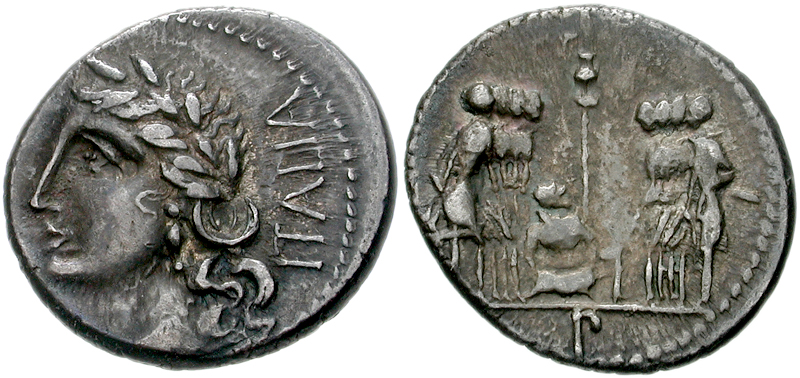
Silver coin minted in Corfinium during the Social War (91–87 BC), displaying the inscription ITALIA on the verge of the personification of Italy, represented as a goddess with laurel wreath

The Latin name "Italia" may have been borrowed via Greek from the Oscan Víteliú ("land of calves"). Accounts by Dionysius of Halicarnassus, Aristotle, and Thucydides reference this etymology, together with the legend that Italy was named after legendary King Italus. According to Antiochus of Syracuse, the Greeks initially used the term Italy to refer only to the southern portion of the Bruttium peninsula (corresponding to parts of the modern provinces of Reggio, Catanzaro, and Vibo Valentia); however, over time, the Greeks gradually came to apply the name "Italia" to a larger region including Lucania and Calabria.

Roman historian Cato the Elder described Italy as the entire peninsula south of the Alps, which he said formed the "walls of Italy". In the 260s BCE, Roman Italy extended from the Arno and Rubicon rivers to the entire south. The northern area of Cisalpine Gaul was occupied by Rome in the 220s BC and became considered geographically and de facto part of Italy, but remained politically and de jure separated until Octavian legally merged it into the administrative unit of Italy in 42 BCE. Under Emperor Diocletian, Italy was further enlarged to include the three big islands of the western Mediterranean Sea: Sicily (with the Maltese archipelago), Sardinia, and Corsica. All its inhabitants were considered Italic and Roman.

The Latin term Italicus was used to describe "a man of Italy" as opposed to a provincial from the greater Roman provinces. The Greeks likewise used terms such as Ἰταλικοί (Italikoi) and Ἰταλιώτης (Italiotes) to refer to the peoples and inhabitants of Italy. The adjective Italianus emerged in the medieval period and was used as an alternative alongside Italicus into the early modern period.

The Kingdom of Italy was created after the fall of the Western Roman Empire. The name "Italia" was retained for the kingdom under the Lombards and later their successor kingdom within the Holy Roman Empire.

== History ==
=== Roman era ===
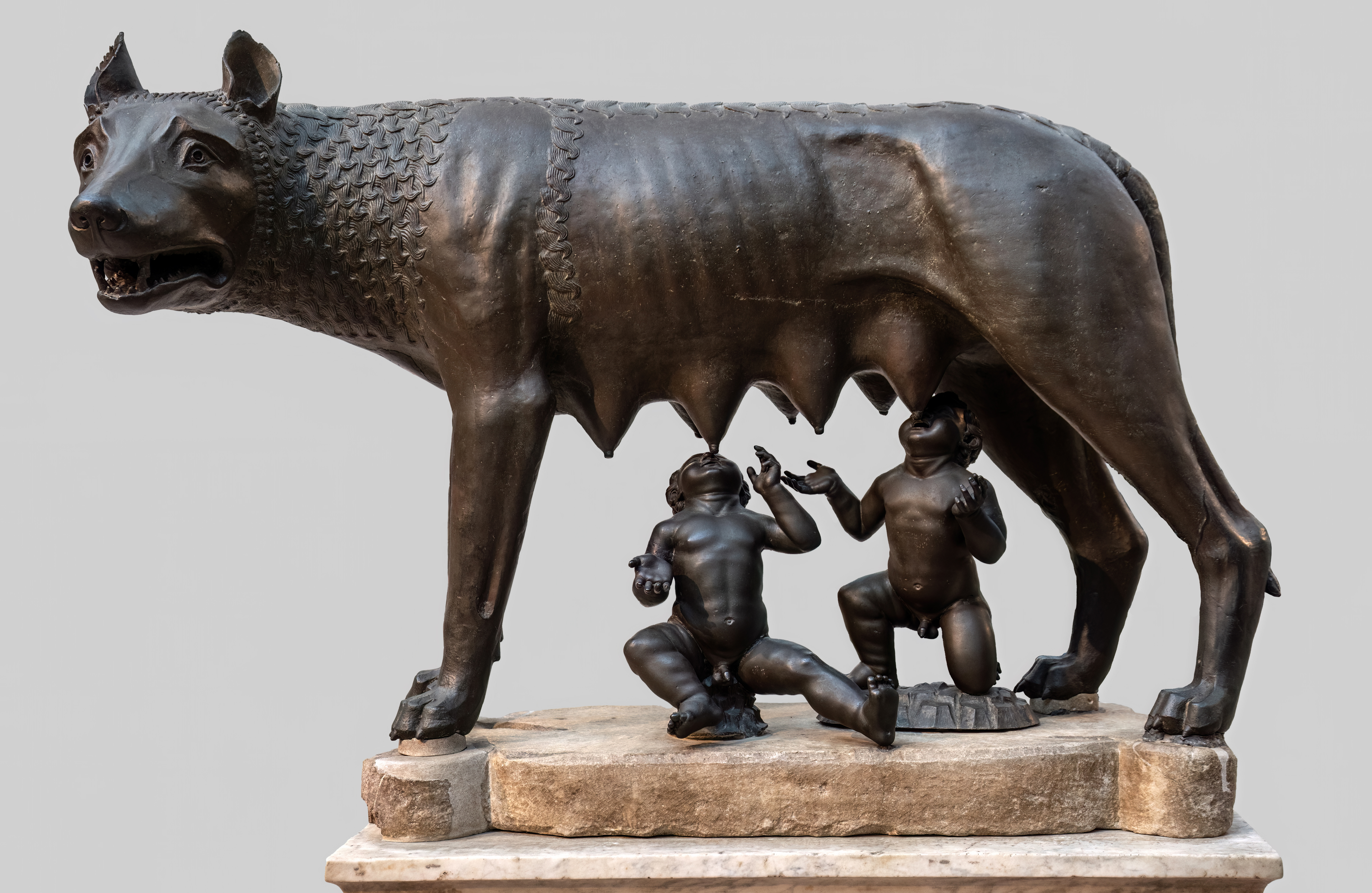
The Capitoline Wolf (Italian: Lupa Capitolina) is a bronze sculpture depicting a scene from the legend of the founding of Rome. The sculpture shows a she-wolf suckling the mythical twin founders of Rome, Romulus and Remus. The image of the she-wolf suckling Romulus and Remus is a symbol of Rome since ancient times, and one of the most recognizable icons of ancient mythology.

The Italian Peninsula was divided into multiple tribal or ethnic territories prior to the Roman conquest of Italy in the 3rd century BCE. The Latins, with Rome as their capital, came to dominate the Italian Peninsula by 218 BCE. They continued to expand beyond Italy, and after a century-long struggle against Carthage, Rome conquered Sicily, Sardinia, and Corsica. By the end of the Third Punic War in 146 BCE, Rome had completely destroyed Carthage and become the dominant power in the Mediterranean. Unification and Romanization of Italy culminated in 88 BC, when, in the aftermath of the Social War, Rome granted Roman citizenship to all fellow Italic peoples.

Rome was originally a republican city-state, but four famous civil conflicts destroyed the Roman Republic: Sulla against Marius (88–82 BCE), Julius Caesar against Pompey (49–45 BC), Brutus and Cassius against Mark Antony and Octavian (43 BC), and Mark Antony against Octavian. Octavian, the final victor (31 BC), became the first Roman Emperor.

During the Crisis of the Third Century, the Roman Empire nearly collapsed under the combined pressures of invasions, civil wars, and hyperinflation. In 284 CE, Emperor Diocletian restored political stability. He divided the Roman Empire's territory and administration into the Western and Eastern Empires. Christianity became the Roman state religion in AD 380, under Emperor Theodosius I. The defeat of the last Western Roman emperor, Romulus Augustulus, by Germanic general Odoacer marked the end of the Western Roman Empire (and political unification of Italy until the establishment of the modern Kingdom of Italy in 1861).

=== The Middle Ages ===
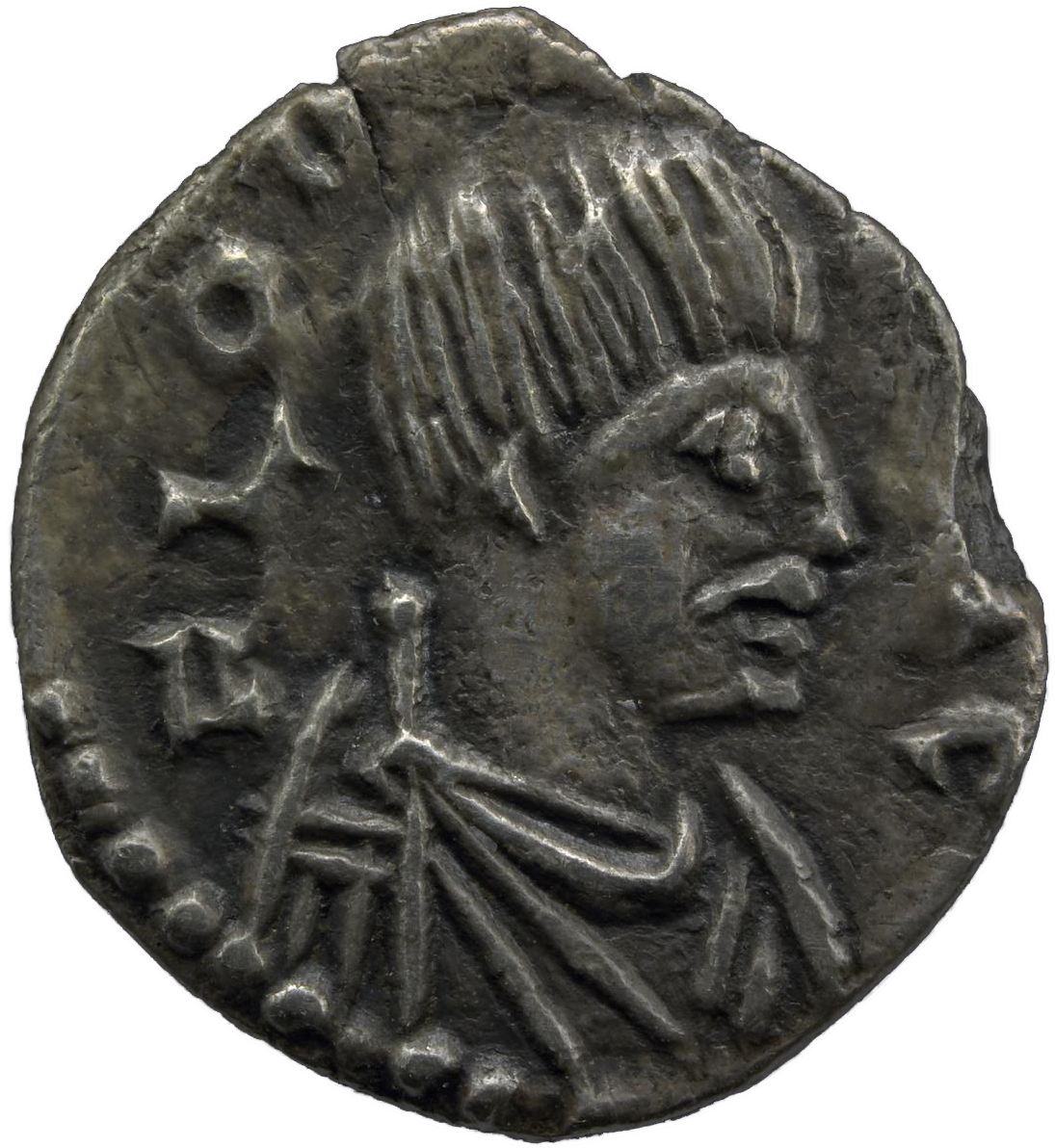
Odoacer, the first King of Italy

Odoacer ruled as the first king of Italy. After the death of his successor Theodoric in 526 CE, the kingdom began to grow weak. By 553 CE, Byzantine Emperor Justinian I expelled the Ostrogoths from Italy and brought it back under Roman control. However, within twenty years, the Lombards invaded Italy and conquered most of the peninsula. (Remnants of Byzantine control remained in Southern Italy until the Arab conquest of Sicily in the 9th century and the Norman conquest of Southern Italy in the 11th; the interaction among Latin, Byzantine, Arab, and Norman cultures resulted in the formation of a unique Norman-Arab-Byzantine culture in Southern Italy.)

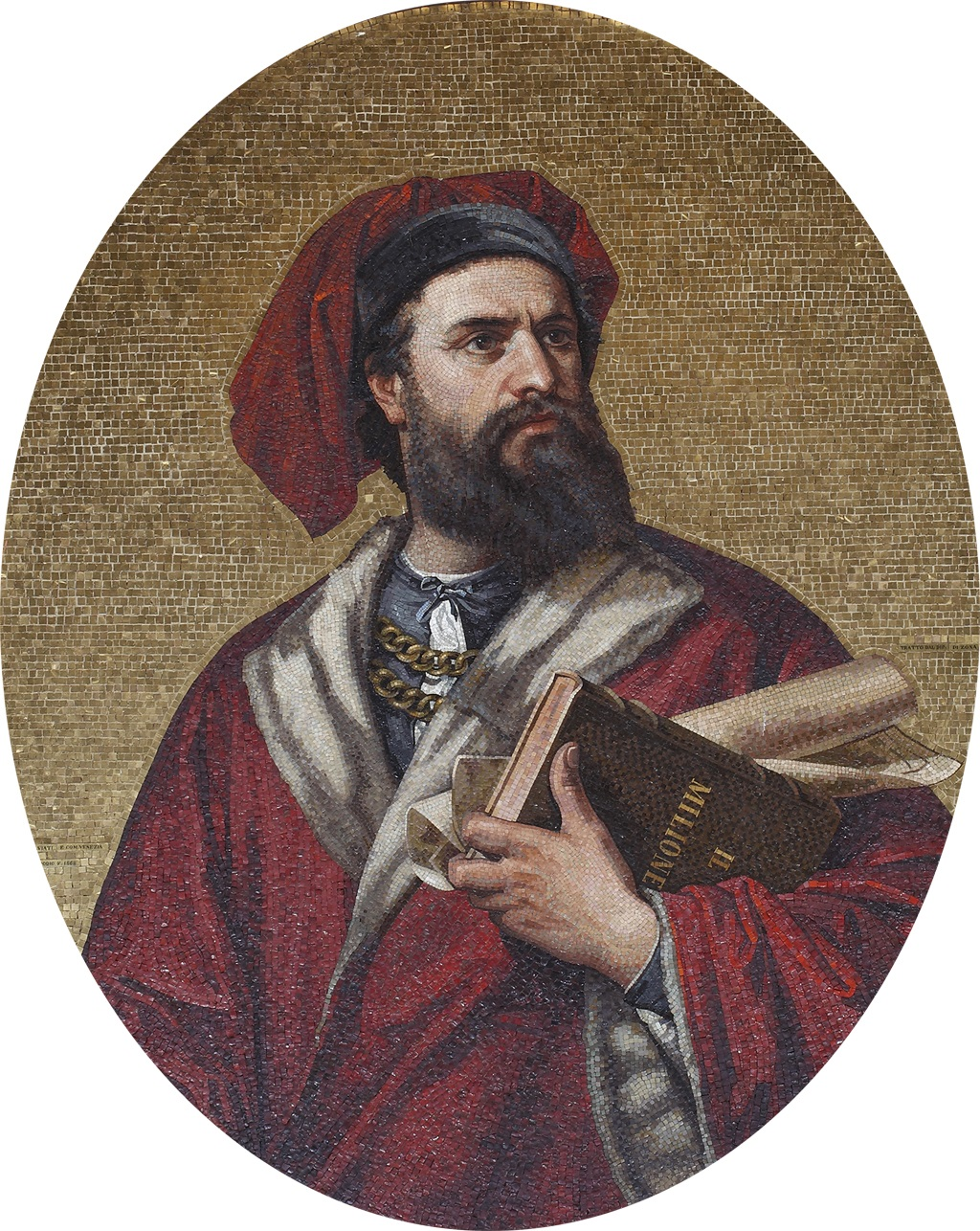
Marco Polo, explorer of the 13th century, recorded his 24 years-long travels in the Book of the Marvels of the World, introducing Europeans to Central Asia and China.

For two centuries following the Lombard invasion, the popes opposed foreign rule in Italy. They ultimately defeated the Lombards, with the aid of two Frankish kings, Pepin and Charlemagne, and established the Papal States in central Italy in 756. To cement the Church's alliance with Charlemagne, Pope Leo III crowned him the Roman Emperor in 800. Members of the Carolingian dynasty continued to rule Italy, and this Kingdom of Italy became part of the Holy Roman Empire in the 10th century.

=== The Renaissance and the Age of Discovery ===
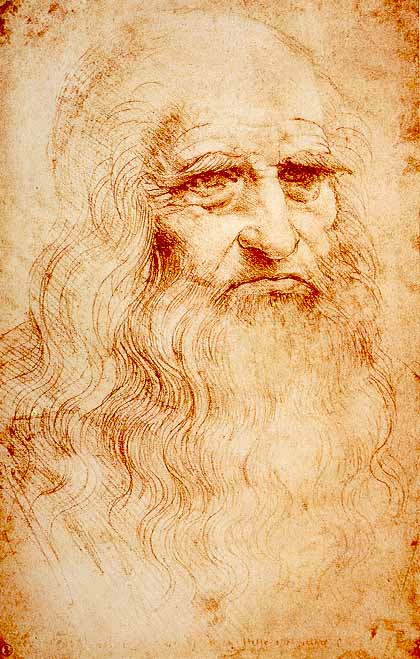
Leonardo da Vinci, a polymath of the High Renaissance who was active as a painter, draughtsman, engineer, scientist, theorist, sculptor, and architect

From the 11th century on, Italian cities rapidly grew in independence and importance, becoming centers of political life, banking, and foreign trade. Many, including Florence, Rome, Genoa, Milan, Pisa, Siena and Venice, grew into nearly independent city-states and maritime republics, each with its own foreign policy and trade. By the 14th and 15th centuries, some Italian city-states, such as Venice and Florence, ranked among the most influential powers in Europe. The Italian merchant cities acted as a gateway for goods and ideas from the Byzantine and Islamic world into Europe; the Renaissance began in Florence in the 14th century and led to an unparalleled flourishing of the arts, literature, music, and science.

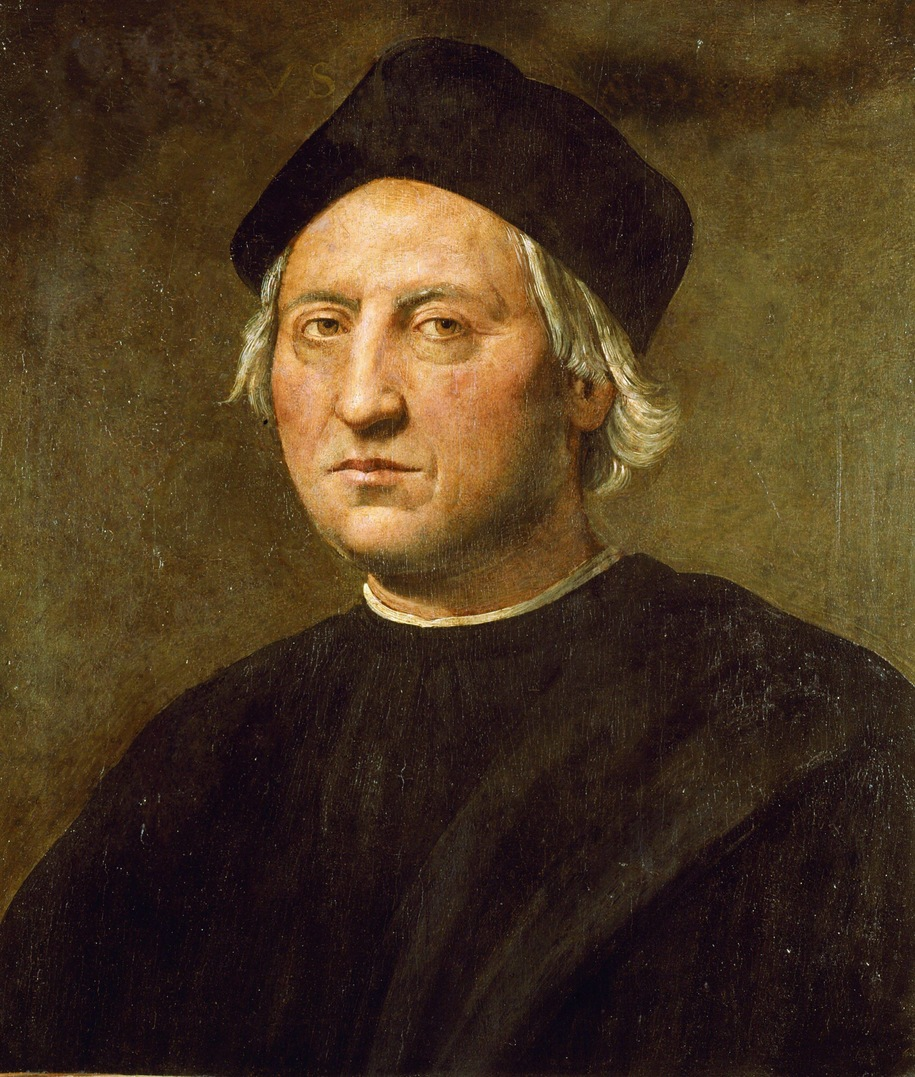
The Italian explorer Christopher Columbus leads an expedition to the New World, 1492. His voyages are celebrated as the discovery of the Americas from a European perspective, and they opened a new era in the history of humankind and sustained contact between the two worlds.

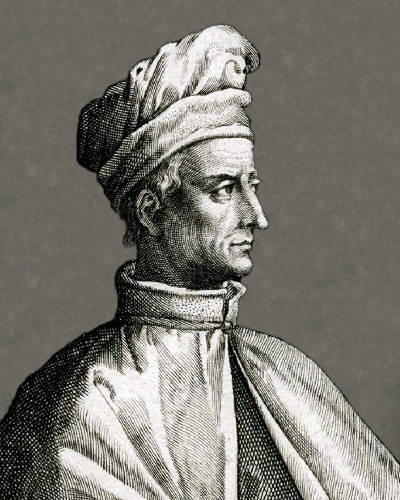
Amerigo Vespucci, Italian explorer from whose name the term "America" is derived

Italian explorers and navigators, eager to find alternative trade routes to the Indies, ushered in the Age of Discovery and the European colonization of the Americas. Notable among them were: Christopher Columbus (Cristoforo Colombo), who discovered the New World and opened the Americas for European conquest; John Cabot (Giovanni Caboto), the first European to arrive in Newfoundland; Amerigo Vespucci (for whom the Americas were named), who demonstrated circa 1501 that the New World was not Asia but a previously unknown continent; and Giovanni da Verrazzano, the first European to explore the Atlantic coast of North America.

=== The French Revolution and Napoleon ===
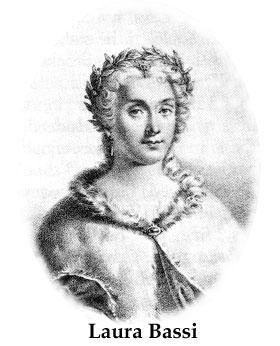
Laura Bassi, the first chairwoman of a university in a scientific field of studies

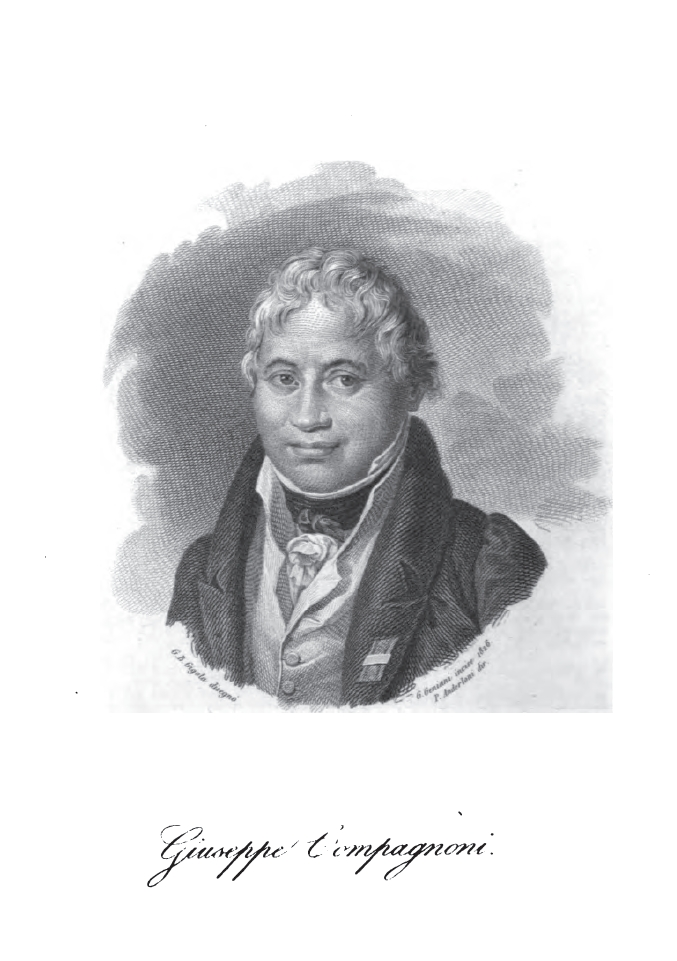
Giuseppe Compagnoni, considered the "father of the flag of Italy"

The French Revolution began in 1789 and immediately found supporters among the Italian people. After the French king was overthrown and France became a republic, secret clubs favouring an Italian republic were formed throughout Italy. In 1796, Napoleon Bonaparte led a French army into northern Italy and drove out its Austrian rulers. Napoleon made himself emperor in 1804; parts of northern and central Italy were unified under the name of the Kingdom of Italy, with Napoleon as king, the rest was annexed by France. French domination, which lasted less than 20 years, brought representative assemblies and new laws that were uniform across the country; for the first time since ancient Rome, Italians from different regions were using the same money and served in the same army. Many Italians began to see the possibility of a united Italy free of foreign control.

=== Italian unification and the Kingdom of Italy ===
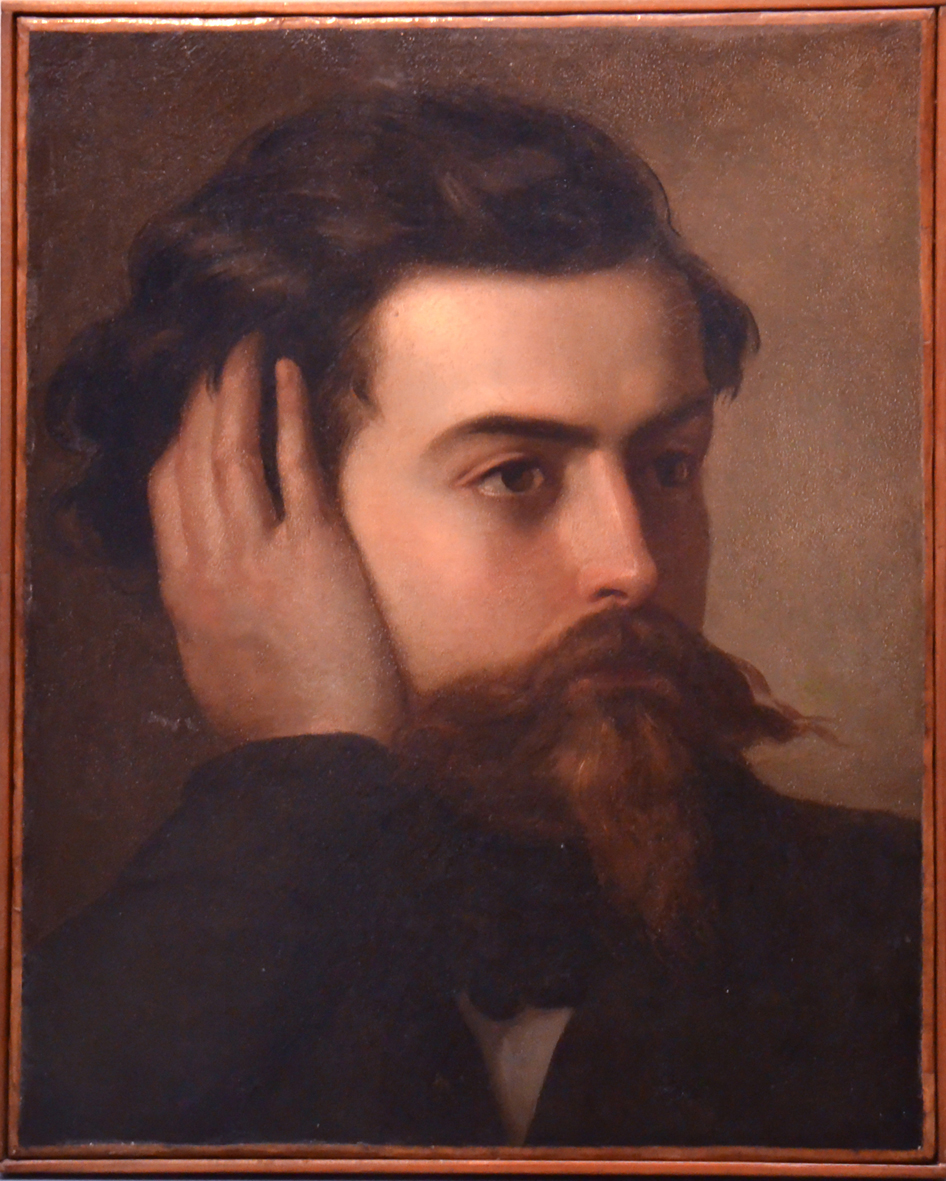
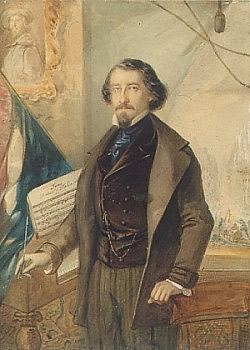
On the left, Goffredo Mameli, author of the lyrics; on the right, Michele Novaro, composer of the music, of the song Il Canto degli Italiani, the Italian national anthem since 1946

In the aftermath of Napoleon's defeat and the Congress of Vienna, Italy came under control of the Austrian Empire and the Habsburg dynasty. Italian nationalist movements, led by reformers such as Giuseppe Mazzini, occurred in several parts of the peninsula from the 1830s to 1849. The Risorgimento revolution of the 1850s was ultimately successful, and on 17 March 1861, Victor Emmanuel II was proclaimed king of the Kingdom of Italy.

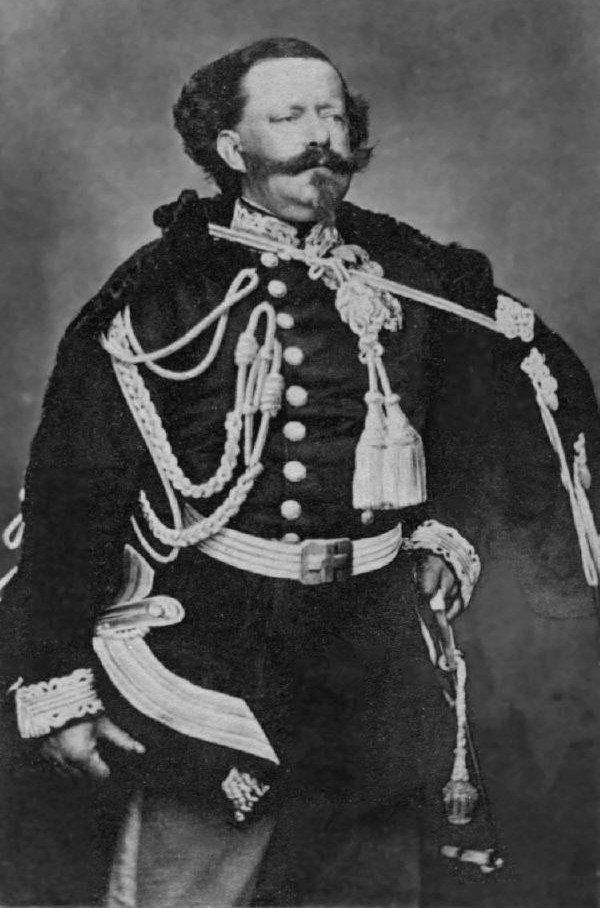
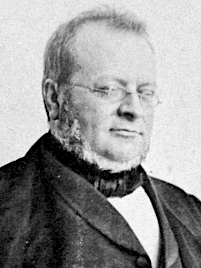
Victor Emmanuel II (left) and Camillo Benso, Count of Cavour (right), leading figures in the Italian unification, became respectively the first king and first Prime Minister of unified Italy.

Italian troops occupied Rome in 1870, and in July 1871, it formally became the capital of the kingdom. Pope Pius IX, a longtime rival of Italian kings, stated he had been made a "prisoner" inside the Vatican walls and refused to cooperate with the royal administration. Only in 1929 did the pope accept the unified Italy with Rome as its capital.

The process of Italian unification was completed in World War I, with the annexation of Trieste, Istria, Trentino-Alto Adige, and Zara. After World War I, Italy emerged as one of the world's four great powers. In the decades following unification, Italy began creating colonies in Africa, and under Benito Mussolini's Fascist regime conquered Ethiopia, founding the Italian Empire in 1936. The population of Italy grew to 45 million in 1940 and the economy, which had been based upon agriculture until that time, started its industrial development, mainly in northern Italy.

=== The Italian Republic ===
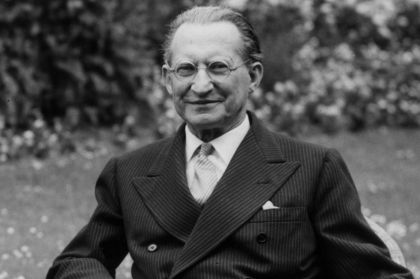
Alcide De Gasperi, first republican Prime Minister of Italy and one of the Founding Fathers of the European Union

On 2 June 1946, Italy held its first free election after more than 20 years of Fascist rule. Italians chose to replace the monarchy, which had been closely associated with Fascism, with a republic. They elected a Constituent Assembly of anti-fascist representatives, which created a new democratic Italian constitution in 1947.

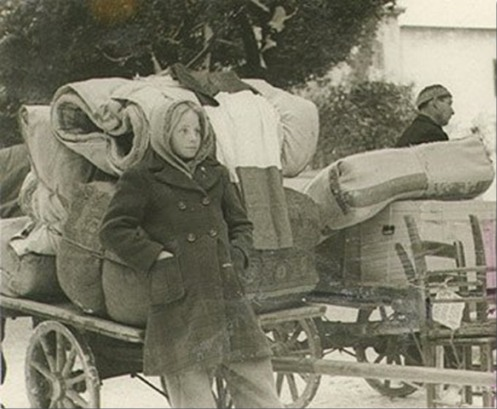
A young Italian exile on the run carries, along with her personal effects, a flag of Italy, during the Istrian-Dalmatian exodus.

Under the Treaty of Peace with Italy, Yugoslavia annexed Istria, Kvarner, most of the Julian March, and Zara, which led to the emigration of between 230,000 and 350,000 ethnic Italians, Slovenians, Croatians, and Istro-Romanians, who chose to maintain Italian citizenship.

In 1949 Italy became a member of NATO. The Marshall Plan helped to revive the Italian economy which, until the late 1960s, enjoyed a period of sustained economic growth commonly called the "Economic Miracle". In 1957, Italy was a founding member of the European Economic Community (EEC), which became the European Union (EU) in 1993.

== Ethnogenesis ==
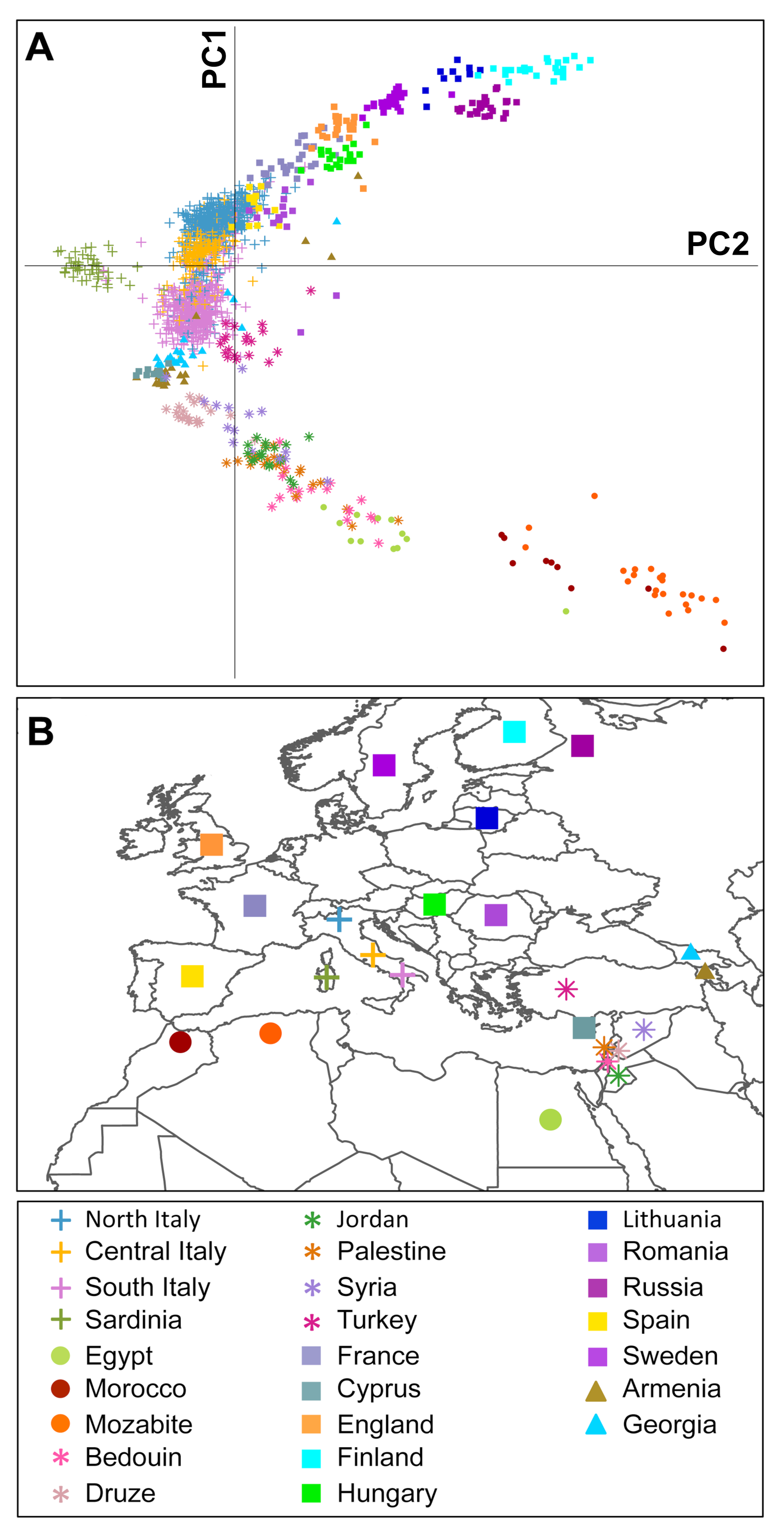
Principal component analysis of the Italian population with other populations

Due to historic demographic shifts in the Italian peninsula throughout history, its geographical position in the center of the Mediterranean Sea, and Italy's regional ethnic diversity since ancient times, modern Italians are genetically diverse.

=== Bronze Age ===
Italians, like most Europeans, largely descend from three distinct lineages: Paleolithic hunter-gatherers, such as the Epigravettian culture, who arrived in the Italian peninsula as early as 35,000 to 40,000 years ago; Neolithic Early European Farmers who migrated from Western Asia and the Middle East during the Neolithic Revolution 9,000 years ago; and Yamnaya Steppe pastoralists who expanded into Europe from the Pontic–Caspian steppe of Ukraine and southern Russia during the Indo-European migrations 5,000 years ago.

The first wave of Indo-European migrations into Italy in the Bronze Age occurred from Central Europe (e.g. the Bell Beaker culture), followed by the Italo-Celts (e.g. the Celtic-speaking Canegrate culture and the Italic-speaking Proto-Villanovan culture, both deriving from the Proto-Italo-Celtic Urnfield culture). Recent DNA studies confirmed the arrival of Steppe-related ancestry in Northern Italy to at least 2000 BCE and in Central Italy by 1600 BCE, with this ancestry component increasing through time. In the late Bronze Age and early Iron Age, Celtic-speaking La Tène and Hallstatt cultures spread over a large part of Italy, with related archeological artifacts found as far south as Apulia. Italics occupied northeastern, southern, and central Italy. The "West Italic" group (including the Latins) were the first wave. Major tribes included the Latins and Falisci in Lazio; the Oenotrians and Italii in Calabria; the Ausones, Aurunci and Opici in Campania; and perhaps the Veneti in Veneto and the Sicels in Sicily. They were followed, and largely displaced by the East Italic (Osco-Umbrians) group.

=== Iron Age ===
Ethnolinguistic map of Italy in the Iron Age, before the Roman expansion in Italy

During the Iron Age, prior to Roman rule, Italy was predominantly inhabited by Italic tribes. The peoples living in the area of modern Italy and the islands were:

- Etruscans (Camunni, Lepontii, Raeti);
- Sicani in Sicily
- Elymians;
- Ligures (Apuani, Bagienni, Briniates, Corsi, Friniates, Garuli, Hercates, Ilvates, Insubres, Orobii, Laevi, Lapicini, Marici, Statielli, Taurini);
- Italics (Latins, Falisci, Marsi, Umbri, Volsci, Marrucini, Osci, Aurunci, Ausones, Campanians, Paeligni, Sabines, Bruttii, Frentani, Lucani, Samnites, Pentri, Caraceni, Caudini, Hirpini, Aequi, Fidenates, Hernici, Picentes, Vestini, Morgeti, Sicels, Veneti);
- Iapygians (Messapians, Daunians, Peucetians);
- Celts (Allobroges, Ausones, Boii, Carni, Cenomani, Ceutrones, Graioceli, Lepontii, Lingones, Segusini, Senones, Salassi, Veragri, Vertamocorii);
- Greeks of Magna Graecia;
- Sardinians (Nuragic tribes), in Sardinia

By the beginning of the Iron Age, the Etruscans had emerged as the dominant civilization on the Italian peninsula. The Etruscans, expanded from Etruria over a large part of Italy, covering what is now Tuscany, western Umbria, and northern Lazio, as well as what are now the Po Valley, Emilia-Romagna, south-eastern Lombardy, southern Veneto, and western Campania. Ancient authors report several hypotheses for the origin of the Etruscans, including that they came from the Aegean Sea. Modern archaeological and genetic research concluded that the Etruscans were autochthonous and had a genetic profile similar to their Latin neighbors, notably lacking recent admixture with Anatolia or the Eastern Mediterranean.

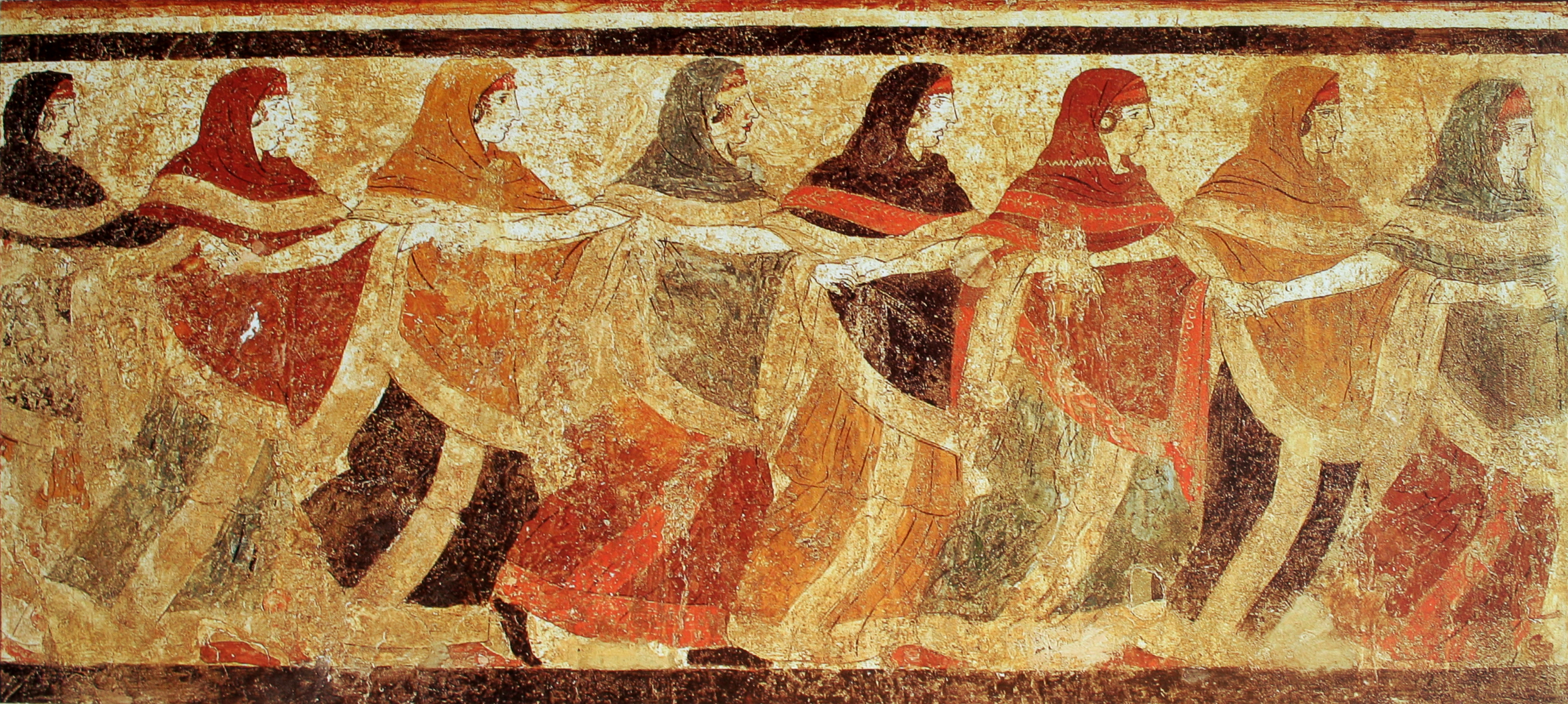
Fresco of dancing Peucetian women in the Tomb of the Dancers in Ruvo di Puglia, 4th–5th century BC

The Ligures were one of the oldest populations in Italy and Western Europe, possibly of Pre-Indo-European origin. According to Strabo, they were not Celts but later became influenced by the Celtic culture of their neighbours, and thus are sometimes referred to as Celticized Ligurians or Celto-Ligurians. Their language had similarities to both Italic (Latin and the Osco-Umbrian languages) and Celtic (Gaulish). They primarily inhabited the regions of Liguria, Piedmont, northern Tuscany, western Lombardy, western Emilia-Romagna and northern Sardinia, but are believed to have once occupied an even larger portion of ancient Italy as far south as Sicily. They were also settled in Corsica and in the Provence region along the southern coast of modern France.

Beginning in the 8th century BCE, Greeks arrived in Italy and founded cities along the coast of southern Italy and eastern Sicily, which became known as Magna Graecia ("Greater Greece"). The Greeks were frequently at war with the native Italic tribes, but nonetheless managed to Hellenize and assimilate much of the indigenous population located along eastern Sicily and the Southern coasts of the Italian mainland. According to Beloch, the number of Greek citizens in southern Italy reached only 80,000 to 90,000 at most, while the local people subjected by the Greeks were between 400,000 and 600,000. By the 4th and 3rd centuries BCE, Greek power in Italy was challenged and began to decline, and many Greeks were pushed out of peninsular Italy by the native Oscan, Brutti, and Lucani tribes.

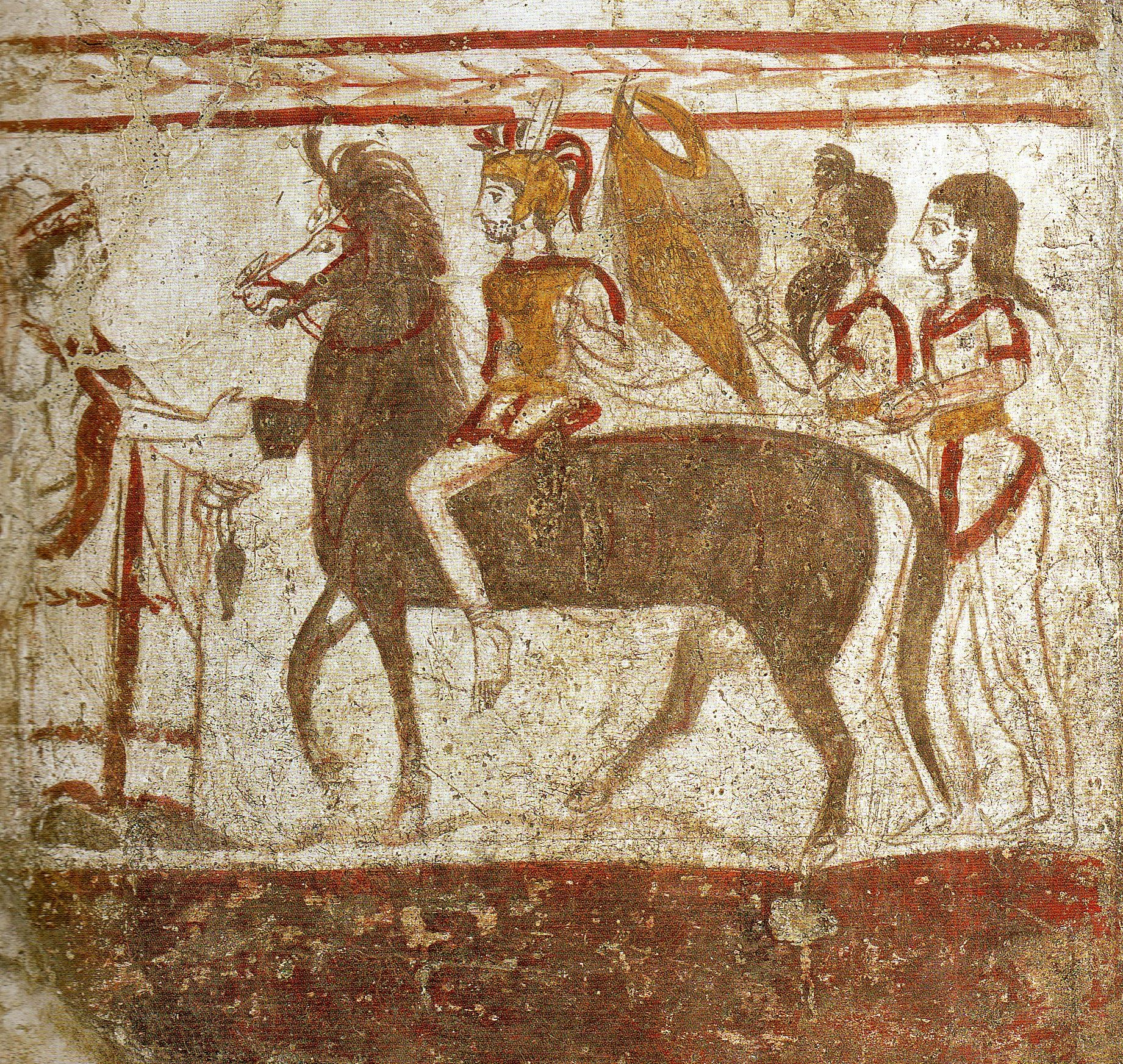
A mounted Lucanian warrior, fresco from a tomb of Paestum, Italy, c. 360 BC

The Gauls crossed the Alps and invaded northern Italy in the 4th and 3rd centuries BC, settling in the area that became known as Cisalpine Gaul. Although named after the Gauls, the region was mostly inhabited by indigenous tribes, namely the Ligures, Etruscans, Euganei, and Veneti. Estimates by Beloch and Brunt suggest that in the 3rd century BCE, Gaulish settlers in north Italy numbered between 130,000 and 140,000 out of a total population of about 1.4 million. The northern half of Cisalpine Gaul was already inhabited by the Celtic Lepontii since the Bronze Age. Speaking about the Alpine region, the Greek historian Strabo, wrote:

The Alps are inhabited by numerous nations, but all Keltic with the exception of the Ligurians, and these, though of a different race, closely resemble them in their manner of life.

According to Pliny and Livy, after the invasion of the Gauls, some of the Etruscans living in the Po Valley sought refuge in the Alps and became known as the Raeti. The Raeti inhabited the region of Trentino-Alto Adige, as well as eastern Switzerland and Tyrol in western Austria. The Ladins of north-eastern Italy and the Romansh people of Switzerland are said to be descended from the Raeti.

=== Roman ===
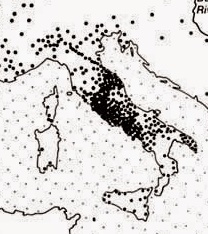
Map of Roman coloniae during the second century in Italy

The Romans — who according to legend originally consisted of three ancient tribes: Latins, Sabines and Etruscans — would go on to conquer the whole Italian peninsula. During the Roman period hundreds of cities and colonies were established throughout Italy, including Florence, Turin, Como, Pavia, Padua, Verona, Vicenza, Trieste and many others. After the Roman conquest of Italy, "the whole of Italy had become Latinized". The Romans continued expansion northward to conquer Cisalpine Gaul and establish colonies in the former Gallic territory, including Bologna, Modena, Reggio Emilia, Parma, Piacenza, Cremona and Forlì. According to Strabo:

The Cispadane peoples occupy all that country which is encircled by the Apennine Mountains towards the Alps as far as Genua and Sabata. The greater part of the country used to be occupied by the Boii, Ligures, Senones, and Gaesatae; but since the Boii have been driven out, and since both the Gaesatae and the Senones have been annihilated, only the Ligurian tribes and the Roman colonies are left.

The Boii, the most powerful and numerous of the Gallic tribes, were expelled by the Romans after 191 BCE and settled in Bohemia, while the Insubres still lived in Mediolanum in the 1st century BCE.

Latin colonies were founded at Ariminum in 268 BCE and at Firmum in 264 BCE, while large numbers of Picentes, who previously inhabited the region, were moved to Paestum and settled along the river Silarus in Campania. Between 180 and 179 BCE, 47,000 Ligures belonging to the Apuani tribe were removed from their home along the modern Ligurian-Tuscan border and deported to Samnium, an area corresponding to inland Campania, while Latin colonies were established in their place at Pisa, Lucca and Luni. Such population movements contributed to the rapid Romanization and Latinization of Italy.

During the Principate, genetic evidence indicates substantial migration from the western Anatolian and Aegean regions into the city of Rome and surrounding areas of central Italy. Individuals from these areas exhibit an increased proportion of Neolithic Caucasus/Iranian-related ancestries compared with Bronze Age samples, consistent with an influx of populations carrying substantial Eastern Mediterranean ancestry. A similarly pronounced demographic shift toward Eastern Mediterranean-related ancestry is evident in the Iberian and Balkan Peninsulas during the same period. These patterns suggest extensive long-distance mobility across the Roman Empire, plausibly originating from major eastern urban centres such as Ephesus, Pergamon, Smyrna, Corinth, Athens, Byzantium, and Antioch.

=== Middle Ages ===
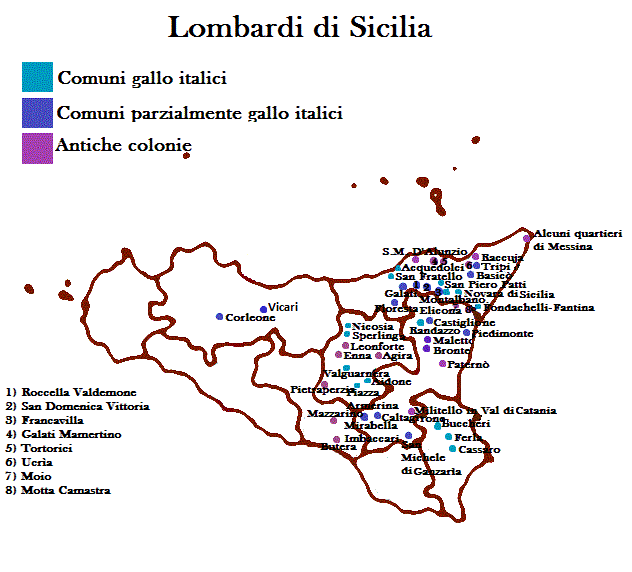
Lombard (Northern Italian) colonies of Sicily: in light blue: the cities where Gallo-Italic language is spoken today. In dark blue: the cities where there is a good influence of the Gallo-Italic language. In purple: ancient Gallo-Italic colonies, the influence in these cities is variable, also some districts of Messina were colonized.

A large Germanic confederation of Sciri, Heruli, Turcilingi, and Rugians, led by Odoacer, invaded and settled Italy in 476 CE. They were preceded by the Alemanni, including 30,000 warriors with their families, who settled in the Po Valley in 371 CE, and by Burgundians who settled between Northwestern Italy and Southern France in 443 CE. The Germanic tribe of the Ostrogoths led by Theodoric the Great conquered Italy and, in order to legitimize their rule to Roman subjects who believed in the superiority of Roman culture over foreign "barbarian" culture, created a blended Romano-Germanic culture. Since Italy had a population of several million, the Goths did not constitute a significant addition to the local population: at most, several thousand Ostrogoths in a population of 6 or 7 million. After the Gothic War, which devastated the local population, the Ostrogoths were defeated. Nevertheless, according to Roman historian Procopius of Caesarea, the Ostrogothic population was allowed to live peacefully in Italy with their Rugian allies under Roman sovereignty.

In the sixth century, another Germanic tribe known as the Longobards invaded Italy, which in the meantime had been reconquered by the East Roman or Byzantine Empire. The Longobards were a small minority compared to the roughly 4 million inhabitants of Italy at the time. They were later followed by the Bavarians and the Franks, who conquered and ruled most of Italy. Some groups of Slavs settled in parts of the northern Italian Peninsula between the 7th and 8th centuries, while Bulgars led by Alcek settled in Sepino, Bojano, and Isernia. These Bulgars preserved their speech and identity until the late 8th century.

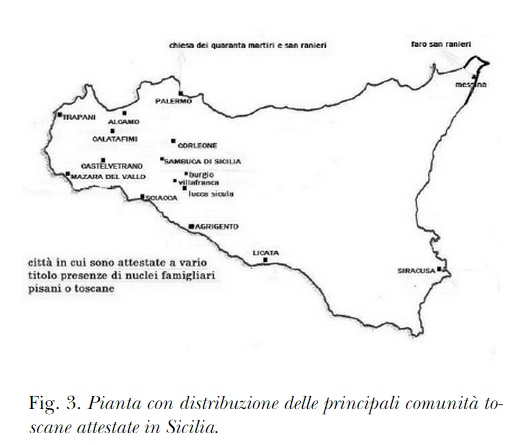
Map of Tuscan settlements in Sicily.

Following Roman rule, Sicily, Corsica, and Sardinia were conquered by the Vandals, then by the Ostrogoths, and finally by the Byzantines. Sicily was later invaded by the Arabs in the 9th century and the Normans in the 11th century, leading to the formation of a unique Norman-Arab-Byzantine culture in Sicily. During the subsequent Swabian rule under the Holy Roman Emperor Frederick II, who spent most of his life as king of Sicily in his court in Palermo, Moors were progressively eradicated until the massive deportation of the last Muslims of Sicily. As a result of the Arab expulsion, many towns across Sicily were left depopulated. By the 12th century, Swabian kings granted immigrants from northern Italy (particularly Piedmont, Lombardy and Liguria), Latium and Tuscany in central Italy, and French regions of Normandy, Provence and Brittany (all collectively known as Lombards.) settlement into Sicily, re-establishing the Latin element into the island, a legacy which can be seen in the many Gallo-Italic dialects and towns found in the interior and western parts of Sicily, brought by these settlers. Before them, other Lombards arrived in Sicily, with an expedition departed in 1038, led by the Byzantine commander George Maniakes, which for a very short time managed to snatch Messina and Syracuse from Arab rule. The Lombards who arrived with the Byzantines settled in Maniace, Randazzo and Troina, while a group of Genoese and other Lombards from Liguria settled in Caltagirone. After the marriage between the Norman Roger I of Sicily and Adelaide del Vasto, descendant of the Aleramici family, many Northern Italian colonisers (known collectively as Lombards) left their homeland, in the Aleramici's possessions in Piedmont and Liguria (then known as Lombardy), to settle on the island of Sicily. It is believed that the Lombard immigrants in Sicily over a couple of centuries were a total of about 200,000. An estimated 20,000 Swabians and 40,000 Normans settled in the southern half of Italy during the 10th and 11th centuries. Additional Tuscan migrants settled in Sicily after the Florentine conquest of Pisa in 1406.

Some of the Muslims expelled by the Normans were deported to Lucera (Lugêrah, as it was known in Arabic). Their numbers eventually reached between 15,000 and 20,000, leading Lucera to be called Lucaera Saracenorum because it represented the last stronghold of Islamic presence in Italy. The colony thrived for 75 years until it was sacked in 1300 by Christian forces under the command of the Angevin Charles II of Naples. The city's Muslim inhabitants were exiled or sold into slavery. After the expulsions of Muslims in Lucera, Charles II replaced Lucera's Saracens with Christians, chiefly Burgundian and Provençal soldiers and farmers, following an initial settlement of 140 Provençal families in 1273. A remnant of the descendants of these Provençal colonists, still speaking a Franco-Provençal dialect, has survived until the present day in the villages of Faeto and Celle di San Vito.

=== Modern period ===
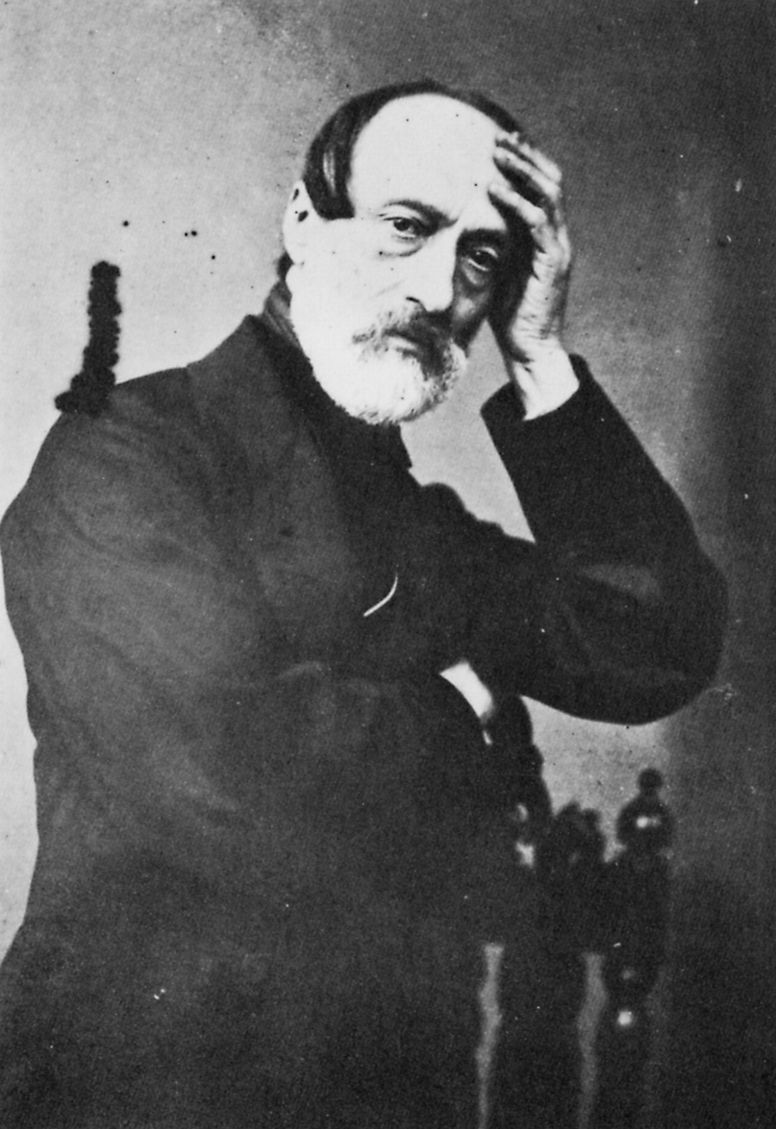
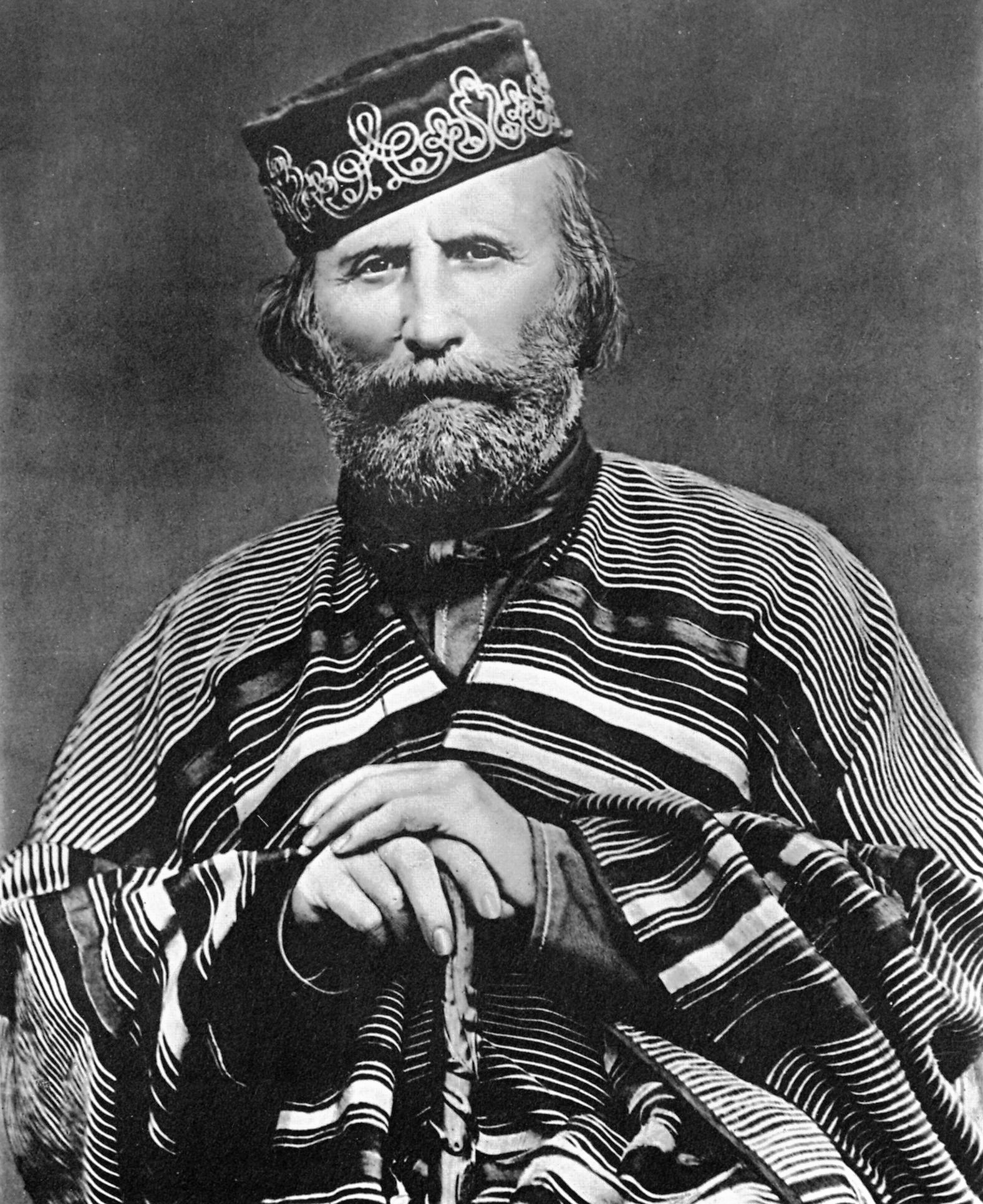
Giuseppe Mazzini (left), highly influential leader of the Italian revolutionary movement; and Giuseppe Garibaldi (right), celebrated as one of the greatest generals of modern times and as the "Hero of the Two Worlds", who commanded and fought in many military campaigns that led to Italian unification

Substantial migrations of Lombards to Naples, Rome, and Palermo continued in the 16th and 17th centuries, driven by the constant overcrowding in the north. Minor but significant settlements of Slavs and Arbereshe in Italy have been recorded, while Scottish soldiers – the Garde Ecossaise – who served the French King, Francis I, settled in the mountains of Piedmont.

The geographical and cultural proximity with Southern Italy pushed Albanians to cross the Strait of Otranto, especially after Skanderbeg's death and the conquest of the Balkans by the Ottomans. In defense of the Christian religion and in search of soldiers loyal to the Spanish crown, Alfonso V of Aragon, also king of Naples, invited Arbereshe soldiers to move to Italy with their families. In return the king guaranteed to Albanians lots of land and a favourable taxation.

Arbereshe and Schiavoni were used to repopulate abandoned villages or villages whose population had died in earthquakes, plagues and other catastrophes. Albanian soldiers were also used to quell rebellions in Calabria. Slavic colonies were established in eastern Friuli, Sicily and Molise (Molise Croats).

Between the Late Middle Ages and the early modern period, there were several waves of immigration of Albanians into Italy, in addition to another in the 20th century. The descendants of these Albanian emigrants, many still retaining the Albanian language, the Arbëresh dialect, have survived throughout southern Italy, numbering about 260,000 people, with roughly 80,000 to 100,000 speaking the Albanian language.

=== Italian Surnames ===
Most of Italy's surnames (cognomi), with the exception of a few areas marked by linguistic minorities, derive from Italian. Many are derived from an individual's physical qualities (e.g. Rossi, Bianchi, Quattrocchi, Mancini, Grasso, etc.), occupation (Ferrari, Auditore, Sartori, Tagliabue, etc.), fatherhood or lack thereof (De Pretis, Orfanelli, Esposito, Trovato, etc.), and geographic location (Padovano, Pisano, Leccese, Lucchese, etc.). Some of them also indicate a remote foreign origin (Greco, Tedesco, Moro, Albanese, etc.).

Most common surnames
| 1 | Rossi |
| 2 | Ferrari |
| 3 | Russo |
| 4 | Bianchi |
| 5 | Romano |
| 6 | Gallo |
| 7 | Costa |
| 8 | Fontana |
| 9 | Conti |
| 10 | Esposito |
| 11 | Ricci |
| 12 | Bruno |
| 13 | Rizzo |
| 14 | Moretti |
| 15 | De Luca |
| 16 | Marino |
| 17 | Greco |
| 18 | Barbieri |
| 19 | Lombardi |
| 20 | Giordano |

== Italian diaspora ==
| Censuses (Resident population) | 1981 | 1991 | 2001 | 2011 | 2021 | 2022 | 2023 |
|---|---|---|---|---|---|---|---|
| Italians by birth (1981/1991 Total Italian citizens) | 56.345.973 (99,63%) | 56.421.872 (99,37%) | 55.375.073 (97,16%) | 54.734.723 (92,09%) | 52.460.242 (88,87%) | 52.146.522 (88,39%) | 51.855.553 (87,93%) |
| Naturalized Italians | | | 285.782 (0,50%) | 671.394 (1,13%) | 1.539.175 (2,61%) | 1.709.338 (2,90%) | 1.862.019 (3,16%) |
| Foreigners | 210.938 (0,37%) | 356.159 (0,63%) | 1.334.889 (2,34%) | 4.027.627 (6,78%) | 5.030.716 (8,52%) | 5.141.341 (8,71%) | 5.253.658 (8,91%) |
| Total population | 56.556.911 | 56.778.031 | 56.995.744 | 59.433.744 | 59.030.133 | 58.997.201 | 58.971.230 |

Italian diaspora worldwide Italy + 10,000,000 + 1,000,000 + 100,000 + 10,000

Italian migration outside Italy occurred over centuries in a series of migration cycles. A large diaspora took place after Italy's unification in 1861 and continued through 1914 with the lead up to the First World War. One major motivation for emigrants at this time was a post-unification economic slump within Italy (except for the "industrial triangle" between Milan, Genoa and Turin) that coincided with a boom in industrialization, urbanization, and economic expansion elsewhere in the world, which provided better economic opportunities. Large-scale emigration continued through the late 1920s, well into the Fascist regime, and a subsequent wave was observed after the end of the Second World War. Another wave of migration outside Italy began in the 21st century and is still ongoing, caused by the debt crisis in Italy.

Napoleon, the most notable Italian French personality. He was ethnically Italian of Corsican origin, and his family was of Genoese and Tuscan ancestry.

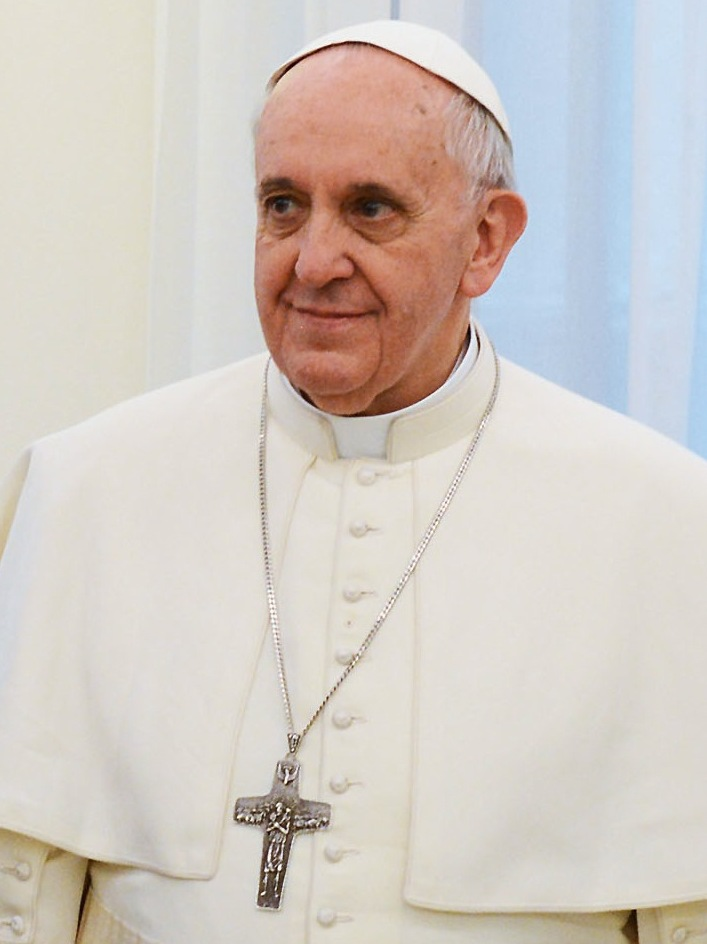
Pope Francis, an Argentine of Italian descent. About 60% of Argentina's population has Italian ancestry.

Over 80 million people claiming full or partial Italian descent live outside Italy. A majority of these, about 50 million total, live in South America. Brazil has the largest number of Italian descendants outside Italy, and in Argentina, over 62.5% of the country's population has at least one Italian ancestor. Another 23 million Italian descendants live in North America (United States and Canada), 7 to 8 million in other parts of Europe (primarily in France, Germany, Switzerland, and the United Kingdom), and another 1 million in Oceania (Australia and New Zealand). To a lesser extent, people of full or partial Italian descent are also found in Africa (particularly in the former Italian colonies of Eritrea, Somalia, Libya, and Ethiopia; and in others countries such as South Africa, Tunisia, and Egypt), in the Middle East (such as the United Arab Emirates with 10,000 Italian immigrants), and in Asia (Singapore is home to a sizeable Italian community).

World map of first level subdivisions (states, counties, provinces, etc.) that are home to Little Italys or Italian neighbourhoods

== Culture ==
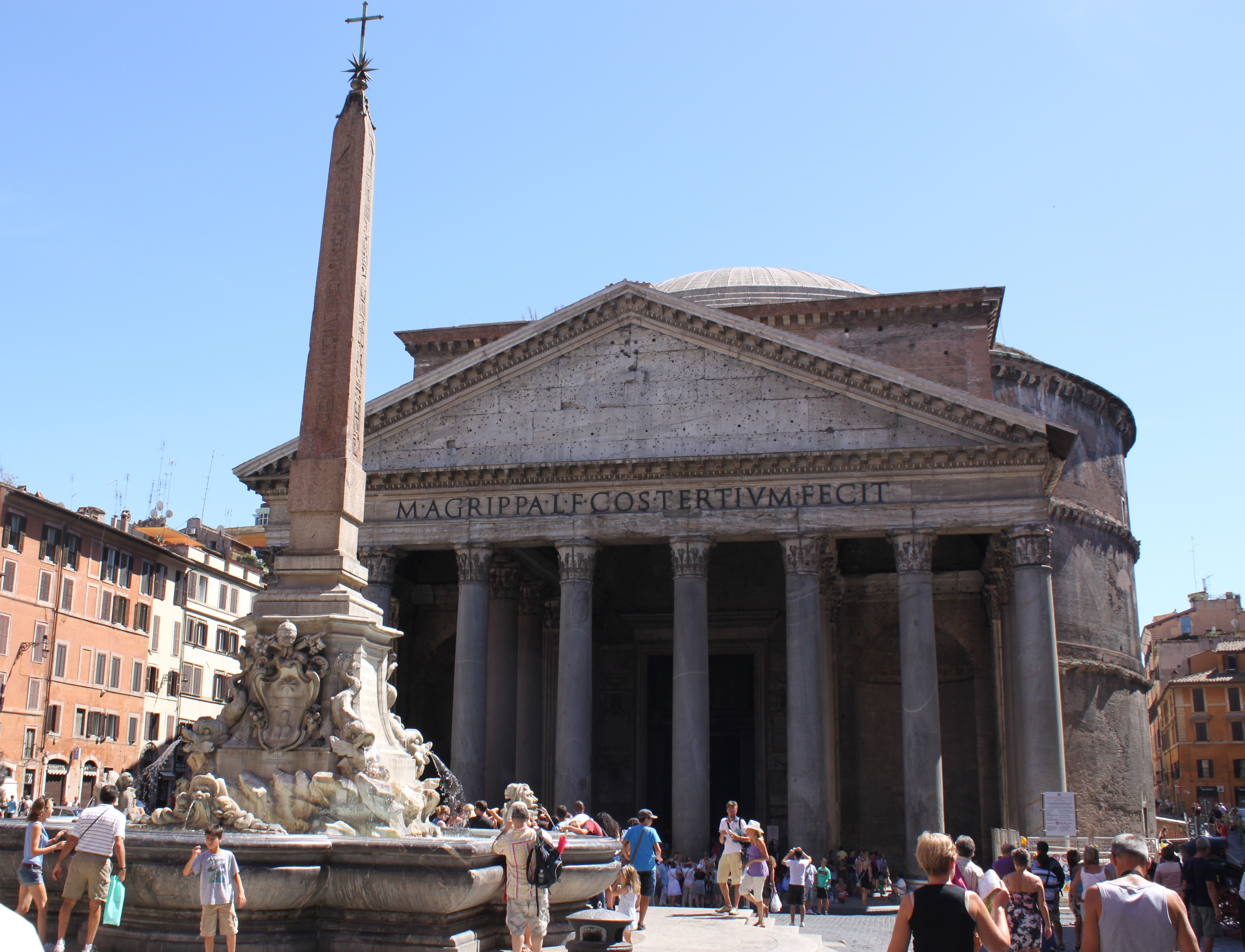
The Pantheon and the Fontana del Pantheon. Roman relics and Roman culture are important symbols in Italy.

Italy is considered one of the birthplaces of Western civilization and has been described as a cultural superpower. Italian culture is incredibly diverse, spanning the entire Italian peninsula plus Sardinia and Sicily. Italy was the origin of phenomena of international impact including the Roman Republic, Roman Empire, the Roman Catholic Church, the Maritime republics, Romanesque art, Scholasticism, the Rinascimento, the Age of Discovery, Mannerism, the Scientific Revolution, the Baroque, Neoclassicism, Fascism, and European integration.

Italy became a seat of learning in 1088 with the establishment of the University of Bologna, the first university and the oldest in continuous operation. The Schola Medica Salernitana, in southern Italy, the first medical school in Europe, and many other centers of higher education followed. The European Renaissance began in Italy and was powered by leading Italian painters, sculptors, architects, scientists, literature authors, and music composers. Italy continued to influence European cultural throughout the Baroque period and into the Romantic period, with a strong Italian presence in music.

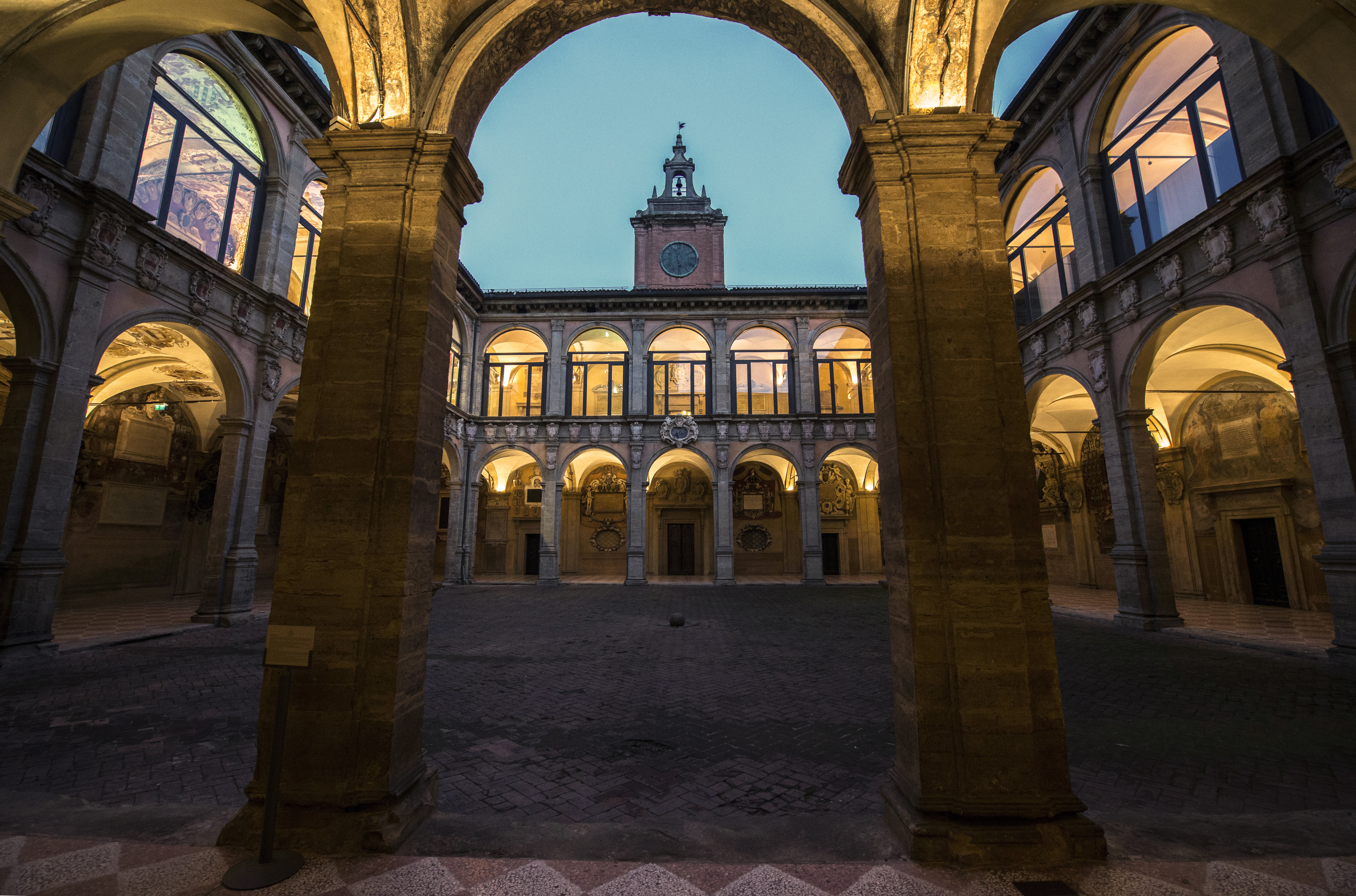
Bologna University, established in AD 1088, is the world's oldest university in continuous operation.

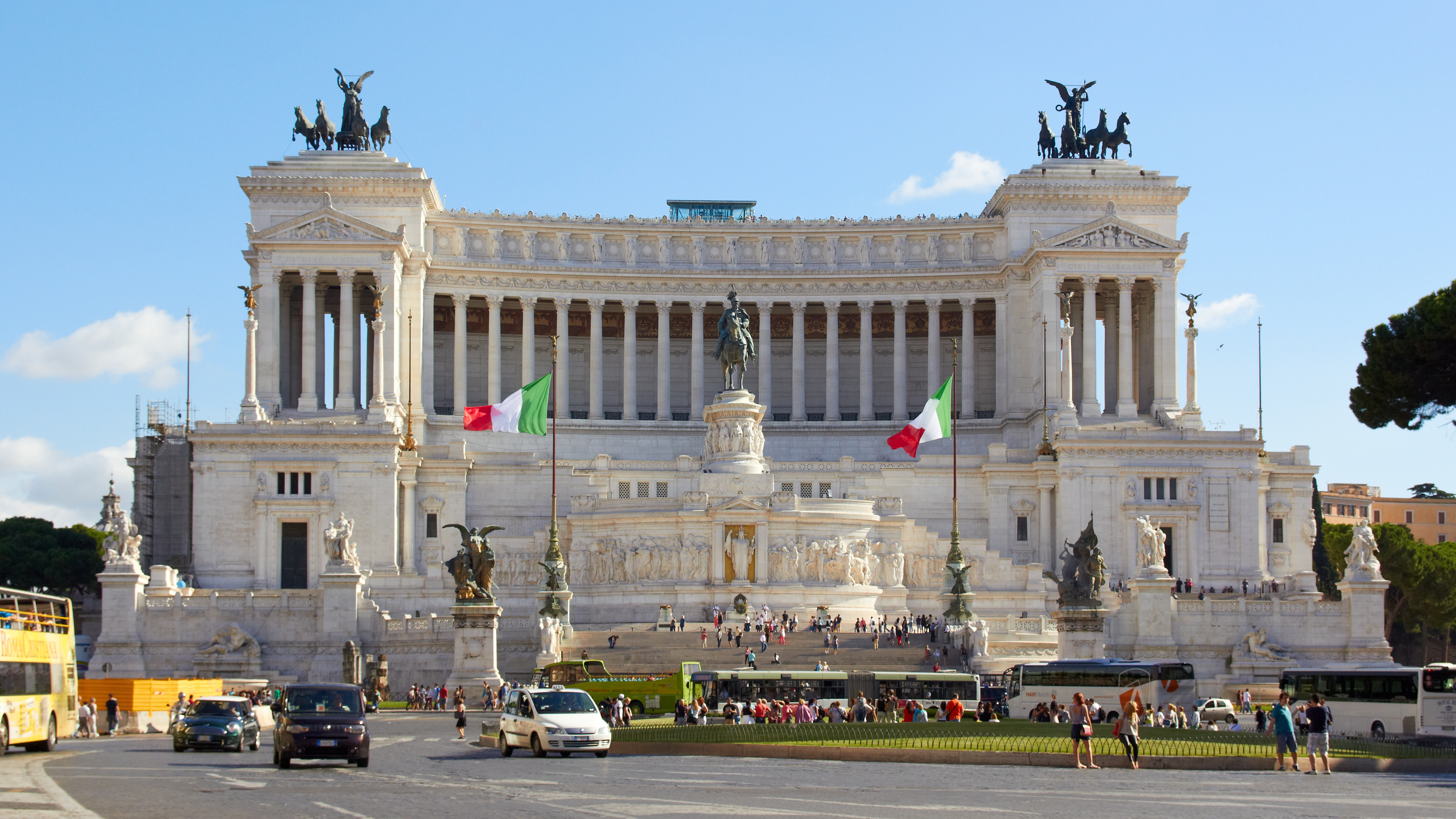
The Victor Emmanuel II Monument in Rome, a national symbol of Italy celebrating the first king of the unified country, and resting place of the Italian Unknown Soldier since the end of World War I. It was inaugurated in 1911, on the occasion of the 50th Anniversary of the Unification of Italy.

The country contains several world-famous cities. Rome was the capital of the ancient Roman Empire, the seat of the Pope of the Catholic Church, and the capital of reunified Italy. Florence was the heart of the Renaissance. Turin, which used to be the capital of Italy, is a center of automobile engineering. Milan is the industrial and financial capital of Italy and one of the world's fashion capitals. Venice's intricate canal system attracts tourists from all over the world especially during the Venetian Carnival and the Biennale. Naples has the largest historic city center in Europe and the world's oldest continuously active public opera house. Due to its relatively late national unification and the historical autonomy of the regions that comprise the Italian peninsula, many Italian traditions and customs can be identified by their regions of origin.

== Philosophy ==
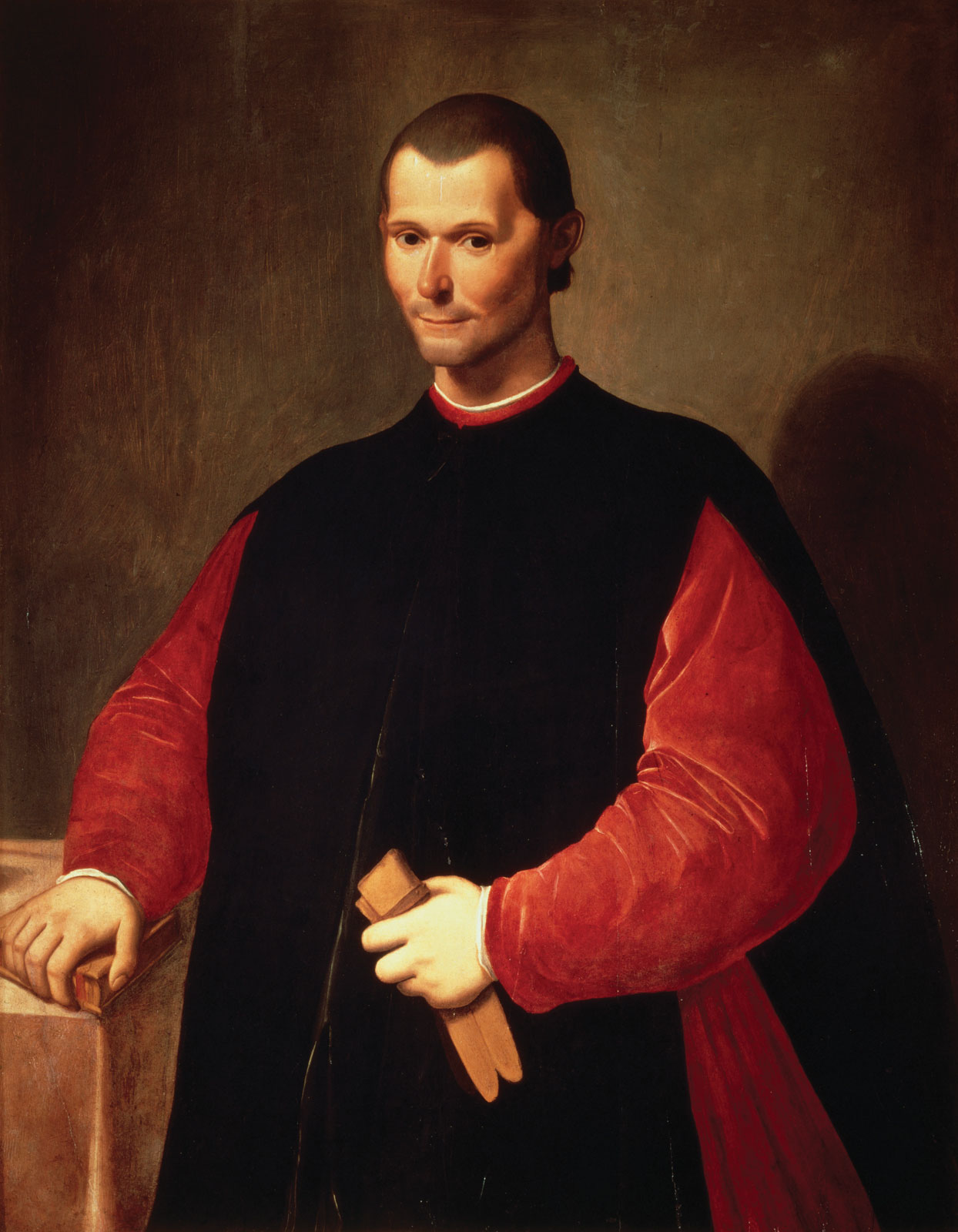
Niccolò Machiavelli, the founder of modern political science and ethics

Italian literature had a significant influence on Western philosophy, from the ancient Greeks and Romans, to the Rinascimento, to the Enlightenment, to modern philosophy.

Medieval Italian philosophy was mainly influenced by Christianity. Saint Thomas Aquinas was a Dominican theologian, experimentalist, and professor at the University of Paris from the Kingdom of Sicily. Aquinas was notable for introducing a framework of Aristotelian philosophy to Christian theology.

Major Italian cities like Rome, Milan, Venice, Padua, Bologna and Naples – which hosted important universities and an abundance of coffeeshops, which became hubs for intellectual conversation – were centers of scholarship in Enlightenment Europe. Italy was the home of several important philosophers, such as Giambattista Vico (who is widely considered the founder of modern Italian philosophy) and Antonio Genovesi; scientists such as Alessandro Volta and Luigi Galvani; Cesare Beccaria (considered one of the fathers of classical criminal theory and modern penology, who penned one of the earliest prominent condemnations of torture and th edeath penalty).

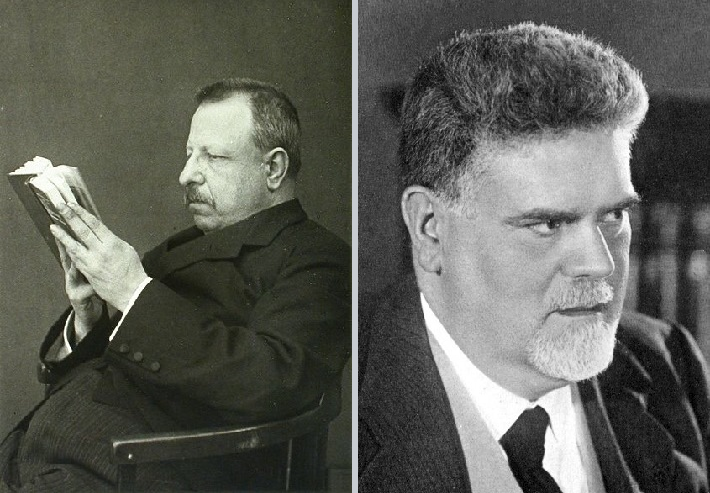
Benedetto Croce (left) and Giovanni Gentile (right), the two greatest exponents of the Italian idealism

Some of the most prominent philosophies and ideologies of the late 19th and 20th centuries were developed in Italy, including anarchism, communism, socialism, futurism, fascism, and Christian democracy. Some notable Italian philosophers in the era include Antonio Rosmini, the founder of Italian idealism; Giovanni Gentile, an idealist and fascist philosopher; and Antonio Gramsci, an important philosopher within Marxist and communist theory, credited with creating the theory of cultural hegemony. Italian fascism was the official philosophy and ideology of the Italian government from the 1920s to the 1940s led by Benito Mussolini.

Early Italian feminists include Sibilla Aleramo, Alaide Gualberta Beccari, and Anna Maria Mozzoni, although proto-feminist philosophies had previously been explored by earlier Italian writers such as Christine de Pizan, Moderata Fonte, and Lucrezia Marinella. Italian physician and educator Maria Montessori is credited with the creation of the Montessori philosophy of education. Giuseppe Peano was one of the founders of analytic philosophy and contemporary philosophy of mathematics. Italian analytic philosophers writing in the 21st century include Carlo Penco, Gloria Origgi, Pieranna Garavaso and Luciano Floridi.

== Literature ==
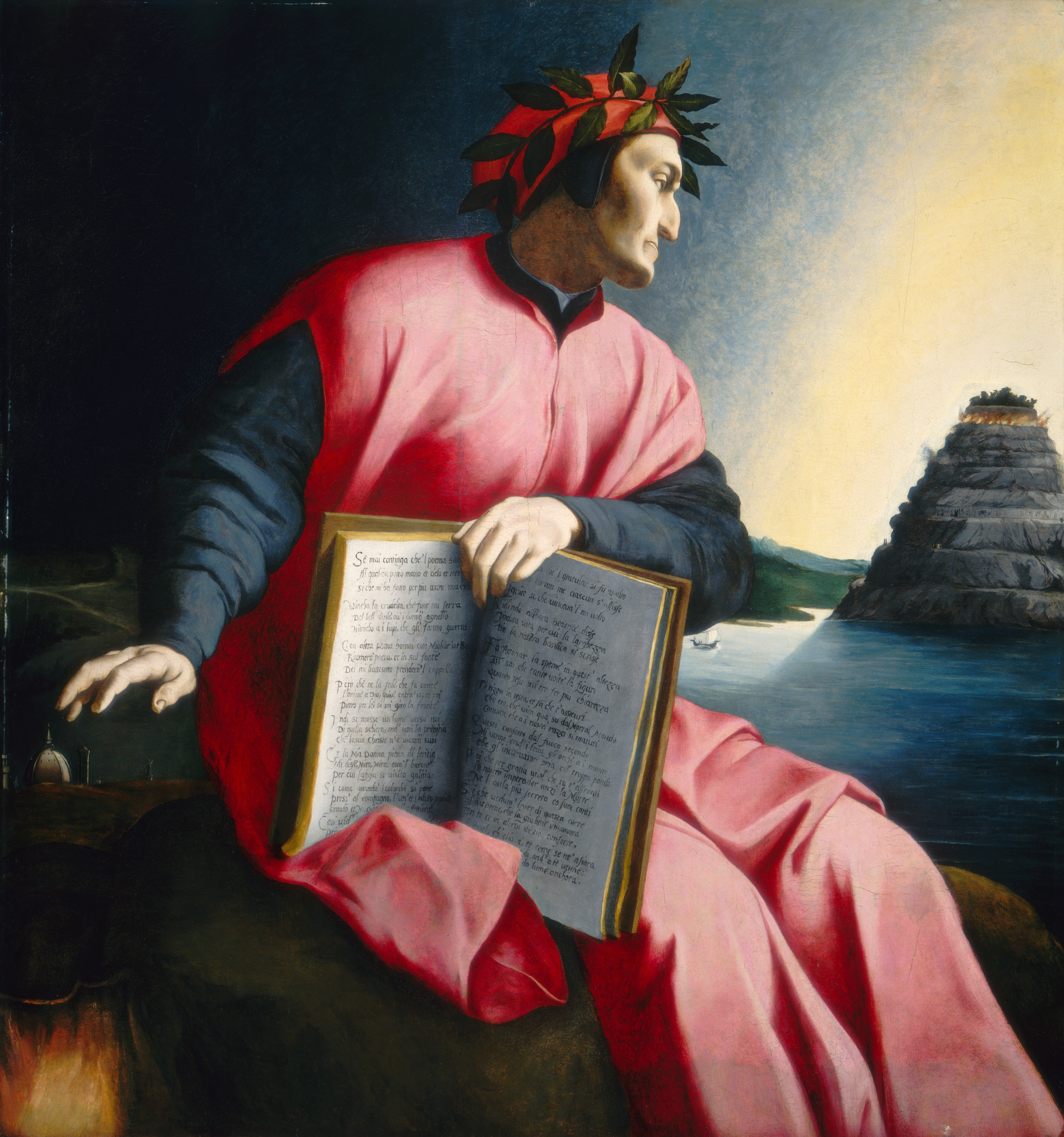
Dante Alighieri, whose works helped establish modern Italian language, is considered one of the greatest poets of the Middle Ages. His epic poem Divine Comedy ranks among the finest works of world literature.

Formal Latin literature began in 240 BC, when the first stage play was performed in Rome. The Romans were famous for their poets, dramatists, orators, philosophers, and historians; important figures included Pliny the Elder, Pliny the Younger, Virgil, Horace, Propertius, Ovid, and Livy.

Saint Francis of Assisi is widely considered the first Italian poet, with his religious song Canticle of the Sun. Notable poets in the Middle Ages include Dante Alighieri, Petrarch, and Giovanni Boccaccio.

During the Renaissance, humanists such as Leonardo Bruni, Coluccio Salutati and Niccolò Machiavelli published important histories and philosophical writings. Philosophers during the Age of Enlightenment, such as Apostolo Zeno and Metastasio, disseminated their ideas across Europe. Carlo Goldoni, a Venetian playwright and librettist, created the comedy of character. The leading figure of the 18th-century Italian literary revival was Giuseppe Parini.

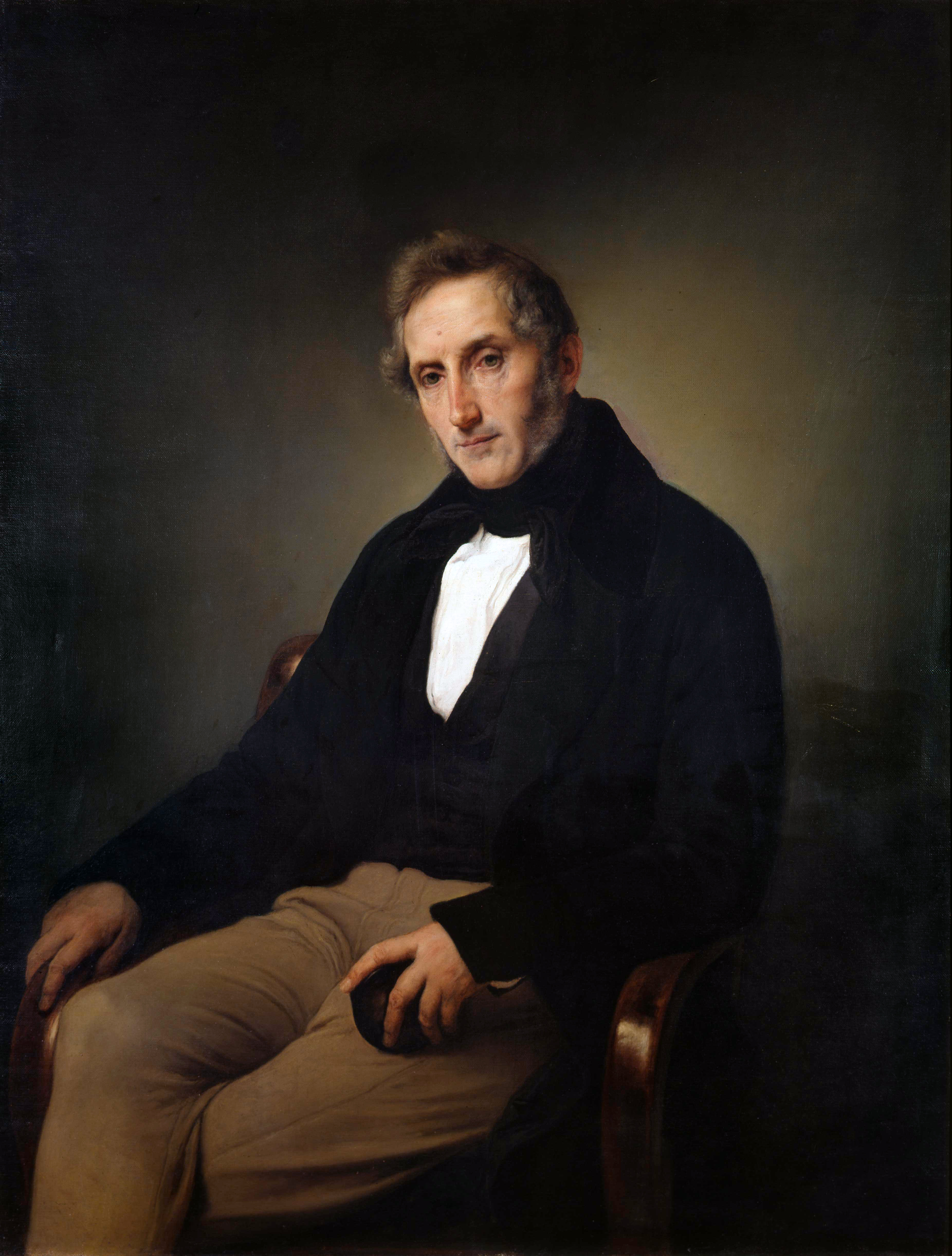
Alessandro Manzoni is famous for the novel The Betrothed (1827), generally ranked among the masterpieces of world literature. He contributed to the nationwide use of the Italian language.

Giacomo Leopardi was an influential poet in the 19th century, known for his radical views. Italian novelists include Alessandro Manzoni, author of the historical novel I promessi sposi ("The Betrothed"); Italo Svevo, author of La coscienza di Zeno; Luigi Pirandello, winner of the 1934 Nobel Prize in Literature; and Federigo Tozzi and Giuseppe Ungaretti, pioneers of existentialism in the European novel.

Modern literary figures and Nobel laureates include Gabriele D'Annunzio, nationalist poet Giosuè Carducci, realist writer Grazia Deledda, theatre author Luigi Pirandello, short story writer Italo Calvino, poet Salvatore Quasimodo, poet Eugenio Montale, Umberto Eco, and satirist and theatre author Dario Fo.

== Politics ==
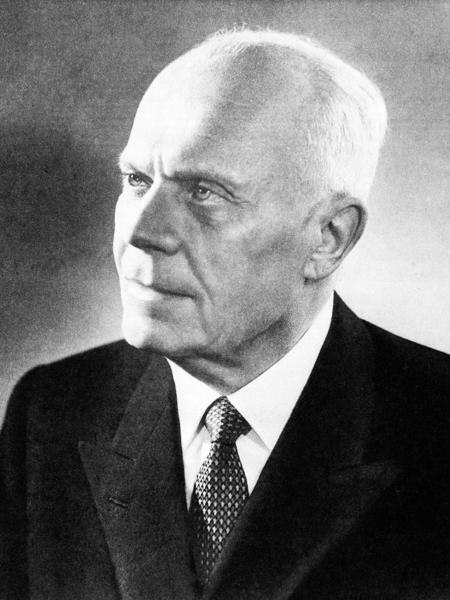
Sandro Pertini

The politics of Italy are conducted through a parliamentary republic with a multi-party system. Italy has been a democratic republic since 2 June 1946, when the monarchy was abolished by popular referendum. Executive power is exercised by the Council of Ministers, which is led by the Prime Minister, officially referred to as "President of the Council" (Presidente del Consiglio). Legislative power is primarily vested in the two houses of Parliament, but the Council of Ministers can introduce bills and holds the majority in both houses. The judiciary is independent of the executive and the legislative branches. The President presides over the High Council of the Judiciary as the head of state, a position that is separate from all three branches.

The Presidents of Italy were Enrico De Nicola, Luigi Einaudi, Giovanni Gronchi, Antonio Segni, Giuseppe Saragat, Giovanni Leone, Sandro Pertini, Francesco Cossiga, Oscar Luigi Scalfaro, Carlo Azeglio Ciampi, Giorgio Napolitano and Sergio Mattarella.

The legal and social status of Italian women has undergone rapid transformations and changes during the past decades. This includes family laws, the enactment of anti-discrimination measures, and reforms to the penal code (in particular with regard to crimes of violence against women). After World War II, women were given the right to vote in 1946 Italian institutional referendum. The new Italian Constitution of 1948 affirmed that women had equal rights. It was not however until the 1970s that women in Italy scored some major achievements with the introduction of laws regulating divorce (1970), abortion (1978), and the approval in 1975 of the new family code. Today, women have the same legal rights as men in Italy, and have mainly the same job, business, and education opportunities.

== Law and justice ==
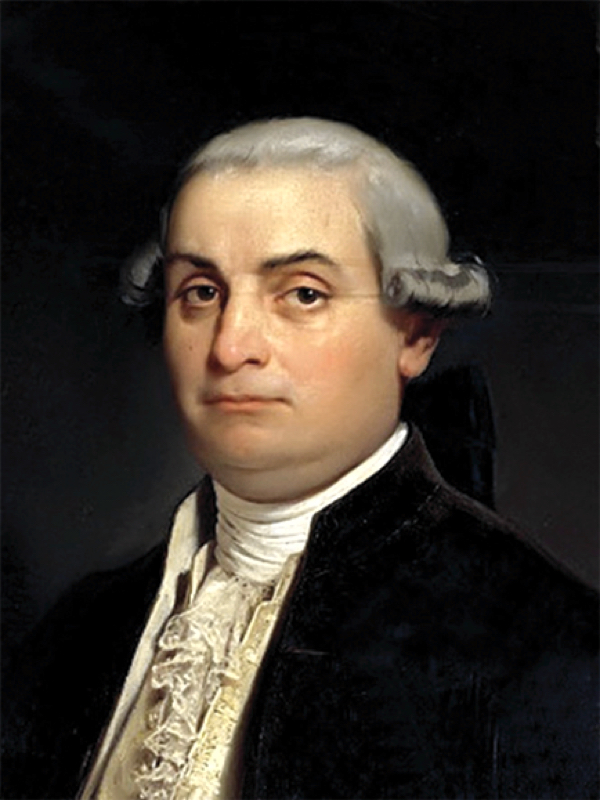
Cesare Beccaria

Since the Roman Empire, most western contributions to Western legal culture was the emergence of a class of Roman jurists. During the Middle Ages, Saint Thomas Aquinas integrated the theory of natural law with the notion of an eternal and Biblical law. During the Renaissance, Professor Alberico Gentili, the founder of the science of international law, authored the first treatise on public international law, and separated secular law from canon law and Catholic theology. Enlightenment's greatest legal theorists, Cesare Beccaria, Giambattista Vico and Francesco Mario Pagano, are remembered for their legal works, particularly on criminal law. Francesco Carrara, an advocate of abolition of the death penalty, was one of the foremost European criminal lawyers of the 19th century. During the last periods, numerous Italians have been recognised as prominent prosecutor magistrates.

== Economy ==
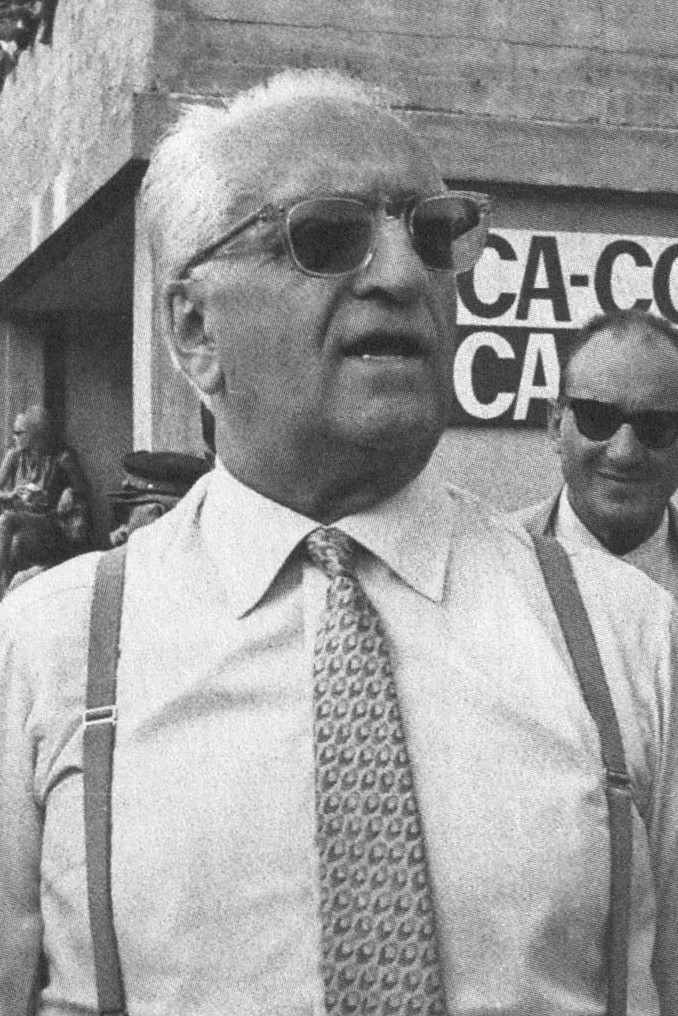
Enzo Ferrari

The economy of Italy is a highly developed social market economy. It is the third-largest national economy in the European Union, the 10th-largest in the world by nominal GDP, and the 12th-largest by GDP (PPP). Italy is a founding member of the European Union, the Eurozone, the OECD, the G7 and the G20; it is the eighth-largest exporter in the world, with $611 billion exported in 2021. Its closest trade ties are with the other countries of the European Union, with whom it conducts about 59% of its total trade; Italy's largest trading partners, in order of market share in exports, are Germany (12.5%), France (10.3%), the United States (9%), Spain (5.2%), the United Kingdom (5.2%) and Switzerland (4.6%).

In the post-World War II period, Italy saw a transformation from an agriculture-based economy, which had been severely affected by the consequences of the World Wars, into one of the world's leading countries in world trade and exports. Italy is the seventh-largest manufacturing country, characterised by many small and medium-sized enterprises, with fewer global multinational corporations than other economies of comparable size. Italy is a large manufacturer and exporter of machinery, vehicles, pharmaceuticals, furniture, food, clothing, and other products.

Noteworthy Italian entrepreneurs include Alessandro Martini, Luigi Lavazza, Pietro Ferrero, Giovanni Agnelli, Piero Pirelli, Gaspare Campari, Adriano Olivetti, Enzo Ferrari, Ferruccio Lamborghini, Enrico Mattei, Luciano Benetton, and Giovanni Rana.

== Visual art ==
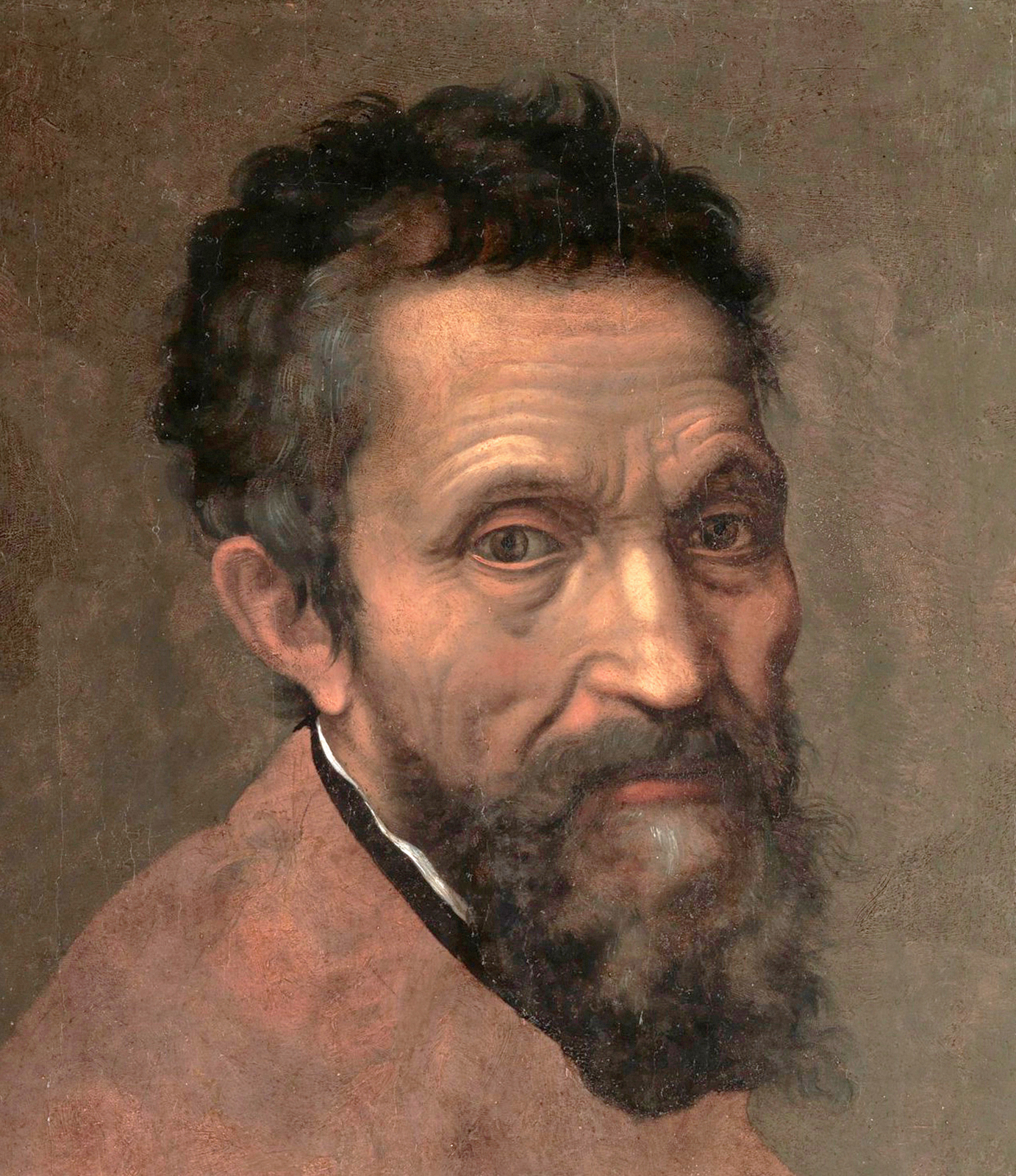
Michelangelo

Roman art was influenced by the art of ancient Greece, but Roman painting does have unique characteristics. The only surviving Roman paintings are wall paintings, many from villas in Campania, in Southern Italy. Such paintings can be grouped into four main "styles" or periods and may contain the first examples of trompe-l'œil, pseudo-perspective, and pure landscape. Panel painting became more common in Italy during the Romanesque period, under the heavy influence of Byzantine icons. Medieval art and Gothic painting trended towards realism, with interest in the depiction of volume and perspective, notably by Cimabue and then his pupil Giotto.

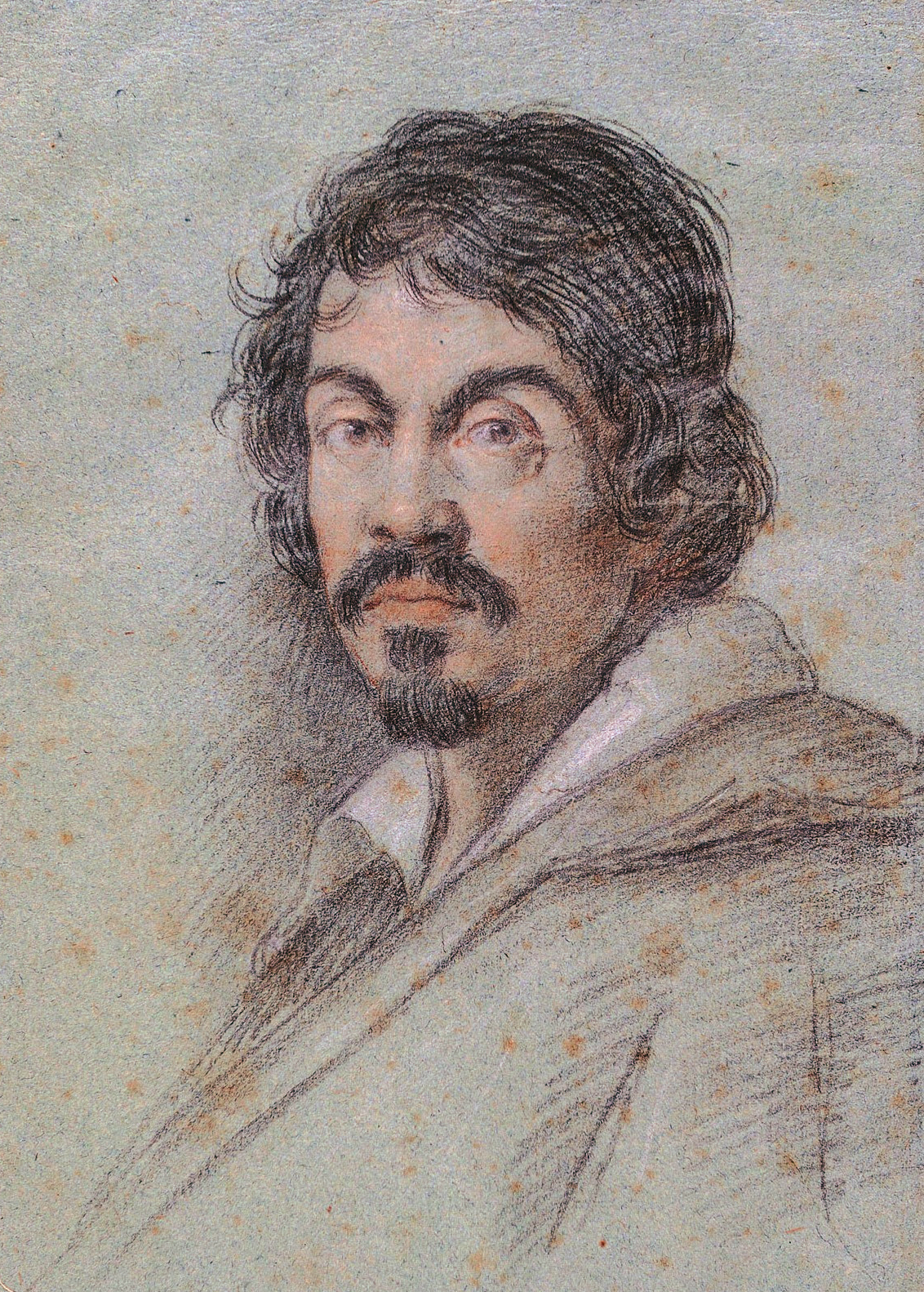
Caravaggio

The Italian Renaissance is said by many to be the golden age of painting. In Italy, artists like Paolo Uccello, Fra Angelico, Masaccio, Piero della Francesca, Andrea Mantegna, Filippo Lippi, Giorgione, Tintoretto, Sandro Botticelli, Leonardo da Vinci, Michelangelo, Raphael, Giovanni Bellini, and Titian developed refined drawing and painting techniques through the use of perspective and the study of human anatomy and proportion. Michelangelo was active as a sculptor from about 1500 to 1520, producing famous works such as his David, Pietà, and Moses. Other significant Renaissance sculptors include Lorenzo Ghiberti, Luca Della Robbia, Donatello, Filippo Brunelleschi and Andrea del Verrocchio.

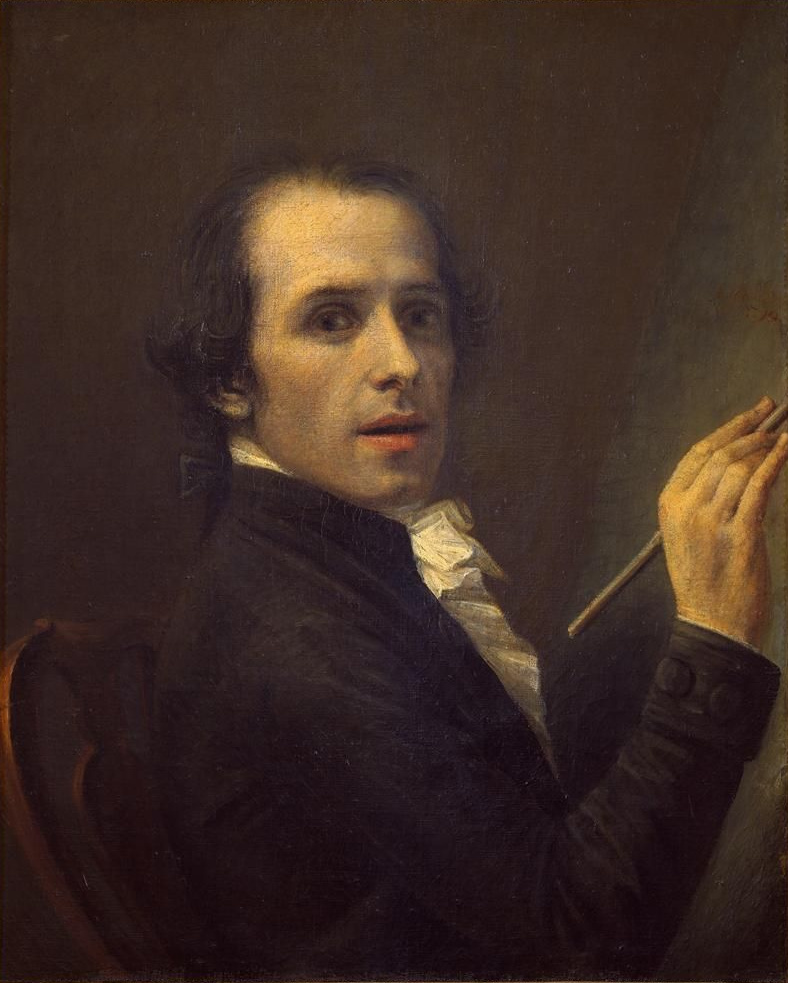
Antonio Canova

In the 15th and 16th centuries, the High Renaissance gave rise to a stylised art known as mannerism. In place of the balanced compositions and rational approach to perspective that characterised the early Renaissance, the Mannerists sought instability, artifice, and doubt. The unperturbed faces and gestures of Piero della Francesca and the calm Virgins of Raphael are replaced by the troubled expressions of Pontormo and the emotional intensity of El Greco.

17th century Italian Baroque painters include Caravaggio, Annibale Carracci, Artemisia Gentileschi, Mattia Preti, Carlo Saraceni and Bartolomeo Manfredi. In the 18th century, French Rococo inspired the Italian Rococo movement, with artists such as Giovanni Battista Tiepolo and Canaletto. Antonio Canova's Italian Neoclassical sculpture focused on the idealist aspect of the movement.

Some major Italian Romantic painters from the 19th century were Francesco Hayez, Giuseppe Bezzuoli and Francesco Podesti. Impressionism was brought to Italy from France by the Macchiaioli movement, led by Giovanni Fattori and Giovanni Boldini, and Realism style, led by Gioacchino Toma and Giuseppe Pellizza da Volpedo. In the 20th century, Italian art was revolutionized by the Futurism movement, primarily through the sculptural works of Umberto Boccioni and Giacomo Balla, and the metaphysical paintings of Giorgio de Chirico, who influenced later Surrealist artists like Bruno Caruso and Renato Guttuso.

== Music ==
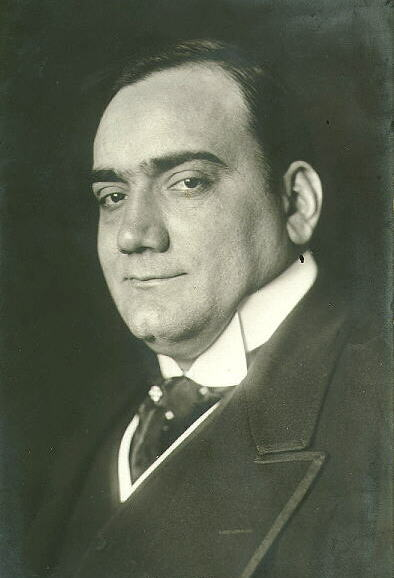
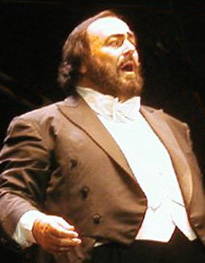
History's most successful tenors, Enrico Caruso (above) and Luciano Pavarotti (below)

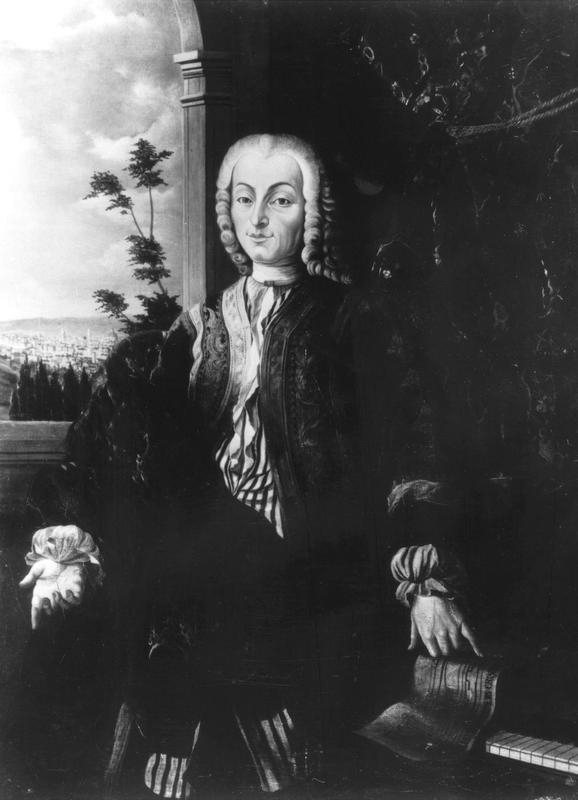
Bartolomeo Cristofori, the inventor of the piano

Several instruments associated with classical music, including the piano and violin, were invented in Italy; and many of the prevailing classical music forms, such as the symphony, concerto, and sonata, can trace their roots back to innovations of 16th- and 17th-century Italian music. Italian opera was founded in the early 17th century in cities such as Mantua and Venice, and has been influential on the Western opera tradition.

Notable Italians composers include Giovanni Pierluigi da Palestrina; Claudio Monteverdi; the Baroque composers Scarlatti, Corelli, and Vivaldi; the Classical composers Paganini and Rossini; and the Romantic composers Bellini, Donizetti, Verdi, and Puccini, whose operas, including La bohème, Tosca, Madama Butterfly, and Turandot, are among the most frequently worldwide performed in the standard repertoire. In the Post Romantic era, the composer Ottorino Respighi was also recognized internationally for his symphonic tone poems: Pines of Rome, Fountains of Rome and Roman Festivals. Modern Italian composers such as Berio, Maderna, and Nono proved significant in the development of experimental and electronic music.

Starting in the late 19th century, Italians also emerged as notable conductors and musical directors of operatic and symphonic orchestras on the international concert hall stage. Included among them were: Arturo Toscanini, and Victor de Sabata,. In the modern era, several others followed their lead including: Claudio Abbado, Riccardo Chailly, Carlo Maria Giulini, Fabio Luisi, Riccardo Muti, and Gianandrea Noseda,. Others achieved international acclaim as principal orchestral musicians including Ernesto Köhler, Leonardo De Lorenzo.

Jazz found a particularly strong foothold among Italians in the 1920s and remained popular despite the xenophobic cultural policies of the Fascist regime. Later, Italy embraced the progressive rock movement of the 1970s, with bands like PFM and Goblin, as well as disco and electronic music. Italo disco, characterised by a futuristic sound and prominent usage of synthesizers and drum machines, was one of the earliest electronic dance genres and influenced Euro disco. Giorgio Moroder, three-time Academy Award winner, was highly influential in the development of EDM. Italian pop music is represented annually with the Sanremo Music Festival, which served as inspiration for the Eurovision song contest, and the Festival of Two Worlds in Spoleto. Singers such as pop diva Mina, classical crossover artist Andrea Bocelli, Grammy winner Laura Pausini, and European chart-topper Eros Ramazzotti have attained international acclaim.

== Theatre and dance ==
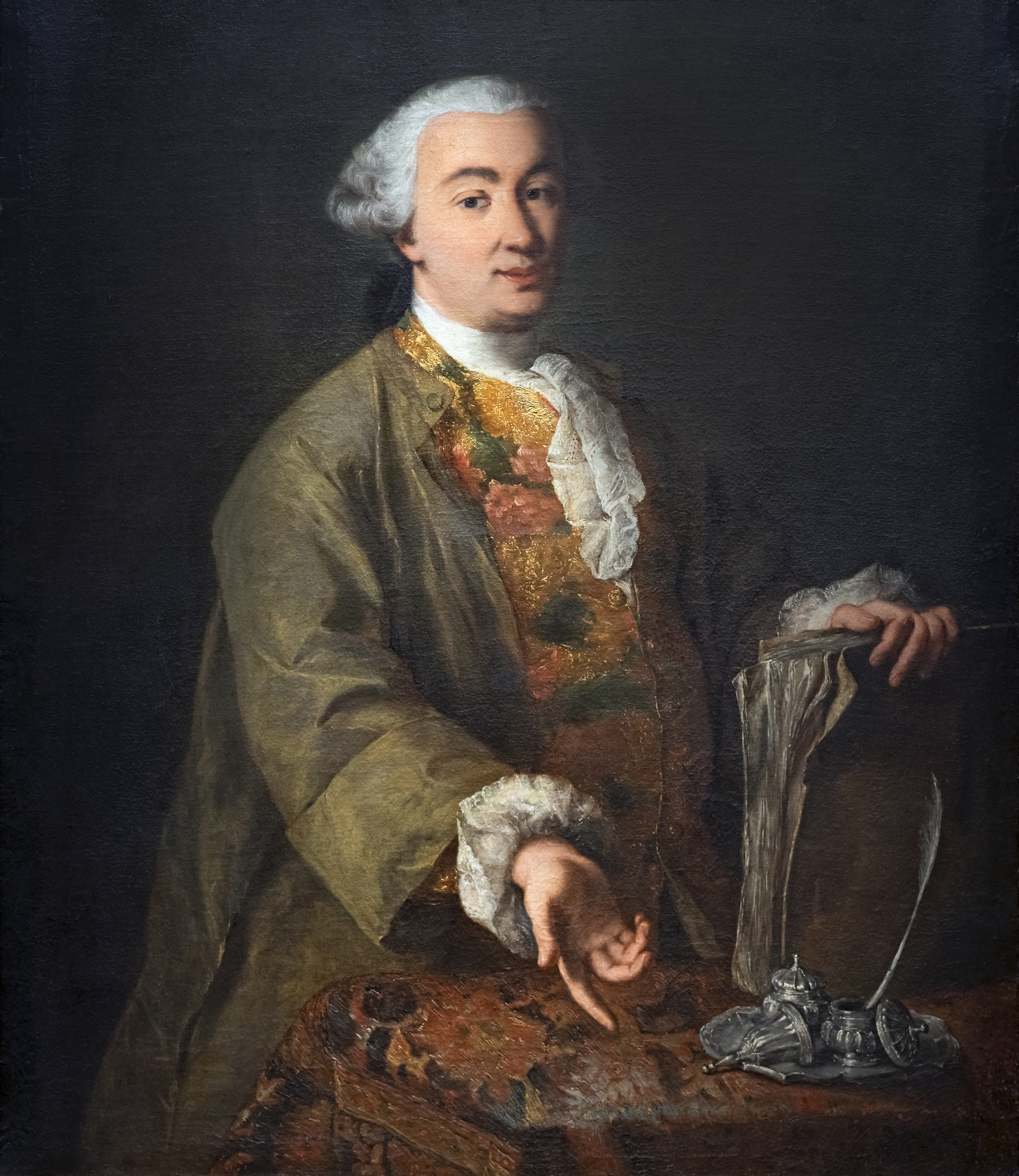
Carlo Goldoni

The traditions of Italian theatre have their origins in the ancient Greek colonies of Magna Graecia in Southern Italy and the theatre of the Italic peoples and ancient Rome. During the Middle Ages, Italian theatre was expansive, comprising the dramatization of Catholic liturgies, the court performances of jesters, the songs of troubadours, and public city festivals. Renaissance theatre was marked by a resurgence of the classics; ancient theatrical texts were re-discovered, translated from Latin to Italian, and performed. The cities of Ferrara and Rome played a prominent role in the rediscovery and renewal of theatrical art in the fifteenth century.

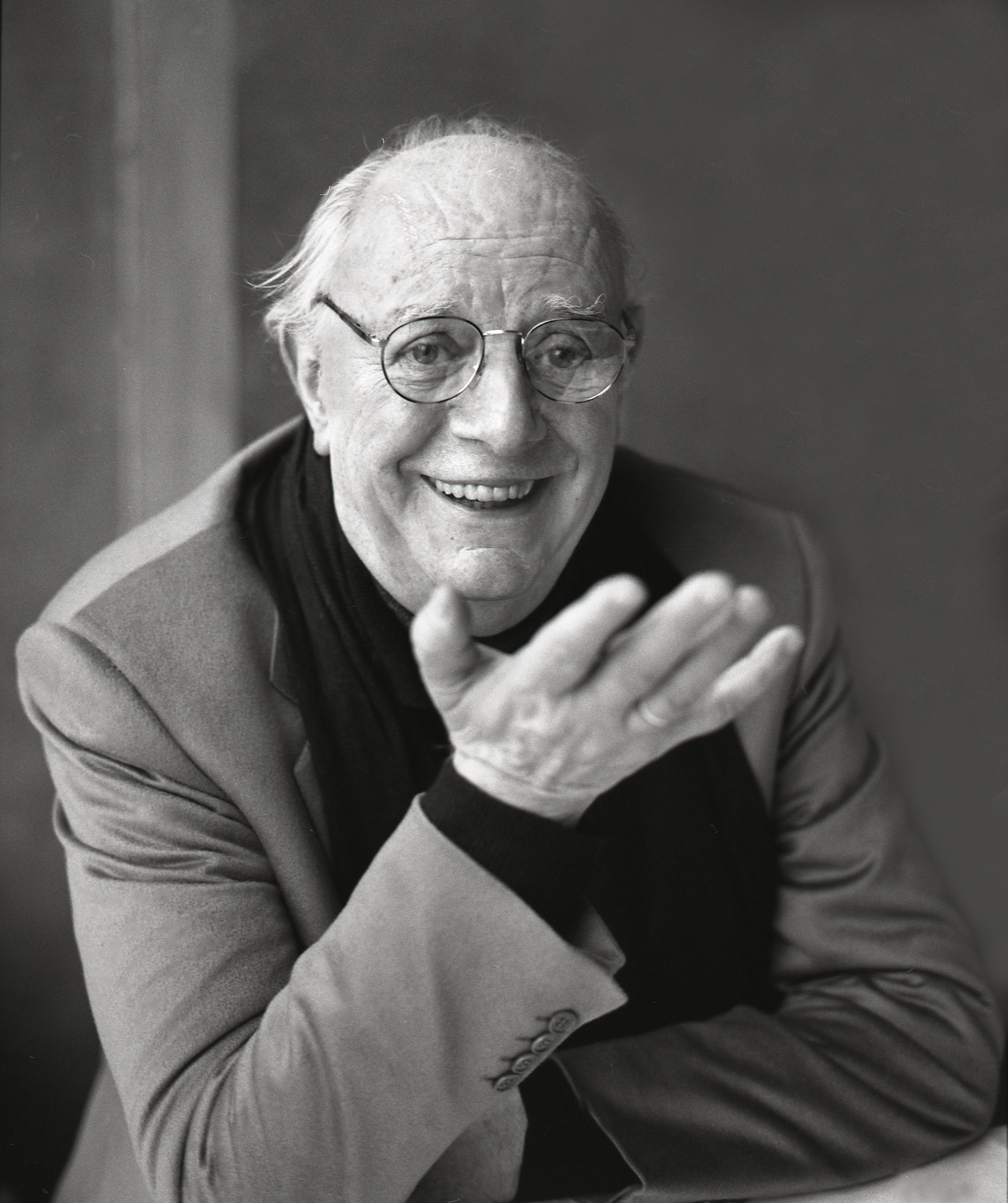
Dario Fo, one of the most widely performed playwrights in modern theatre, received international acclaim for his highly improvisational style. He was awarded the Nobel Prize for Literature in 1997.

From the 16th to 18th century, commedia dell'arte was a popular form of improvisational theatre. Traveling troupes of players would set up an outdoor stage and provide entertainment in the form of juggling, acrobatics, and humorous plays called canovaccio. Actors improvised the performance from loose scenarios called lazzi, that provided the basic situation and plot. Actors relied on a repertoire of stock characters, such as foolish old men, devious servants, or military officers full of false bravado.

Noteworthy Italian theater actors and playwrights are Jacopone da Todi, Angelo Beolco, Isabella Andreini, Carlo Goldoni, Eduardo Scarpetta, Ettore Petrolini Eleonora Duse, Eduardo De Filippo, Carmelo Bene and Giorgio Strehler.

The ballet dance genre also originated in Italy. It began during the Italian Renaissance as a form of entertainment at court weddings. At first, ballets were woven into the midst of an opera, providing the audience a moment of relief from the opera's dramatic intensity. By the 17th century, Italian ballets were performed in their entirety in between the acts of an opera, and had become a popular dance form in their own right by the 1800s.

== Cinema ==
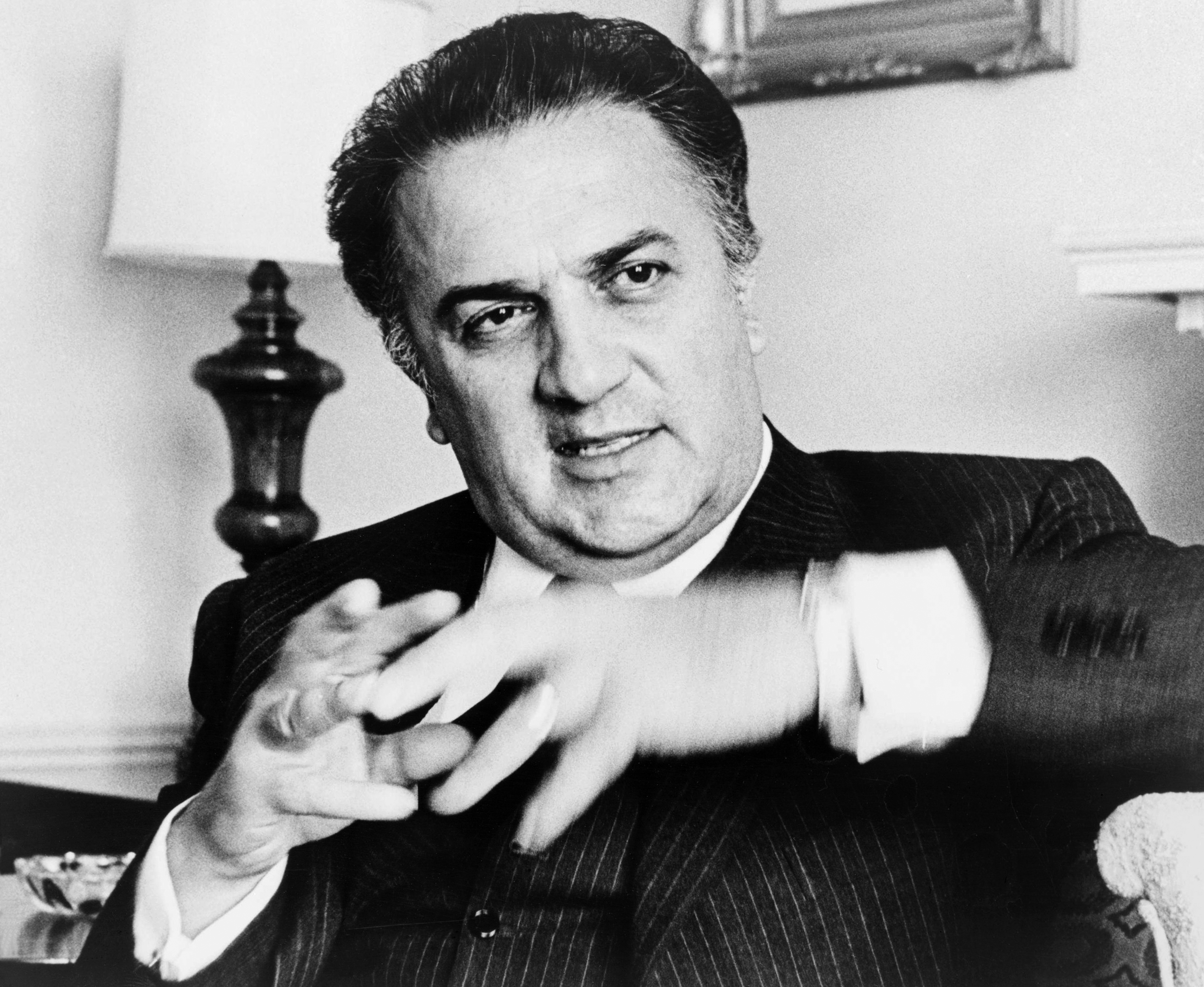
Federico Fellini, considered one of the most influential and widely revered filmmakers in the history of cinema

The history of Italian cinema began in the late 1800s, a few months after the Lumière brothers started motion picture exhibitions. The first Italian director was Vittorio Calcina, a collaborator of the Lumières, who filmed Pope Leo XIII in 1896. In the 1910s the Italian film industry developed rapidly. Cabiria, a 1914 Italian epic film directed by Giovanni Pastrone, is considered the most famous Italian silent film. It was also the first film in history to be shown in the White House. The oldest European avant-garde cinema movement, Italian futurism, took place in the late 1910s. After a period of decline in the 1920s, the Italian film industry was revitalized in the 1930s with the arrival of sound film. Popular Italian genres during this period were the Telefoni Bianchi, consisting of comedies with glamorous backgrounds, and Calligrafismo, with its artistic, highly formalistic, and expressive styling.

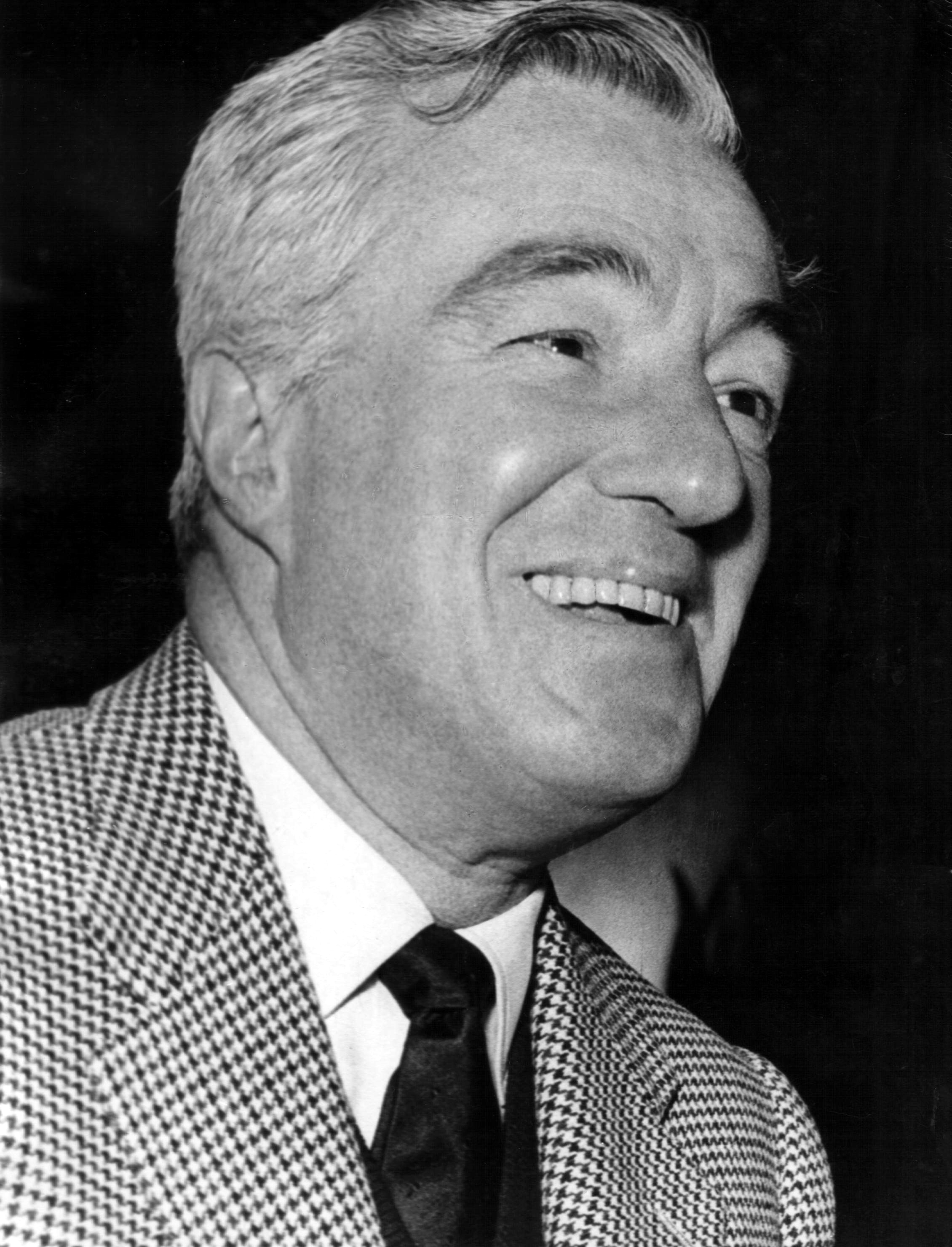
Vittorio De Sica, one of the world's most acclaimed and influential filmmakers of all time

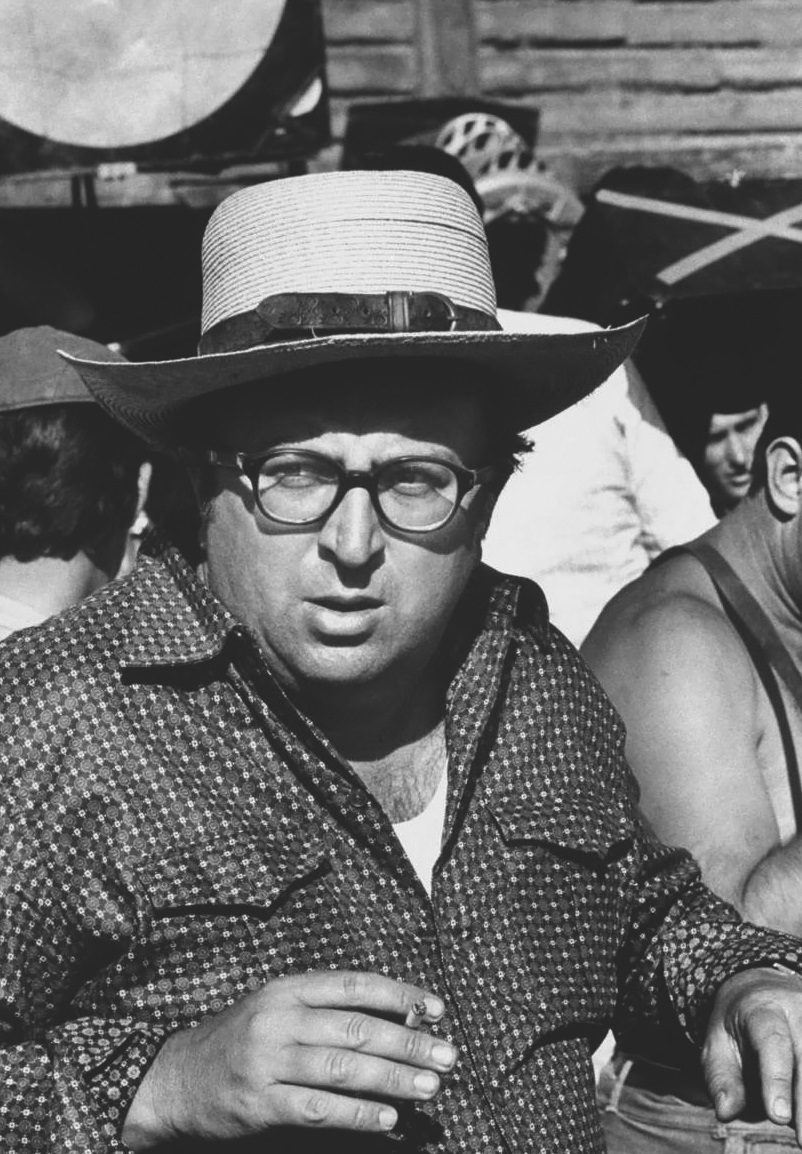
Sergio Leone, widely regarded as one of the most influential directors in the history of cinema

Italian film was widely renowned after the end of World War II. Notable Italian film directors from this period include Vittorio De Sica, Federico Fellini, Sergio Leone, Pier Paolo Pasolini, Luchino Visconti, Michelangelo Antonioni, Dussio Tessari, and Roberto Rossellini; some of these are recognised among the greatest and most influential filmmakers of all time. Movies include world cinema treasures such as Bicycle Thieves; La dolce vita; 8½; The Good, the Bad and the Ugly; and Once Upon a Time in the West. Actresses such as Sophia Loren, Giulietta Masina, and Gina Lollobrigida were popular during this period. A number of film genres were popularized by Italians during the 20th century, including Peplum, Macaroni Combat, Musicarello, Poliziotteschi, Commedia sexy all'italiana, Giallos, and the Spaghetti Western. Since the decline of Italian cinema in the 1980s, contemporary directors such as Ermanno Olmi, Bernardo Bertolucci, Giuseppe Tornatore, Gabriele Salvatores, Roberto Benigni, Matteo Garrone, Paolo Sorrentino and Luca Guadagnino brought critical acclaim back to Italian cinema.

The Venice International Film Festival, held annually since 1932, is the oldest film festival in the world and one of the "Big Three" alongside Cannes and Berlin. Italy is the most awarded country at the Academy Awards for Best Foreign Language Film, with 14 awards won, 3 Special Awards and 28 nominations. As of 2016, Italian films have won 12 Palmes d'Or (the second-most of any country), 11 Golden Lions and 7 Golden Bears.

== Science and technology ==
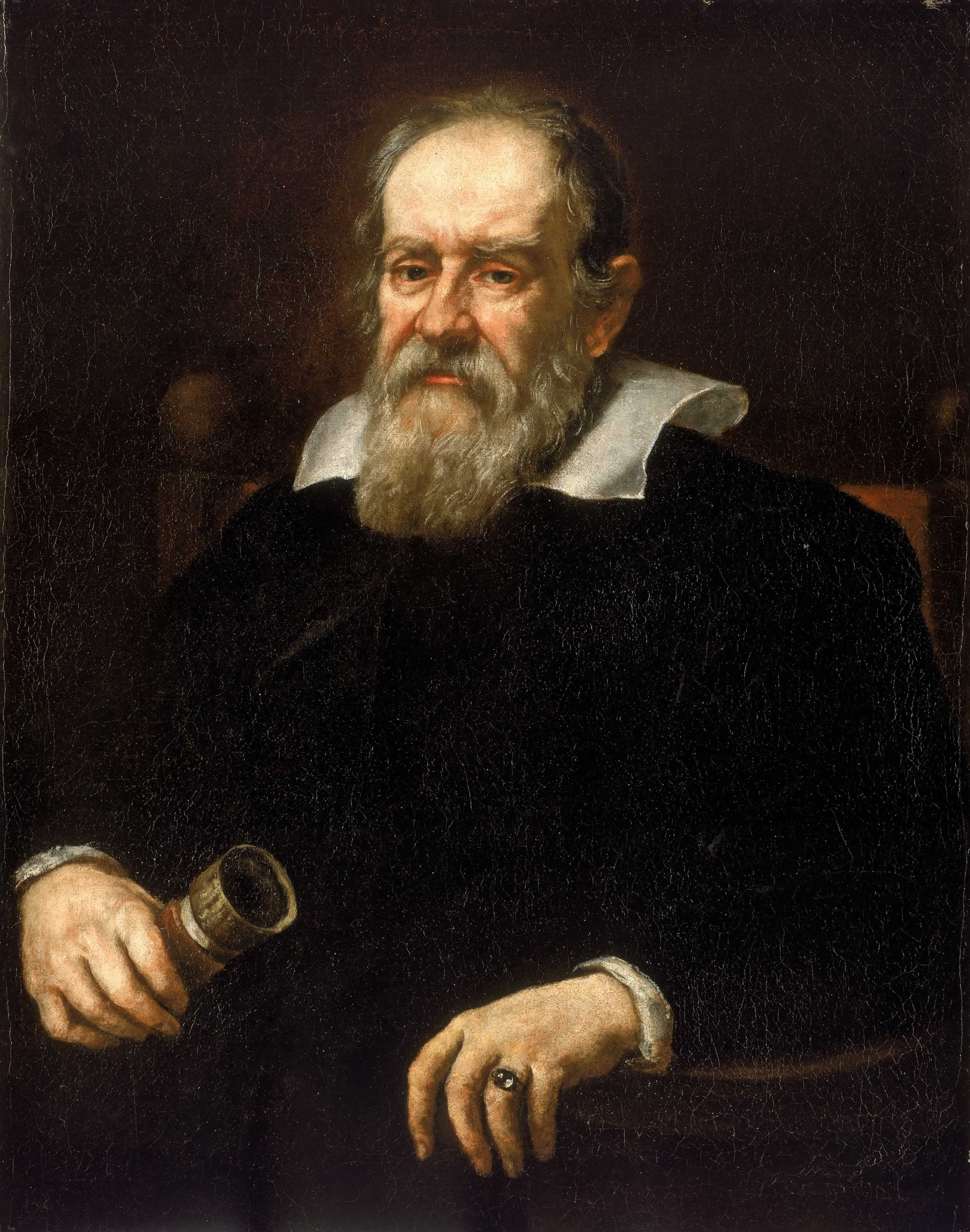
Galileo Galilei, considered the "father" of observational astronomy, modern physics, the scientific method, and modern science

Italians have contributed countless inventions and discoveries to various scientific fields. During the Renaissance, Italian polymaths such as Leonardo da Vinci, Michelangelo, and Leon Battista Alberti made important contributions to including biology, architecture, and engineering. Galileo Galilei, a physicist, mathematician, and astronomer, played a major role in the Scientific Revolution. His achievements include the invention of the thermometer and improvements to the telescope, which led to key astronomical observations and ultimately the triumph of Copernicanism over the Ptolemaic model. Other astronomers such as Giovanni Domenico Cassini and Giovanni Schiaparelli made many important discoveries about the Solar System.

Prominent Italian biologists include:

- Francesco Redi, who was the first to challenge the theory of spontaneous generation by demonstrating that maggots come from eggs of flies;
- Marcello Malpighi, who founded microscopic anatomy;
- Lazzaro Spallanzani, who conducted important research in bodily functions, animal reproduction, and cellular theory;
- Camillo Golgi, who discovered the Golgi complex named after him and advanced understanding of the neuron doctrine;
- Rita Levi-Montalcini, who discovered the nerve growth factor;
- Angelo Ruffini, who first described the Ruffini endings and was known for his work in histology and embryology;
- Filippo Pacini, who discovered the Pacinian corpuscles and was the first to isolate the cholera bacillus Vibrio cholerae in 1854, before Robert Koch's more widely accepted discoveries 30 years later.

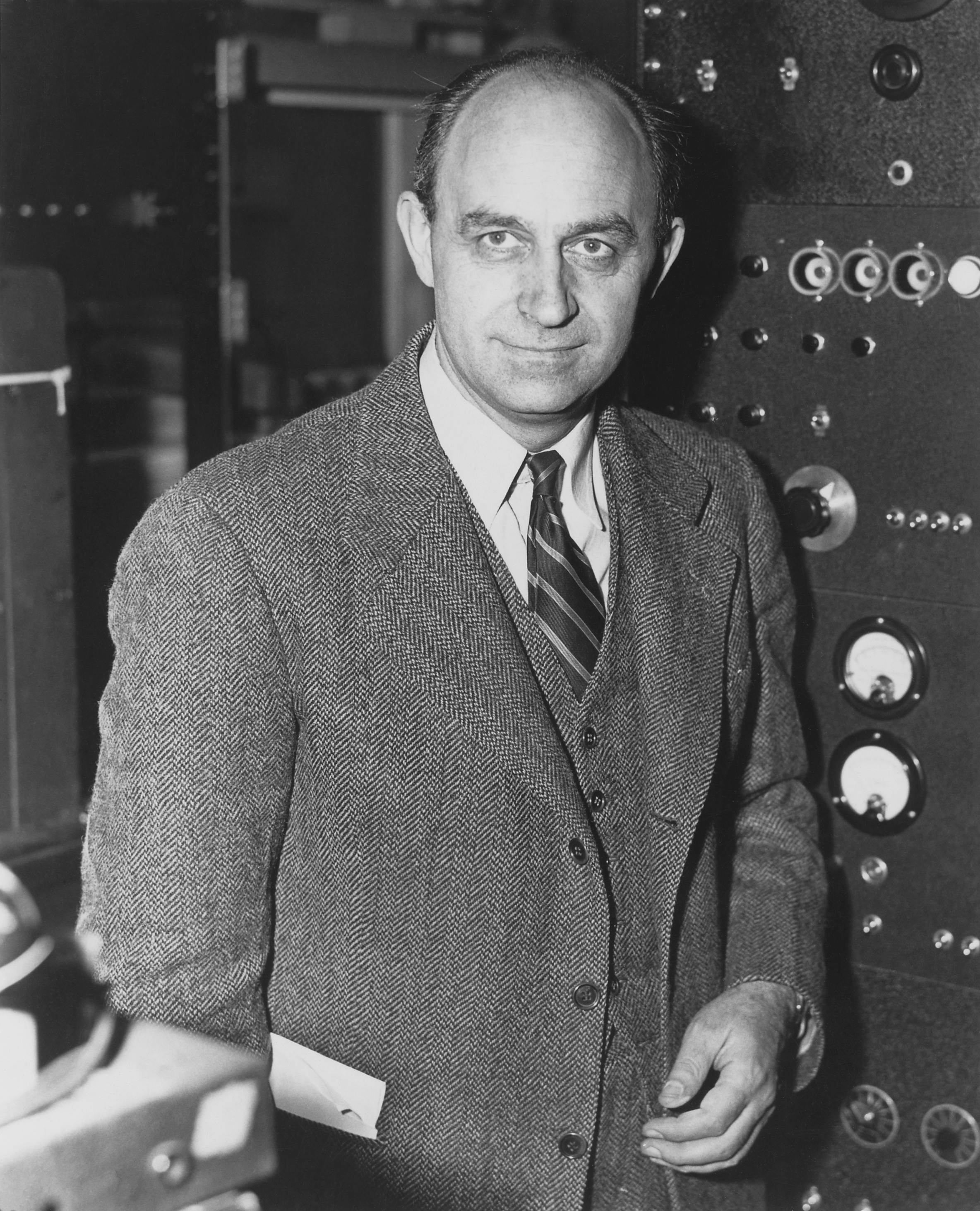
Enrico Fermi, builder of the first nuclear reactor

Prominent Italian scientists, engineers, and inventors include:

- Amedeo Avogadro, who was noted for his contributions to molecular theory, in particular Avogadro's law and the Avogadro constant;
- Evangelista Torricelli, who invented the barometer;
- Alessandro Volta, who invented the electric battery;
- Guglielmo Marconi, who invented radio;
- Antonio Meucci, who developed a voice-communication apparatus, often considered the inventor of the first telephone before even Alexander Graham Bell),
- Galileo Ferraris, who invented the first induction motor and pioneered the AC power system;
- Eugenio Barsanti and Felice Matteucci, who invented the internal combustion engine in 1853.

In chemistry, Giulio Natta, the inventor of the first catalyst for the production of isotactic propylene, received the 1963 Nobel prize for Chemistry along with Karl Ziegler, for their work on high polymers.

In physics, Enrico Fermi, a Nobel prize laureate, co-developed quantum theory and led the team in Chicago that built the first nuclear reactor. A number of Italian physicists were forced to leave Italy in the 1930s by Fascist laws against Jews, including Fermi, Emilio G. Segrè (who discovered the elements technetium and astatine, and the antiproton), and Bruno Rossi (a pioneer in cosmic rays and X-ray astronomy). Other notable Italian physicists include:

- Ettore Majorana, who theorized the Majorana fermions;
- Giuseppe Occhialini, who received the Wolf Prize in Physics for the discovery of the pion or pi-meson decay in 1947;
- Carlo Rubbia, who received the 1984 Nobel Prize in Physics for work leading to the discovery of the W and Z particles at CERN;
- Giorgio Parisi, who received the 2021 Nobel Prize in Physics for his work on spin glasses.

== Mathematics ==
Gerolamo Cardano, one of the key figures in the foundation of probability and the earliest introducer of the binomial coefficients and the binomial theorem in the Western world

During the Middle Ages, Leonardo Fibonacci introduced the Hindu–Arabic numeral system to the Western world and invented the Fibonacci sequence. Gerolamo Cardano established the foundation of probability and introduced the binomial coefficients and the binomial theorem; he also invented several mechanical devices. During the Renaissance, Luca Pacioli introduced accounting to the world, publishing the first work on double-entry bookkeeping system. Galileo Galilei made several significant advances in mathematics. Bonaventura Cavalieri's works partially anticipated integral calculus and popularized logarithms in Italy.

Jacopo Riccati invented the Riccati equation. Maria Gaetana Agnesi, the first woman to write a mathematics handbook, become the first woman mathematics professor at a university. Gian Francesco Malfatti posed a famous geometry problem, the solution to which is now known as Malfatti circles. Paolo Ruffini is credited for his innovative work in mathematics, creating Ruffini's rule and co-creating the Abel–Ruffini theorem. Joseph-Louis Lagrange, who was one of the most influential mathematicians of his time, made essential contributions to analysis, number theory, and both classical and celestial mechanics.

Gregorio Ricci-Curbastro invented tensor calculus and absolute differential calculus, which were popularized in a work he co-wrote with Tullio Levi-Civita, and used in the development of the theory of relativity. Ricci-Curbastro also wrote meaningful works on algebra, infinitesimal analysis, and papers on the theory of real numbers. Giuseppe Peano, was a founder of mathematical logic and set theory; alongside John Venn, he drew the first Venn diagram. Beniamino Segre is one of the major contributors to algebraic geometry and one of the founders of finite geometry. Ennio De Giorgi, a Wolf Prize in Mathematics recipient in 1990, solved Bernstein's problem about minimal surfaces and the 19th Hilbert problem on the regularity of solutions of elliptic partial differential equations.+

== Nobel Prizes ==
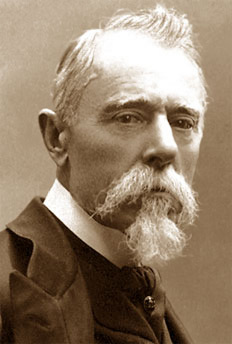
Ernesto Teodoro Moneta was awarded the Nobel Peace Prize in 1907. He adopted the motto In varietate unitas! which later inspired Motto of the European Union.

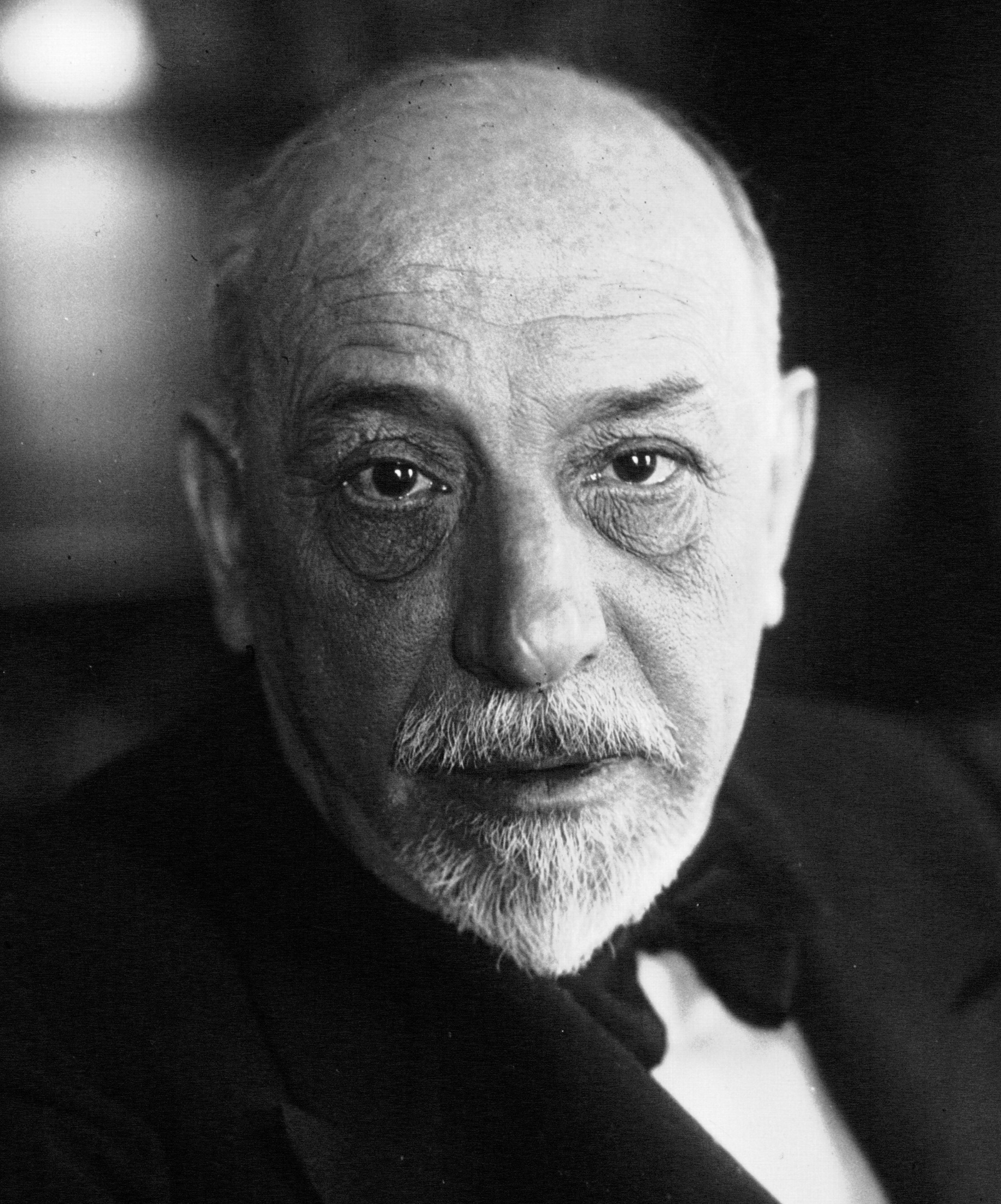
Luigi Pirandello. He was awarded the 1934 Nobel Prize in Literature. Pirandello's tragic farces are often seen as forerunners of the Theatre of the Absurd.

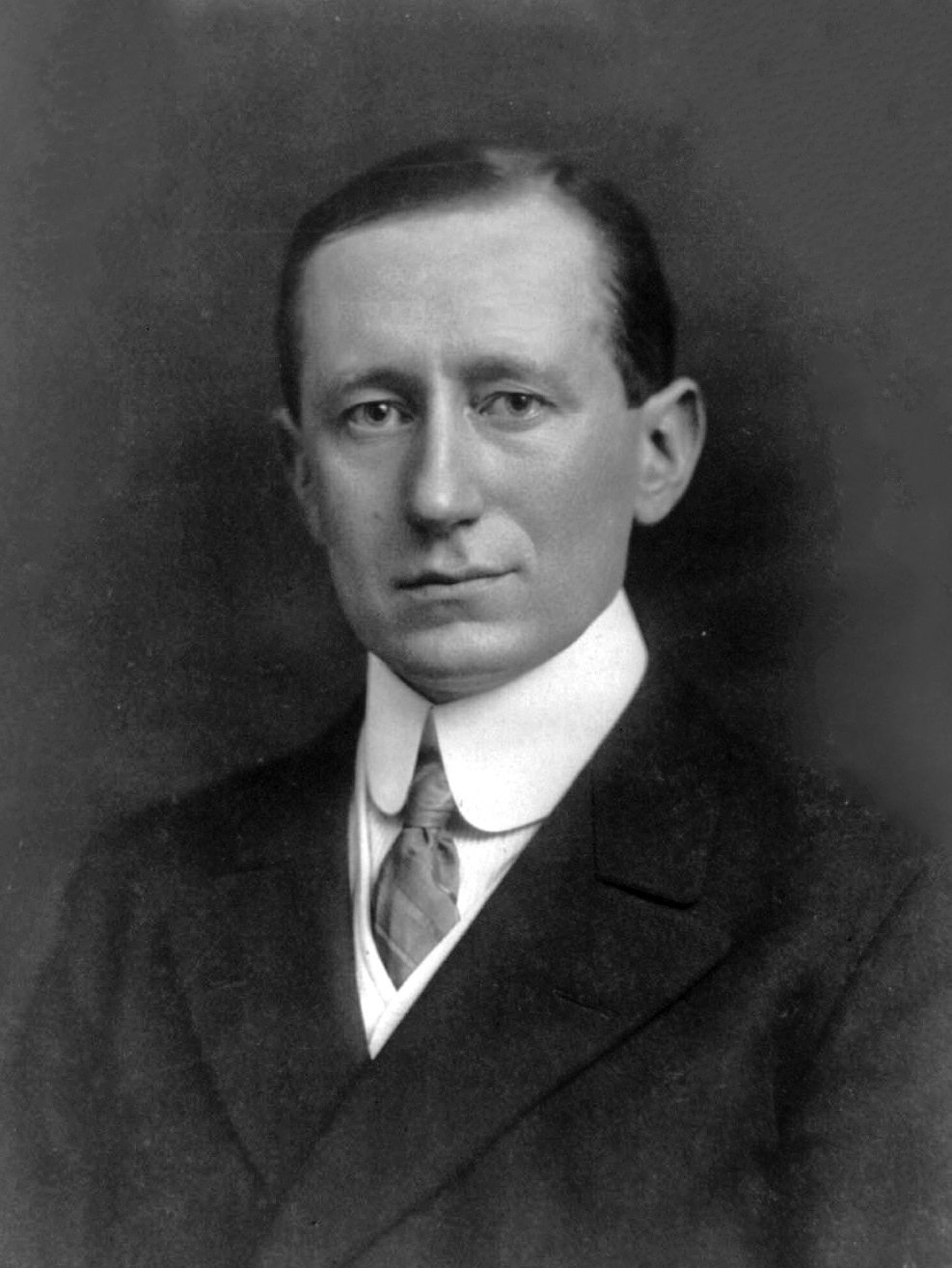
Guglielmo Marconi, inventor and electrical engineer, known for his creation of a practical radio wave-based wireless telegraph system. This led to Marconi being credited as the inventor of radio, and he won the 1909 Nobel Prize in Physics "in recognition of their contributions to the development of wireless telegraphy".

| Year | Winner | Branch | Contribution |
|---|---|---|---|
| 1906 | Giosuè Carducci | Literature | "Not only in consideration of his deep learning and critical research, but above all as a tribute to the creative energy, freshness of style, and lyrical force which characterize his poetic masterpieces". |
| 1906 | Camillo Golgi | Medicine | "In recognition of his work on the structure of the nervous system". |
| 1907 | Ernesto Teodoro Moneta | Peace | "For his work in the press and in peace meetings, both public and private, for an understanding between France and Italy". |
| 1909 | Guglielmo Marconi | Physics | "In recognition of his contributions to the development of wireless telegraphy". |
| 1926 | Grazia Deledda | Literature | "For her idealistically inspired writings which with plastic clarity picture the life on her native island and with depth and sympathy deal with human problems in general." |
| 1934 | Luigi Pirandello | Literature | "For his bold and ingenious revival of dramatic and scenic art." |
| 1938 | Enrico Fermi | Physics | "For his demonstrations of the existence of new radioactive elements produced by neutron irradiation, and for his related discovery of nuclear reactions brought about by slow neutrons." |
| 1957 | Daniel Bovet | Medicine | "For his discoveries relating to synthetic compounds that inhibit the action of certain body substances, and especially their action on the vascular system and the skeletal muscles." |
| 1959 | Salvatore Quasimodo | Literature | "For his lyrical poetry, which with classical fire expresses the tragic experience of life in our own times." |
| 1959 | Emilio Gino Segrè | Physics | "For his discovery of the anti-proton." |
| 1963 | Giulio Natta | Chemistry | "For his discoveries in the field of the chemistry and technology of high polymers." |
| 1969 | Salvatore Luria | Medicine | "For his discoveries concerning the replication mechanism and the genetic structure of viruses." |
| 1975 | Renato Dulbecco | Medicine | "For his discoveries concerning the interaction between tumour viruses and the genetic material of the cell." |
| 1975 | Eugenio Montale | Literature | "For his distinctive poetry which, with great artistic sensitivity, has interpreted human values under the sign of an outlook on life with no illusions." |
| 1984 | Carlo Rubbia | Physics | "For his decisive contributions to the large project, which led to the discovery of the field particles W and Z, communicators of weak interaction." |
| 1985 | Franco Modigliani | Economics | "For his pioneering analyses of saving and of financial markets". |
| 1986 | Rita Levi-Montalcini | Medicine | "For his discoveries in growth factors." |
| 1997 | Dario Fo | Literature | "Who emulates the jesters of the Middle Ages in scourging authority and upholding the dignity of the downtrodden." |
| 2002 | Riccardo Giacconi | Physics | "For pioneering contributions to astrophysics, which have led to the discovery of cosmic X-ray sources." |
| 2007 | Mario Capecchi | Medicine | "For his discoveries of principles for introducing specific gene modifications in mice by the use of embryonic stem cells." |
| 2021 | Giorgio Parisi | Physics | "For the discovery of the interplay of disorder and fluctuations in physical systems from atomic to planetary scales." |

== Architecture ==
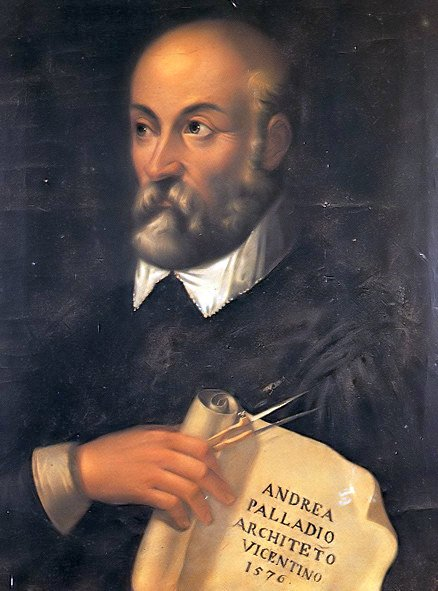
Andrea Palladio, one of the most influential individuals in the history of architecture

Italy is home to the greatest number of UNESCO World Heritage Sites (61 total) and half of the world's great art treasures. Italians are known for their significant architectural achievements, such as the construction of arches, domes, and similar structures during ancient Rome; the Renaissance architectural movement in the late-14th to 16th centuries; and Palladianism, a style of construction that inspired the later Neoclassical architecture and Italianate architecture movements.

During the Fascist period, the Novecento movement flourished, with figures such as Gio Ponti, Pietro Aschieri, and Giovanni Muzio. Fascist architecture (exemplified in the EUR buildings) was followed by the Neo-liberty style, seen in earlier works of Vittorio Gregotti, and Brutalist architecture, seen in the works of Leonardo Savioli and Giancarlo De Carlo.

== Cuisine ==
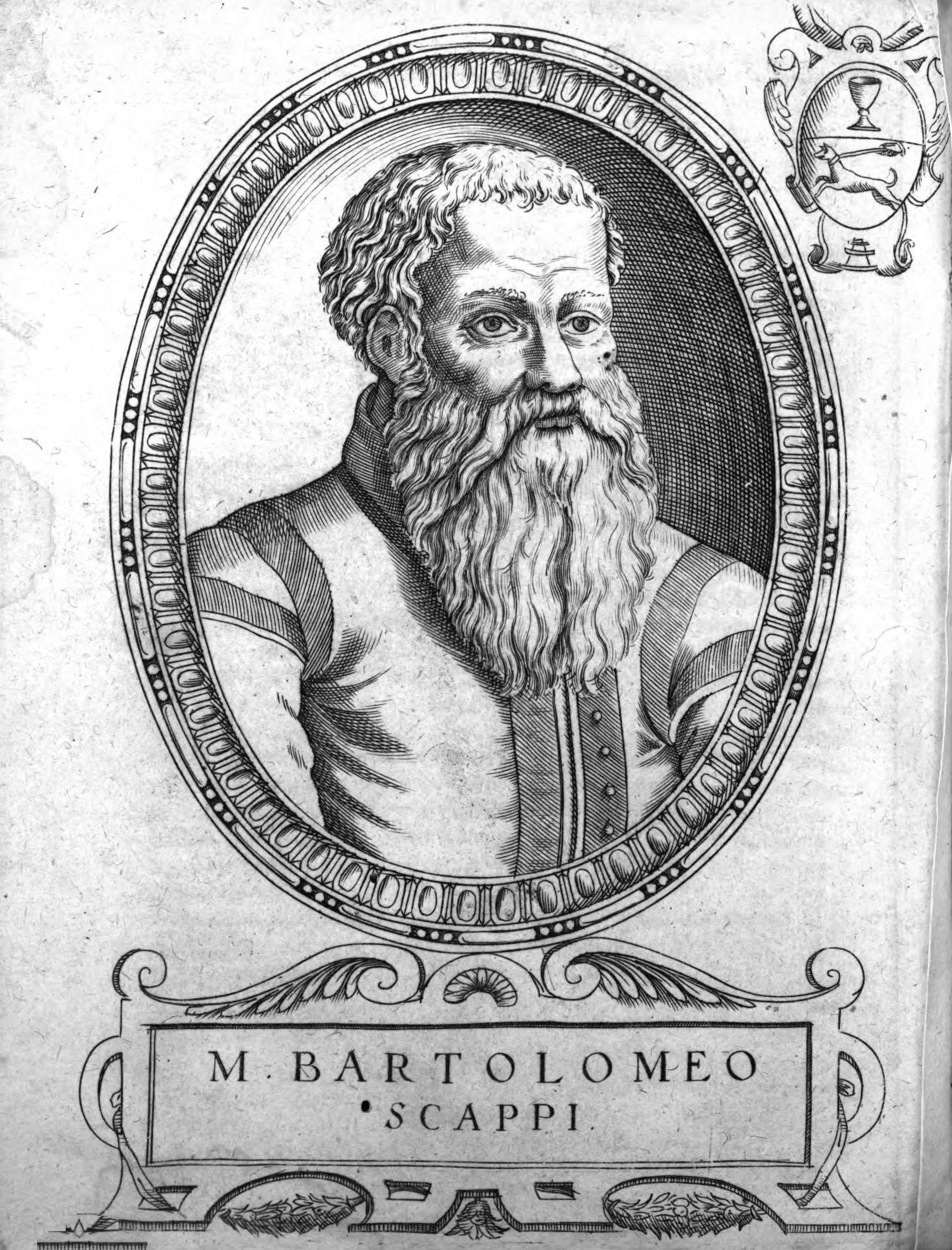
Bartolomeo Scappi

Italian cuisine is a Mediterranean cuisine consisting of the ingredients, recipes, and cooking techniques developed across the Italian Peninsula since antiquity, and later spread around the world together with waves of Italian diaspora. Italian cuisine includes deeply rooted traditions common to the whole country, as well as regional cuisines which are in continuous exchange.

One of the main characteristics of Italian cuisine is its simplicity, with many dishes made up of few ingredients, and therefore Italian cooks often rely on the quality of the ingredients, rather than the complexity of preparation. The most popular dishes and recipes, over the centuries, have often been created by ordinary people moreso than by chefs, which is why many Italian recipes are suitable for home and daily cooking.

Noteworthy Italian chefs include Bartolomeo Scappi, Gualtiero Marchesi, Lidia Bastianich, Antonio Carluccio, Cesare Casella, Carlo Cracco, Antonino Cannavacciuolo, Gino D'Acampo, Gianfranco Chiarini, Massimiliano Alajmo, Massimo Bottura and Bruno Barbieri.

== Fashion and design ==
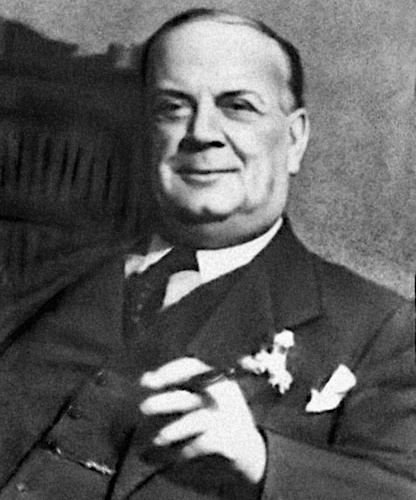
Guccio Gucci

=== Italian fashion ===
Milan, Florence, and Rome are Italy's main fashion capitals. Although most of the oldest Italian couturiers are based in Rome, Milan is seen as the fashion capital of Italy because many well-known designers are based there and it is the venue for the Italian designer collections. Major Italian fashion labels, such as Gucci, Armani, Prada, Versace, Curiel, Valentino, Dolce & Gabbana, Missoni, Fendi, Moschino, Max Mara, Trussardi, Benetton, and Ferragamo, to name a few, are regarded among the finest fashion houses in the world. Accessory and jewelry labels, such as Bulgari, Luxottica, and Buccellati were founded in Italy and are internationally acclaimed. The fashion magazine Vogue Italia is considered one of the most prestigious fashion magazines in the world.

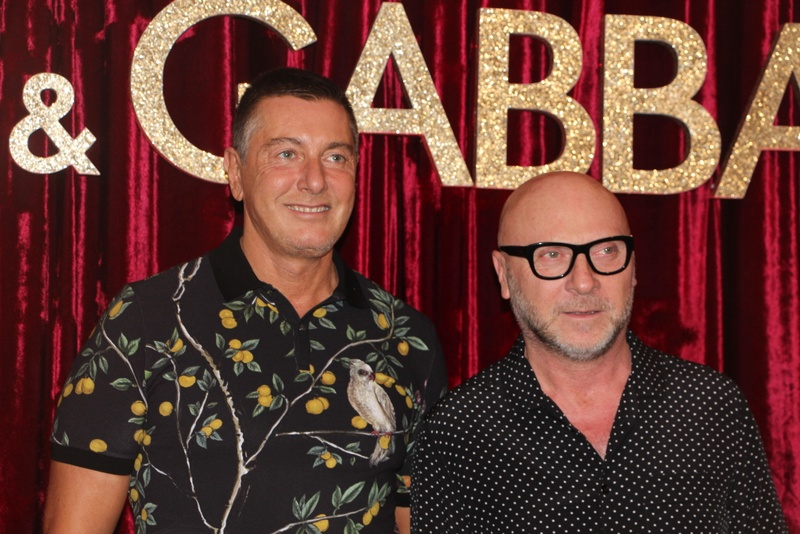
Stefano Gabbana (left) and Domenico Dolce (right)

Notable Italian fashion designers include Guccio Gucci, Salvatore Ferragamo, Giorgio Armani, Gianni Versace, Valentino, Ottavio Missoni, Nicola Trussardi, Mariuccia Mandelli, Rocco Barocco, Roberto Cavalli, Renato Balestra, Laura Biagiotti, Stefano Gabbana and Domenico Dolce.

=== Italian design ===
Italy is also prominent in the field of design, notably in interior design, architectural design, industrial design, and urban design. The country has produced some well-known furniture designers, such as Gio Ponti and Ettore Sottsass, and Italian phrases such as Bel Disegno and Linea Italiana have entered the vocabulary of furniture design. Examples of classic pieces of Italian white goods and pieces of furniture include Zanussi's washing machines and fridges, the "New Tone" sofas by Atrium, and the post-modern bookcase by Ettore Sottsass, inspired by Bob Dylan's song "Stuck Inside of Mobile with the Memphis Blues Again". Milan and Turin are the nation's leaders in architectural design and industrial design. Milan hosts the FieraMilano, Europe's biggest design fair, the Fuori Salone, and the Salone del Mobile, and has been home to the designers Bruno Munari, Lucio Fontana, Enrico Castellani, and Piero Manzoni.

== Sport ==
663 Italian athletes have won medals at the Olympic games – 549 medals at the Summer Olympics and 114 medals at the Winter Olympics – which makes them the 6th most successful ethnic group in Olympic history. Italy consistently performs well in swordsmanship events and skiing, thanks to the presence of the Alps and the Apennines in Northern and Central Italy.

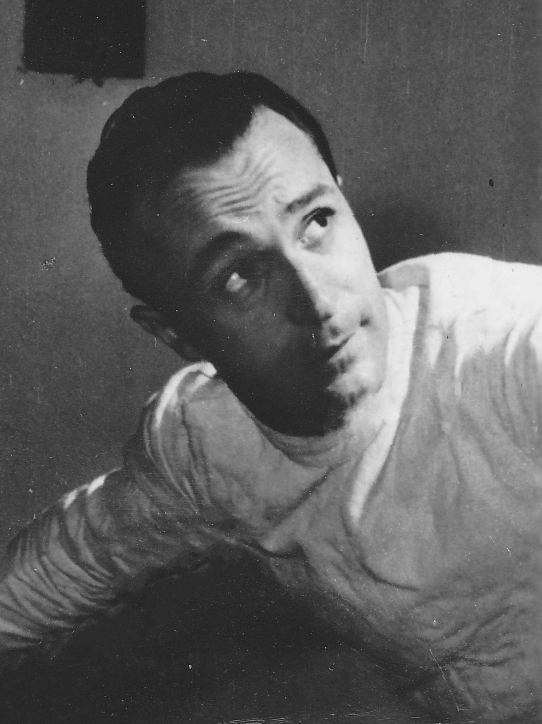
Edoardo Mangiarotti, the world's most successful fencer

Italy is one of the most successful national teams in association football, having won four FIFA World Cups, two UEFA European Championship, and one Olympic tournament. FIFA World Cup winners include Giuseppe Meazza, Silvio Piola (to date the highest goalscorer in Italian first league history), Dino Zoff, Paolo Rossi, Marco Tardelli, Bruno Conti, Gianluigi Buffon, Fabio Cannavaro, Alessandro Del Piero, Andrea Pirlo, and Francesco Totti. European champions include Gianni Rivera, Luigi Riva (to date Italy's leading scorer of all time), Sandro Salvadore, Giacomo Bulgarelli, Pietro Anastasi, and Giacinto Facchetti. At the club level, Italy has won a total of 12 European Cup / Champions' Leagues, 9 UEFA Cups / UEFA Europa League, and 7 UEFA Cup Winners' Cup. Prominent players who achieved success at club level include Giampiero Boniperti, Romeo Benetti, Roberto Boninsegna, Roberto Bettega, Roberto Baggio and Paolo Maldini.

Italians have won more World Cycling Championships than any other country except for Belgium. The Giro d'Italia is a world-famous long-distance cycling race held every May, and constitutes one of the three Grand Tours, along with the Tour de France and the Vuelta a España.

Italian professional tennis players are almost always in the top 100 world ranking of male and female players. Beach tennis with paddle racquet was invented by Italians, and is practised by many people across the country.

The Italian national basketball team's best results were gold at Eurobasket 1983 and EuroBasket 1999, as well as silver at the Olympics in 2004. Lega Basket Serie A is widely considered one of the most competitive in Europe.

The Italian Volleyball League is regarded as the most difficult volleyball league in the world. The male and female national teams often rank in the top 4 teams in the world.

Rugby union was imported from France in the 1910s and has been regularly played since the 1920s. By the 1990s, when the Italian national team managed to beat historically dominant teams like Scotland, Ireland, and France, Italy gained admission to the Five Nation Championship, which had to be renamed Six Nations as a result. Italy has taken part in the Rugby World Cup since its inauguration in 1987 and never missed an edition, although to date it has never progressed past the group stage.

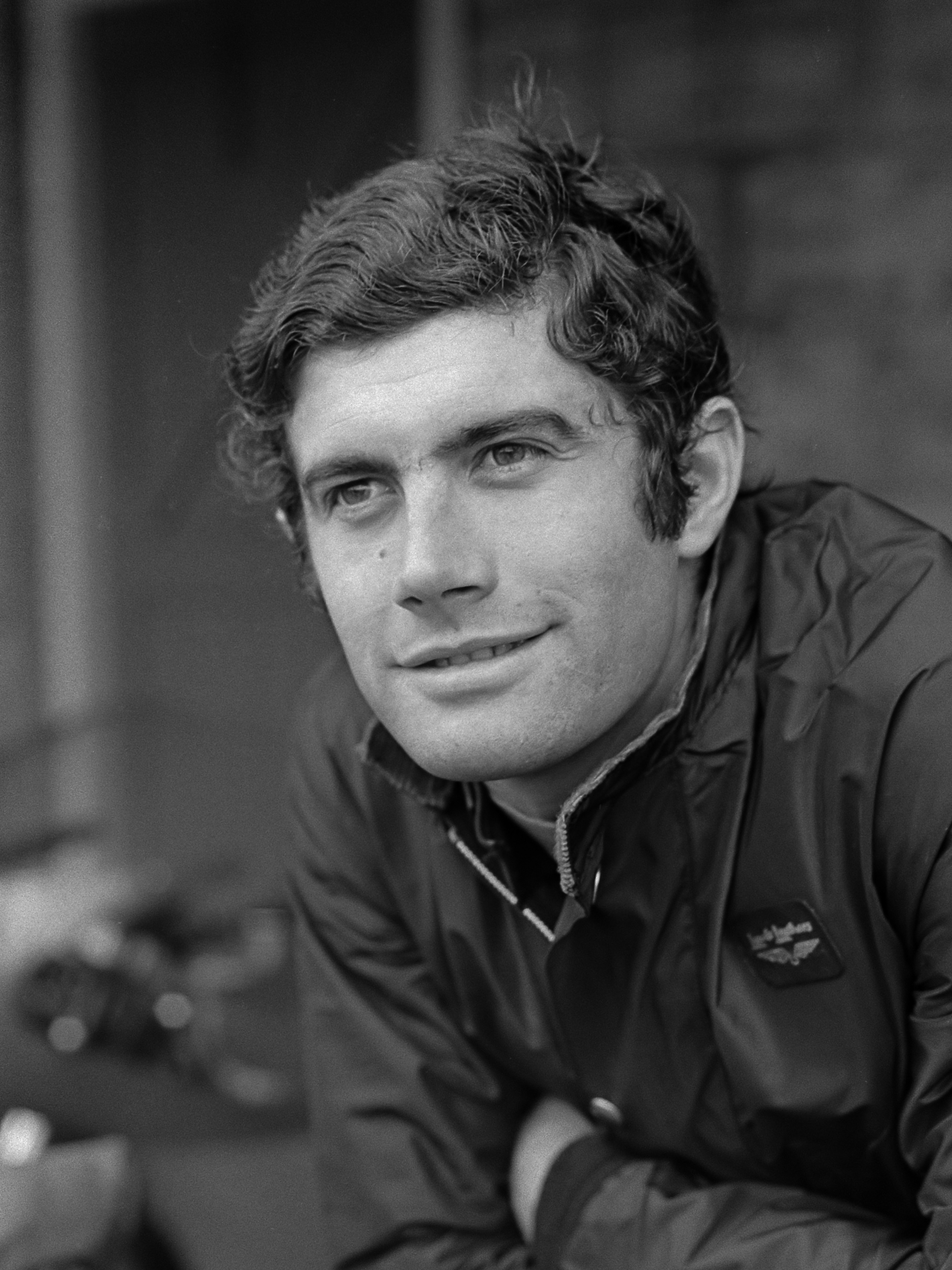
Giacomo Agostini, the most successful motorcyclist in the history of the World Championship

Some other notable Italian athletes include:

- Motorcycle racers such as Giacomo Agostini and Valentino Rossi;
- Federica Pellegrini, one of the few female swimmers to have set world records in more than one event;
- Jessica Rossi, who scored a Shooting sport world record of 99;
- Bruno Sammartino, a wrestler who held the WWWF World Heavyweight Championship for over 11 years across two reigns, the first of which was the longest single reign in the promotion's history

== Women ==
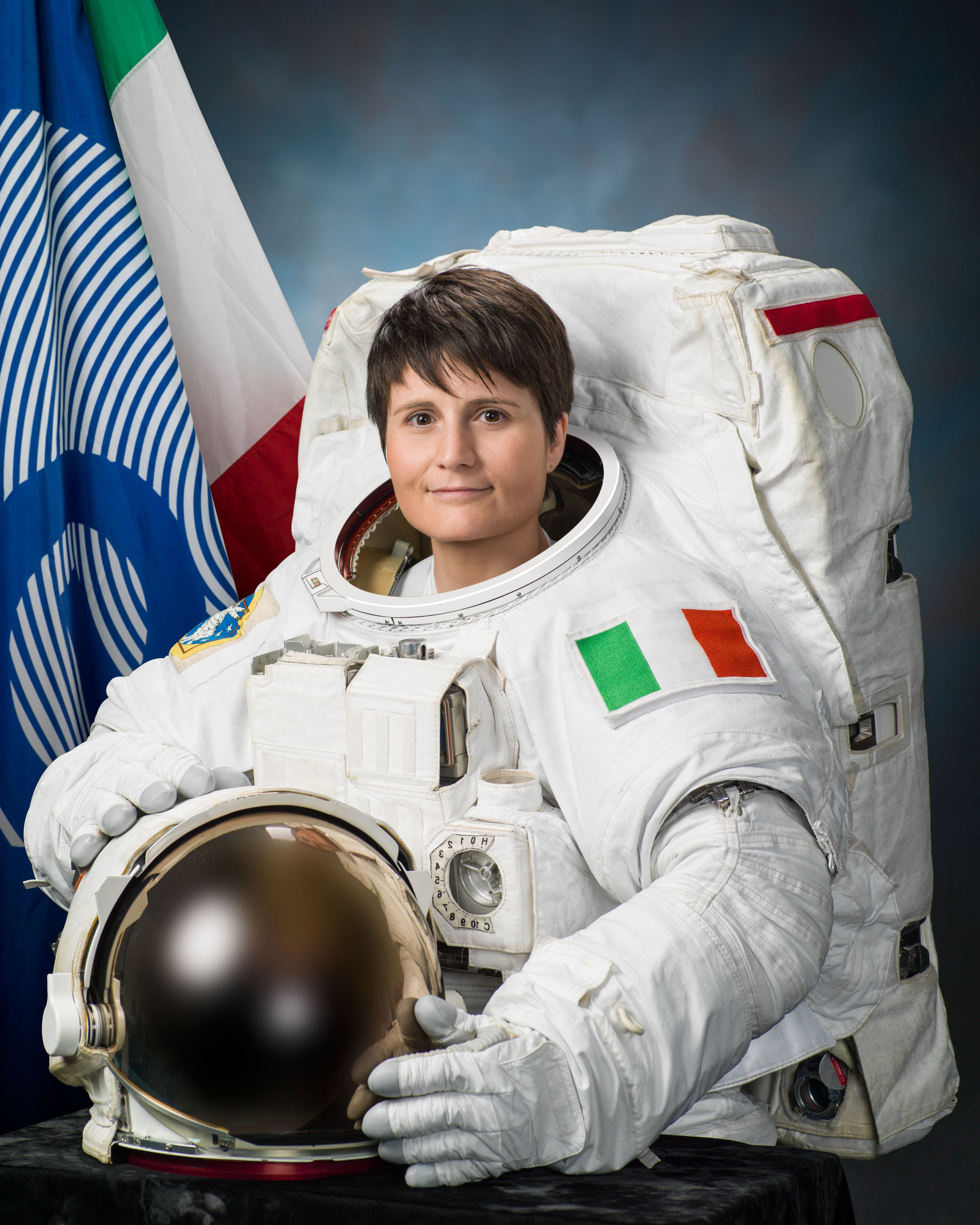
Samantha Cristoforetti

Famous women from Italy include actresses Anna Magnani, Sofia Loren, and Gina Lollobrigida; soprano Renata Tebaldi; ballet dancer Carla Fracci; costume designer Milena Canonero; athletes Sara Simeoni, Deborah Compagnoni, Valentina Vezzali, and Federica Pellegrini; writers Elsa Morante, Alda Merini, and Oriana Fallaci; architect Gae Aulenti; astrophysicist Margherita Hack; astronaut Samantha Cristoforetti; pharmacologist Elena Cattaneo; CERN Director-General Fabiola Gianotti; and politicians Nilde Iotti, Tina Anselmi, Emma Bonino, and Giorgia Meloni, the first female Prime Minister of Italy.

== See also ==
- Demographics of Italy
- Sicilians
- Sardinians
- Sammarinese
- Ladins
- List of people from Italy
- List of people from Sardinia
- List of people from Sicily

== Bibliography ==
- Baretti, Joseph (1768). An account of the manners and customs of Italy. London: T. Davies.
- Lyman, Theodore (1820). The political state of Italy. Boston: Wells and Lilly.
- Leopardi, Giacomo (1824). Discorso sopra lo stato presente dei costumi degl'italiani (in Italian). Venice: Marsilio Editore. ISBN 978-88-317-5196-4.
- Micali, Giuseppe (1832). Storia degli antichi popoli italiani (in Italian). Florence: Tipografia Dante.
- Prezzolini, Giuseppe (1921). Codice della vita italiana (in Italian). Florence: La Voce. ISBN 978-88-7371-022-6.
- Devoto, Giacomo (1951). Gli antichi italici (in Italian). Florence: Vallecchi.
- Bollati, Giulio (1996). L'italiano: il carattere nazionale come storia e come invenzione (in Italian). Turin: Einaudi. ISBN 978-88-06-14264-3.
