= Sicilians =

Romance ethnic group

Sicilians Siciliani
- Flag of Sicily

- Sicilian men in traditional attire

Regions with significant populations
- Sicily 4,833,329 (inhabitants of Sicily)
- Diaspora
- Germany: 199,546
- Belgium: 89,581
- United States: 85,175 (2000, incl. ancestry)
- Switzerland: 64,456
- Argentina: 61,621
- France: 60,520

Languages
- Native; Sicilian; Primarily; Italian

Religion
- Predominantly Roman Catholicism (Latin and Byzantine Rite); Minority Greek Orthodox, Judaism, Irreligion

Related ethnic groups
- Other Italians, Sicilian diaspora, Greeks, Maltese, Normans, Calabrians, Arbëreshë, Other Southern Europeans

Sicilians (Sicilian: Siciliani) are a Romance ethnic group native to Sicily, the largest island in the Mediterranean, as well as the largest and most populous of the autonomous regions of Italy. They share a common ancestry, culture, history and speak the Sicilian language alongside Italian.

== Etymology ==
The name Sicilia was given to the Roman province in 241 BC. It is named after the Sicels, who inhabited the eastern part of the island during the Iron Age. The ancient name of the island is Trinacria (Greek Τρινακρία "having three headlands") for its triangular shape, likely a re-interpretation of earlier (Homeric) Thrinacia. The Greek name was rendered as Trīnācrĭa in classical Latin (Virgil, Ovid).

== History ==
The Sicilian people are indigenous to the island of Sicily, which was first populated beginning in the Paleolithic and Neolithic periods. According to the famous Italian historian Carlo Denina, the origin of the first inhabitants of Sicily is no less obscure than that of the first Italians; however, there is no doubt that a large part of these early individuals traveled to Sicily from Southern Italy—others from the Islands of Greece, and the coasts of Iberia and Western Europe.

=== Prehistory ===
The aboriginal inhabitants of Sicily, long absorbed into the population, were tribes known to the ancient Greek writers as the Elymians, the Sicanians, and the Sicels, the last being an Indo-European-speaking people of possible Italic affiliation, who migrated from the Italian mainland (likely from the Amalfi Coast or Calabria via the Strait of Messina) during the second millennium BC, after whom the island was named. The Elymian tribes have been speculated to be a Indo-European people who migrated to Sicily from either Troy, Liguria, Calabria, or one of the Aegean Islands, or perhaps were a collection of native migratory maritime-based tribes from all previously mentioned regions, and formed a common "Elymian" tribal identity/basis after settling down in Sicily. When the Elymians migrated to Sicily is unknown, however scholars of antiquity considered them to be the second oldest inhabitants, while the Sicanians, thought to be the oldest inhabitants of Sicily by scholars of antiquity, were speculated to also be a pre-Indo-European tribe, who migrated via boat from the Xúquer river basin in Castellón, Cuenca, Valencia and Alicante. Before the Sicanians lived in the easternmost part of the Iberian peninsula. The name 'Sicanus' has been asserted to have a possible link to the modern river known in Valencian as the Xúquer and in Castilian as the Júcar. The Beaker was introduced in Sicily from Sardinia and spread mainly in the north-west and south-west of the island. In the northwest and in the Palermo kept almost intact its cultural and social characteristics, while in the south-west there was a strong integration with local cultures. The only known single bell-shaped glass in eastern Sicily was found in Syracuse.

Map of the most important archaeological sites of Sicily related to pre-hellenic cultures

All three tribes lived both a sedentary pastoral and orchard farming lifestyle, and a semi-nomadic fishing, transhumance and mixed farming lifestyle. Prior to the Neolithic Revolution, Paleolithic Sicilians would have lived a hunter-gatherer lifestyle, just like most human cultures before the Neolithic. The river Salsu was the territorial boundary between the Sicels and Sicanians. They wore basic clothing made of wool, plant fibre, papyrus, esparto grass, animal skins, palm leaves, leather and fur, and created everyday tools, as well as weapons, using metal forging, woodworking and pottery. They typically lived in a nuclear family unit, with some extended family members as well, usually within a drystone hut, a neolithic long house or a simple hut made of mud, stones, wood, palm leaves or grass. Their main methods of transportation were horseback, donkeys and chariots. Evidence of pet wildcats, cirneco dogs and children's toys have been discovered in archaeological digs, especially in cemetery tombs. Their diet was a typical Mediterranean diet, including unique food varieties such as Gaglioppo, Acitana and Diamante citron, while in modern times the Calabrian Salami, which is also produced in Sicily, and sometimes used to make spicy 'Nduja spreadable paste/sauce, is a popular type of salami sold in Brazil and the Anglosphere. All 3 tribes also specialised in building megalithic single-chambered dolmen tombs, a tradition which dates back to the Neolithic. "An important archaeological site, located in Southeast Sicily, is the Necropolis of Pantalica, a collection of cemeteries with rock-cut chamber tombs. Dating from the 13th to the 7th centuries BC., recent estimates suggest a figure of just under 4,000 tombs. They extend around the flanks of a large promontory located at the junction of the Anapo river with its tributary, the Calcinara, about 23 km (14 mi) northwest of Syracuse. Together with the city of Syracuse, Pantalica was listed as a UNESCO World Heritage Site in 2005. The site was mainly excavated between 1895 and 1910 by the Italian archeologist, Paolo Orsi, although most of the tombs had already been looted long before his time. Items found within the tombs of Pantalica, some now on display at the Archaeology Museum in Syracuse, were the characteristic red-burnished pottery vessels, and metal objects, including weaponry (small knives and daggers) and clothing, such as bronze fibulae (brooches) and rings, which were placed with the deceased in the tombs. Most of the tombs contained between one and seven individuals of all ages and both sexes. Many tombs were evidently re-opened periodically for more burials. The average human life span at this time was probably around 30 years of age, although the size of the prehistoric population is hard to estimate from the available data, but might have been around 1000 people."

Nuragic ceramic remains, (from Sardinia), carbon dated to the 13th century BC, have been found in Lipari. The prehistoric Thapsos culture, associated with the Sicani, shows noticeable influences from Mycenaean Greece. The type of burial found in the necropolis of the Thapsos culture, is characterized by large rock-cut chamber tombs, and often of tholos-type that some scholars believe to be of Mycenaean derivation, while others believe it to be the traditional shape of the hut. The housing are made up of mostly circular huts bounded by stone walls, mainly in small numbers. Some huts have rectangular shape, particularly the roof. The economy was based on farming, herding, hunting and fishing. There are numerous evidences of trading networks, in particular of bronze vessels and weapons of Mycenaean and Nuragic (Sardinian) production. There were close trading relationships/networks established with the Milazzo Culture of the Aeolian Islands, and with the Apennine culture of mainland southern Italy. In Sicily's earlier prehistory, there is also evidence of trade with the Capsian and Iberomaurusian mesolithic cultures from Tunisia, with some lithic stone sites attested in certain parts of the island.

Another archaeological site, originally identified by Paolo Orsi on the basis of a particular ceramic style, is the Castelluccio culture which dates back to the Ancient Bronze Age (2000 B.C. approximately), and is seen as sort of a "prehistoric proto-civilization", located between Noto and Siracusa. The discovery of a prehistoric village in Castelluccio di Noto, next to the remains of prehistoric circular huts, led to finds of Ceramic glass decorated with brown lines on a yellow-reddish background, and tri-color with the use of white. The weapons used in the days of Castelluccio culture were green stone and basalt axes and, in the most recent settlements, bronze axes, and frequently carved bones, considered idols similar to those of Malta, and of Troy II and III. Burials were made in rounded tombs carved into the rock, with doors with relief carving of spiral symbols and motifs that evoke the sexual act. The Castelluccio culture is dated to a period between 2200 BC and 1800 BC, although some believe it to be contemporary to the Middle-Late Helladic period (1800/1400 BC)." "Sites related to the Castelluccio culture were present in the villages of south-east Sicily, including Monte Casale, Cava/Quarry d'Ispica, Pachino, Niscemi, Cava/Quarry Lazzaro, near Noto, of Rosolini, in the rocky Byzantine district of coastal Santa Febronia in Palagonia, in Cuddaru d' Crastu (Tornabé-Mercato d'Arrigo) near Pietraperzia, where there are remains of a fortress partly carved in stone, and – with different ceramic forms – also near Agrigento in Monte Grande. The discovery of a cup of 'Etna type' in the area of Comiso, among local ceramic objects led to the discovery of commercial trades with the Castelluccio sites of Paternò, Adrano and Biancavilla, whose graves differ in making due to the hard basaltic terrain and also for the utilization of the lava caves as chamber tombs. In the area around Ragusa, there have been found evidences of mining among the ancient residents of Castelluccio; tunnels excavated by the use of basalt bats allowed the extraction and production of highly sought flints. Some dolmens, dated back to this same period, with sole funeral function, are found in different parts of Sicily and attributable to a people not belonging to the Castelluccio Culture."

The late prehistory of Sicily was complex and involved interactions between multiple ethnic groups. However, the impact of two influences remains clear: the Europeans coming from the north-west – for example, the peoples of Bell Beaker culture (bearers of the dolmens culture, recently discovered in this island and dating back to the Neolithic Bronze Age), and that from the eastern Mediterranean. Complex urban settlements become increasingly evident from around 1300 BC. There were three native Elymian towns by the names of Segesta, Eryx and Entella, as well as several Siculian towns called Agyrion, Kale Akte (founded by the Sicel leader Ducetius), Enna and Pantalica, and one Sicanian town known as Thapsos (Greek: Θάψος).

The Sicelian polytheistic worship of the ancient and native chthonic, animistic-cult deities associated with geysers known as the Palici, as well as the worship of the volcano-fire god by the name of Adranos, were also worshiped throughout Sicily by the Elymians and Sicanians. Their (Palici) centre of worship was originally based on three small lakes that emitted sulphurous vapors in the Palagonian plains, and as a result these twin brothers were associated with geysers and the underworld. There was also a shrine to the Palici in Palacia, where people could subject themselves or others to tests of reliability through divine judgement; passing meant that an oath could be trusted. The mythological lineage of the Palici is uncertain. According to Macrobius, the nymph Thalia gave birth to the divine twins while living underneath the Earth. They were most likely either the sons of the native fire god Adranos, or, as Polish historian "Krzysztof Tomasz Witczak" suggests, the Palici may derive from the old Proto-Indo-European mytheme of the divine twins. Mount Etna is named after the mythological Sicilian nymph called Aetna, who might have been the possible mother to the Palici twins. Mount Etna was also believed to have been the region where Zeus buried the Serpentine giant Typhon, and the humanoid giant Enceladus in classical mythology. The Cyclopes, giant one-eyed humanoid creatures in classical Greco-Roman mythology, known as the maker of Zeus' thunderbolts, were traditionally associated with Sicily and the Aeolian Islands. The Cyclopes were said to have been assistants to the Greek blacksmith God Hephaestus, at his forge in Sicily, underneath Mount Etna, or perhaps on one of the nearby Aeolian Islands. The Aeolian Islands, off the coast of Northwestern Sicily, were themselves named after the mythological king and "keeper of the heavy winds" known as Aeolus. In his Hymn to Artemis, Cyrene poet Callimachus states that the Cyclopes on the Aeolian island of Lipari, working "at the anvils of Hephaestus", make the bows and arrows used by Apollo and Artemis. The Hesiodic Latin poet Ovid names three Cyclopes "Brontes, Steropes and Acmonides" working as forgers inside Sicilian caves.

Besides Demeter (the Greek goddess of agriculture and law), and Persephone (the Greek personified goddess of vegetation), The Phoenician bull god Moloch (a significant deity also mentioned in the Hebrew Bible), the Phoenician moon goddess of fertility and prosperity Astarte (with her Roman equivalent being Venus), the Punic goddess Tanit, and the weather & war god Baal (which later evolved into the Carthaginian god Baal Hammon), as well as the Carthaginian chief god Baal Hammon, also had centres of cultic-worship throughout Sicily. The river Anapus was viewed as the personification of the river god Anapus in Greek-Sicilian mythology. The Elymians inhabited the western parts of Sicily, while the Sicanians inhabited the central parts, and the Sicels inhabited the eastern parts.

=== Ancient history ===
Ancient Greek colonies and their dialect groupings in Magna Graecia.

Beginning in the late 8th century BC, Phoenicians began to settle in western Sicily, having already started colonies on the nearby parts of North Africa and Malta. The ancient historian Thucydides (5th century BC) mentions three settlements at Soloeis (Solunto), present day Palermo and Motya (an island near present-day Marsala), He also explains that the Phoenicians originally occupied various coastal locations throughout Sicily before concentrating in the western part of the island following Greek colonisation. The Phoenicians did not carry out colonization in the traditional sense of the term; rather, they focused on controlling trade routes along the coasts. They did not promote urban development in the manner of the Greeks, who built large cities equipped with temples and theaters.

Sicily was later colonized and heavily settled by Greeks. Initially, this was restricted to the eastern and southern parts of the island. As the Greek and Phoenician communities grew more populous and more powerful, the Sicels and Sicanians were pushed further into the centre of the island. The independent Phoenician colonial settlements were eventually absorbed by Carthage during the 6th century BC. By the 3rd century BC, Syracuse was the most populous Greek city state in the world. Sicilian politics was intertwined with politics in Greece itself, leading Athens, for example, to mount the disastrous Sicilian Expedition against Syracuse in 415–413 BC during the Peloponnesian War, which ended up severely affecting a defeated Athens, both politically and economically, in the following years to come. Another battle which Syracuse took part in, this time under the Tyrant Hiero I of Syracuse, was the Battle of Cumae, where the combined navies of Syracuse and Cumae defeated an Etruscan force, resulting in significant territorial loses for the Etruscans.

By 279–278 BC, Carthage had become the dominant military power in western Sicily and was making substantial territorial gains against the Greek cities. Syracuse, meanwhile, remained the principal Greek power in the southeast, although it was politically divided and under considerable military pressure. In 278 BC, the Molossian Pyrrhus of Epirus crossed into Sicily following appeals from the Syracusan factions. In a short time, Pyrrhus secured the support of Tauromenium, Syracuse, Acragas and approximately thirty other cities. He later captured several Carthaginian possessions, including Heracleia, Eryx and Panormus, and eventually controlled virtually the entire Carthaginian territorial empire in Sicily, with the exception of Lilybaeum.

A couple years later (275 BC), Envoys from Southern Italy had notified him that of all the Greek cities in Italy, only Tarentum hadn't fallen to the Romans. Upon hearing this, coinciding with the fact that the Sicilian city-states had started becoming hostile towards him, due to him trying to force Sicily into becoming a martial state, Pyrrhus made his decision to depart from the island and dethrone himself, leaving Syracuse and Carthage in charge of the island again. As his ship left the island, he turned and, foreshadowing the Punic Wars, said to his companions: "What a wrestling ground we are leaving, my friends, for the Carthaginians and the Romans." While his army was being transported by ship to mainland Italy, Pyrrhus' navy was destroyed by the Carthaginians at the Battle of the Strait of Messina, with 98 warships sunk or disabled out of 110. After Pyrrhus of Epirus landed on Mainland Italy, his Roman opponents had mastered up a large army under Roman consul Manius Curius Dentatus, while he was still Tyrant of Sicily. After Pyrrhus was defeated at the Battle of Beneventum (275 BC) by the Romans, he decided to end his campaigns against Southern Italy, and return to Epirus, resulting in the loss of all his territorial gains in Italy. The city of Tarentum however still remained under Epirote control.

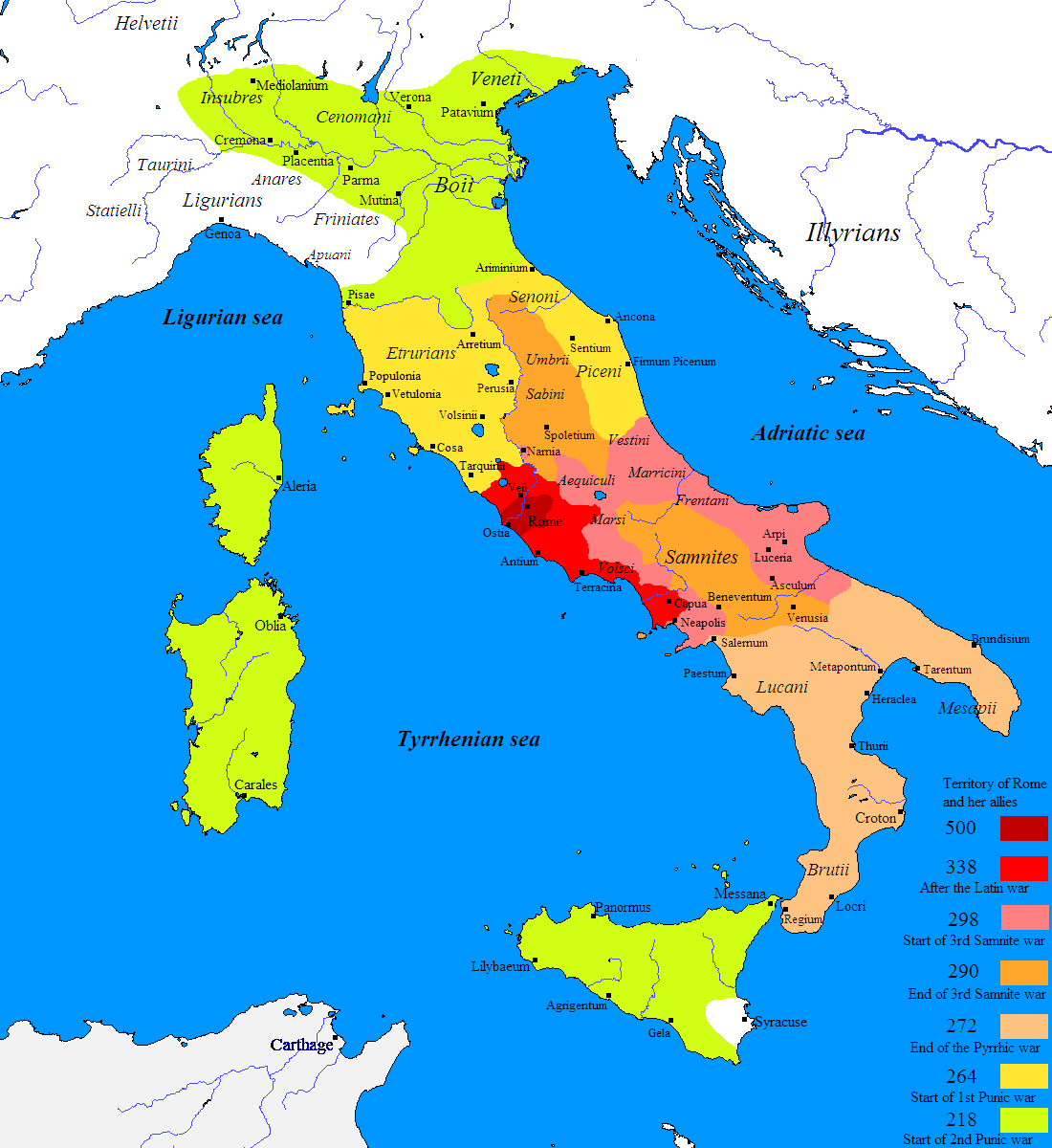
Roman expansion in Italy from 500 BC to 218 BC

The constant warfare between Ancient Carthage and the Greek city-states eventually opened the door to an emerging third power. In the 3rd century BC, the Messanan Crisis, caused by Mamertine mercenaries from Campania, when the city-states of Messina (Carthaginian-owned) and Syracuse (Dorian-owned) were being constantly raided and pillaged by Mamertines, motivated the intervention of the Roman Republic into Sicilian affairs, and led to the First Punic War between Rome and Carthage. By the end of the war in 242 BC, and with the death of Hiero II, all of Sicily except Syracuse was in Roman hands, becoming Rome's first province outside of the Italian peninsula. During the Second Punic War, after a prolonged resistance, the Roman legions entered Syracuse in 212 BC. All of the city's wealth, accumulated over centuries of hegemony and prosperity, was looted and transported to Rome. This marked a significant turning point in Mediterranean culture. However, despite losing its autonomy, Syracusae remained the main center of the island during the entire Roman era. The Syracusan province was established, and the city was designated the capital of Roman Sicily. Cicero, arriving in the 1st century BC, described it as "the most beautiful and largest Greek city" (In Verrem, II, 4, 117). Emperor Augustus established a number of six coloniae for Roman veterans on the island: Syracuse, Tauromenium, Panormus, Catania, Tyndaris, and Thermae Himerenses. Large areas of farmland, especially on the eastern and northern coasts, were given to Italian veterans as well. The influx of Italic population represented by these foundations played a decisive role in the diffusion of Latin language in Sicily. For the next 600 years, Sicily would be a province of the Roman Republic and later Empire.

The ancient historian Diodorus Siculus who wrote and recorded the monumental universal history Bibliotheca historica, and the ancient Doric-Greek revolutionary scientist, inventor and mathematician Archimedes who anticipated modern calculus, and analysis by applying methods of infinitesimals and exhaustion to rigorously derive and prove the range of geometric theorems, and invented the innovative Archimedean screw, compound pulleys, and defensive war machines to protect his native town of Syracuse from invasions, were both born, grew up in, lived and died in Sicily.

=== Vandals, Ostrogoths and Byzantines ===
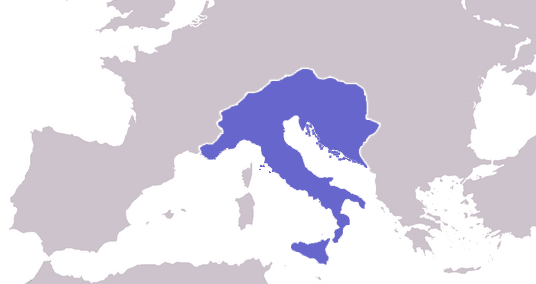
Ostrogothic Kingdom of Italy

As the Roman Empire was falling apart, a Germanic tribe known as the Vandals along with a Scythian tribe originating from the European Steppe known as the Alans took over Sicily for a relatively brief period beginning in 440 AD under the rule of their king Geiseric, forming the Kingdom of the Vandals. The Vandals and Alans gained a monopoly on the Mediterranean grain trade during their monarchical reign, with all grain taxes being monitored by them. In spite of the Western Roman Empire being preoccupied with maintaining control in Gaul, when the Vandals & Alans started invading Sicily in 440 they were defeated. Sicily remained part of the Empire until 469. Eastern Roman Emperor Theodosius II sent expeditionary forces to deal with them in 442 and 468 which ended in a Roman defeats. The Vandals took the island but lost it in 477 except for one toehold in Lilybaeum to Odoacer (an Arian Christian Barbarian statesman & general of possible East Germanic & Hunnic descent, and client king under Zeno whose reign over Italy marked the Fall of the Western Roman Empire) in 476 and completely to the Ostrogothic conquest of Sicily by Theodoric the Great which began in 488; although the Goths were Germanic, Theodoric sought to revive Roman culture and government and allowed freedom of religion. Sicily continued as a distinct province with an appointed governor under Germanic control. The Gothic War took place between the Ostrogoths and the Byzantine Empire (with its capital-city based at Constantinople, modern Istanbul), and during the reign of Justinian I, Sicily was brought back under Greco-Roman rule under the military expeditions of Byzantine generals Flavius Belisarius and Narses, resulting in Byzantine-Greek language and religion being embraced by the majority of the population. It was Syracuse where the Byzantine Emperor Constans II desired to move his capital in 663 AD, a decision which eventually led to his assassination. Sicily remained under autonomous stable Byzantine rule as the Theme/Province of Sicily (Theme (Byzantine district)) for several peaceful centuries, until an invasion by Arab Muslims (Aghlabids from the Banu Tamim Clan) in the 9th century.

Besides Sicily, the Theme or province of Sicily also included the adjacent region of Calabria in Mainland Italy. The capital city of Byzantine Sicily was Syracuse. The province was looked after by the imperial governor known as a Praetor, and was militarily protected under a general by the title of Dux. Sicily itself was divided into many districts known as a Turma. The Byzantine Exarch of Ravennan Italy named Theophylact, between 702 and 709, originally came from Sicily. After he got promoted into the Exarchate, Theophylact marched from Sicily to Rome for unknown reasons, a decision which angered the local Roman soldiers living there, however the newly elected Pope John VI, was able to calm them down. While Theophylact was still Exarch, Byzantine Emperor Justinian II seized all the leading citizens and officials of Ravenna at a local banquet, and dragged them abroad a ship to Constantinople. He sentenced all but one of the Ravennan captives to death, the exception being Archbishop Felix, who was permanently blinded instead. This was due to a recent rebellion which Ravenna took part in, in 695. Justinian II later sacked Ravenna, weakening the Exarchate in charge of it. Theophylact was not a victim of the catastrophe, but was the first Exarch to experience a weakened Ravenna. Theophylact possibly moved back to Sicily after he retired from the Exarchate in 709. Theophylact might have also been the Strategos of Sicily from 700 to 710. The Strategos of Sicily was also able to exercise some control over the autonomous duchies of Naples, Gaeta and Amalfi, depending on the local political situation or faction at the time.

=== Aghlabids, Fatimids and Kalbids ===
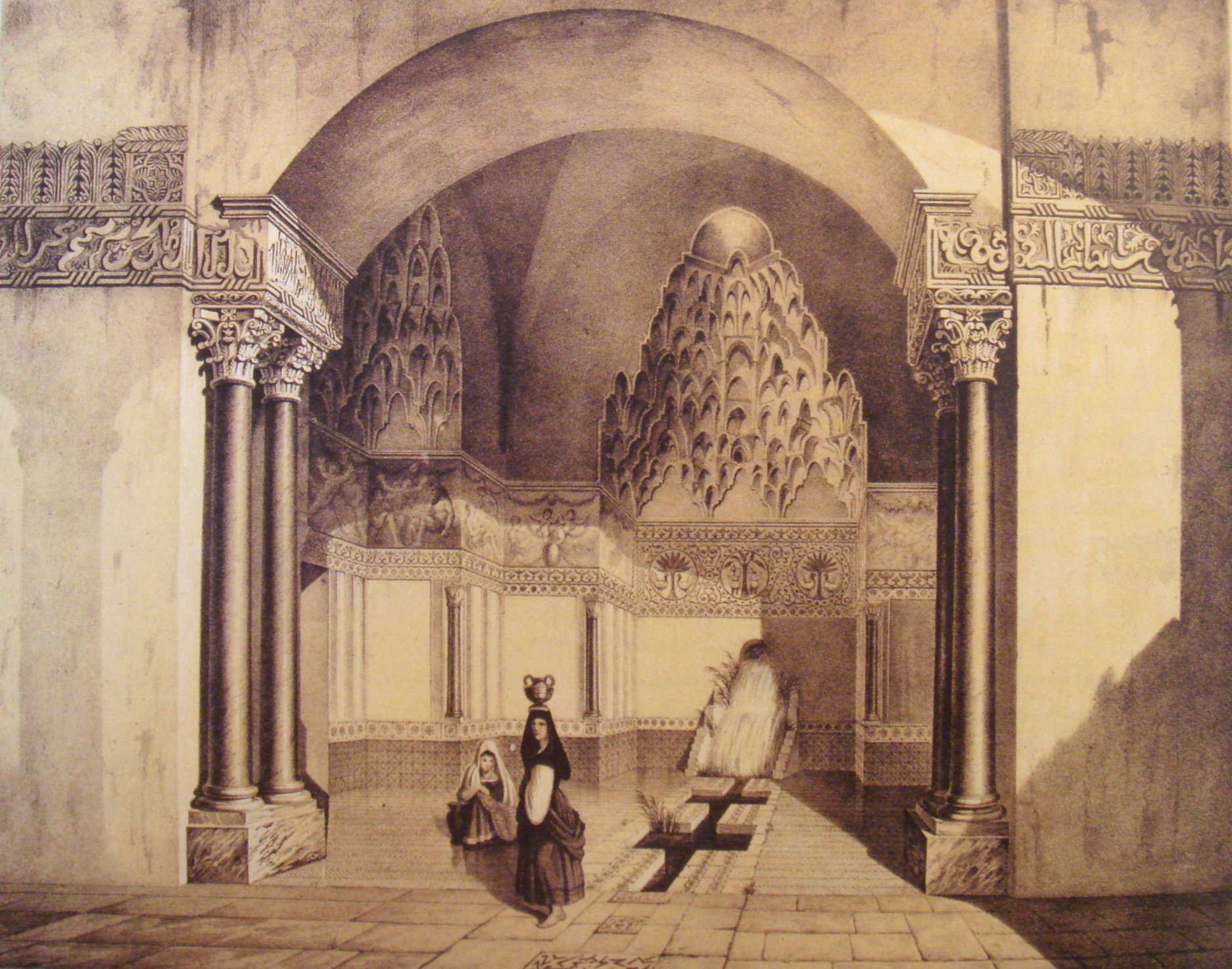
Norman–Arab–Byzantine art and architecture combined Occidental features (such as the Classical pillars and friezes) with typical Arabic decorations and calligraphy, following the Norman conquest of the former Emirate of Sicily and North Africa.

The Aghlabid invasions were in part caused by the Byzantine-Sicilian military commander Euphemius, who invited the Aghlabids to aid him in his rebellion against the imperial governor of Sicily in 826 AD. A similar situation happened a century prior, when the imperial governor of Sicily (Sergios), had declared a Byzantine official from Constantinople by the name of Basil Onomagoulos (regnal name Tiberius) as rival emperor, when false news reached Sicily that Constantinople had fallen to the Umayyads. When Emperor Leo the Syrian sent an administrative official named Paul to Sicily, the people and army of Syracuse surrendered Basil and his rebels up to him, leading to the beheading of Basil, while the former governor Sergios was able to escape to the parts of Mainland Italy controlled by the Lombards. Another rebellion took place between the years 781–793, when the aristocratic governor of Sicily, Elpidius, was accused of conspiring against Empress Irene in favour of Nikephoros. After Elpidius's forces were militarily defeated by Empress Irene's large fleet dispatched in Sicily, he, along with his lieutenant, the dux of Calabria named Nikephoros, defected to the Abbasid Caliphate, where he was posthumously acknowledged as rival emperor. After losing another military expedition, this time against Asia Minor with the help of the Abbasids, he advised the Abbasid Emir of Mesopotamia, Abd al-Malik ibn Salih, to "throw away his silk and put on his armour", warning him against the aggressive new reign of Nikephoros I. The Muslim conquest was a see-saw affair; the local population resisted fiercely and the Arabs suffered considerable dissension and infighting among themselves during this process. Not until 965 was the island's conquest successfully completed by the Fatimid Caliphate, with Syracuse in particular resisting almost to the end (Siege of Syracuse (877-878)). Jawhar the Sicilian, the Fatimid general that led the conquest of Egypt, under Caliph Al-Mu'izz li-Din Allah, was born and grew up in Ragusa, Sicily. Jawhar served as viceroy of Egypt until 973, consolidating Fatimid control over North Africa, and laying the foundations for Cairo.

The first phase of Muslim rule began with the conquests of the third Aghlabid Emir Ziyadat Allah I of Ifriqiya, and consolidated with the reign of the ninth Emir Ibrahim II of Ifriqiya after the conquest of Taormina. The first attempt to capture Syracuse was under general Asad ibn al-Furat, although it ended in a Byzantine victory. A combination of Persian and Andalusian troops helped to capture the Island between 830 and 831. After a revolt was suppressed, the Fatimid Caliph Al-Mansur Billah appointed a member of the Kalbid dynasty, Al-Hasan ibn Ali al-Kalbi, as First Emir of Sicily. The Kalbids ruled Sicily from 948 to 1053. Al-Mu'izz ibn Badis, fourth ruler of the Zirid Sanhaja dynasty in North Africa, attempted to annex the island for the Zirids, but his attempts failed. The new Arab rulers initiated land reforms, which in turn increased productivity and encouraged the growth of smallholdings, a dent to the dominance of the landed estates. The Arabs further improved irrigation systems through Qanats, introducing oranges, lemons, pistachio, and sugarcane to Sicily. Ibn Hawqal, a Baghdadi merchant who visited Sicily in 950, commented that a walled suburb called the Kasr (the palace) was the center of Palermo, with the great Friday mosque on the site of the later Roman Catholic cathedral. The suburb of Al-Khalisa (Kalsa) contained the Sultan's palace, baths, a mosque, government offices, and a private prison. Ibn Hawqual reckoned there were 7,000 individual butchers trading in 150 shops. By 1050, Palermo had a population of 350,000, making it one of the largest cities in Europe, behind Moorish-Spain's capital Córdoba and the Byzantine capital of Constantinople, which had populations over 450–500,000. Palermo's population dropped to 150,000 under Norman rule. By 1330 Palermo's population had declined to 51,000, possibly due to the inhabitants of the region being deported to other regions of Norman Sicily, or to the Norman County of Apulia and Calabria. The local population conquered by the Muslims were Greek-speaking Byzantine Christians, but there were also a significant number of Jews. Christians and Jews were tolerated in Muslim Sicily as dhimmis, and had to pay the Jizya poll tax, and Kharaj land tax, but were exempt from the Zakat alms-giving tax Muslims had to pay. Many Jews immigrated to Sicily during Muslim rule, but left after the Normans arrived.

=== Normans, Swabians and Angevins ===
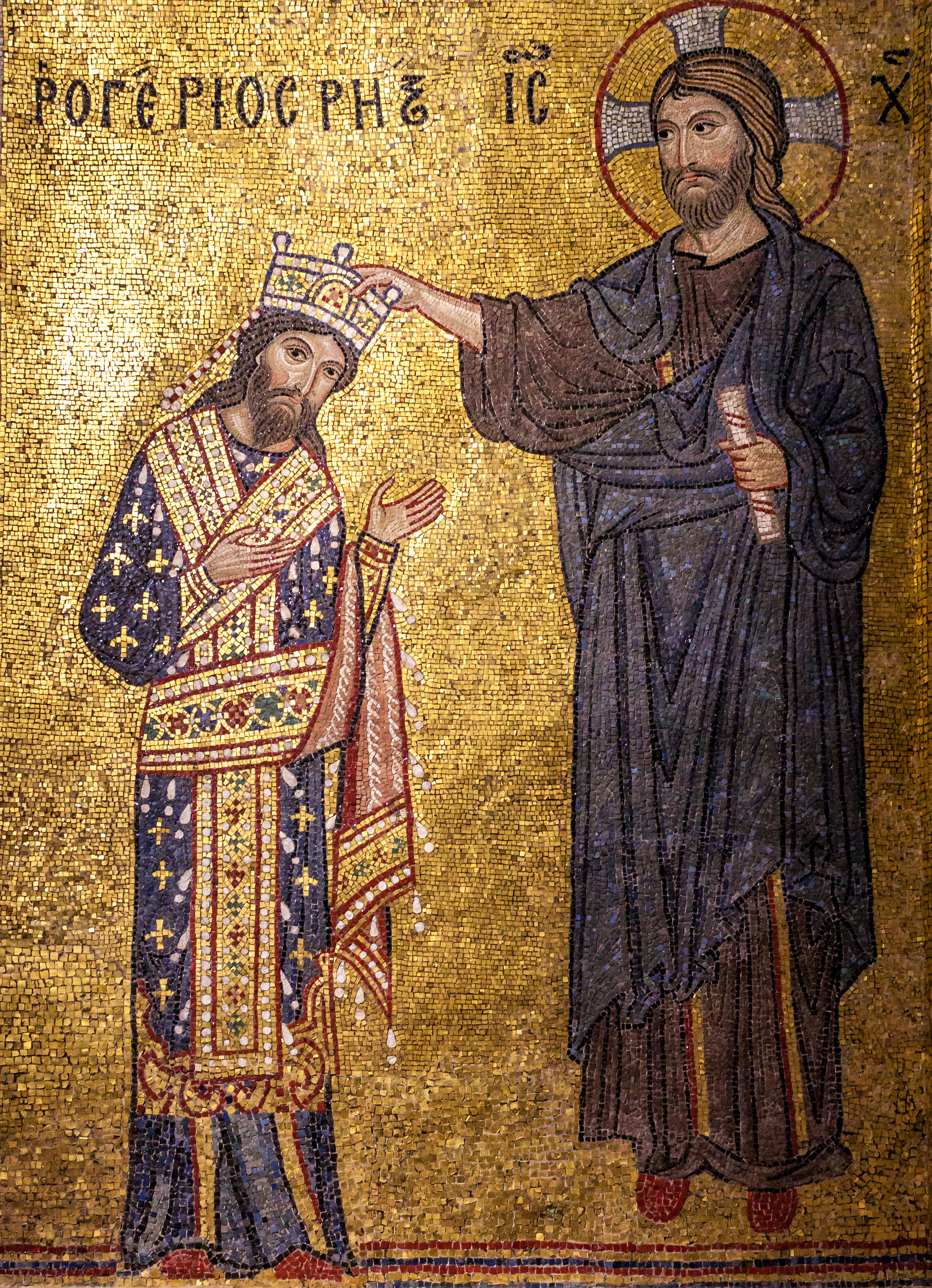
Detail of a mosaic showing Roger II (Rogerios Rex in Greek letters) receiving the crown from Jesus Christ (IC), Martorana, Palermo.

In the 10th and 11th centuries, the mainland southern Italian powers were hiring Norman mercenaries, who were Christian descendants of the Vikings. Before them, other Norsemen visited the island: in 860, according to the account of the Norman monk Dudo of Saint-Quentin, a Viking fleet, under the joint command of Alstignus, believed to be Hastein, and Björn Ironside, initially raided Sicily before landing in Italy with the aim of sacking Rome. Other Norsemen fought as mercenaries in Southern Italy, including the Varangian Guard led by Harald Hardrada, who later became king of Norway, who occupied eastern Sicily between 1038 and 1040, with the help of Norman mercenaries, under the command of William de Hauteville, who earned the nickname Iron Arm by defeating the emir of Syracuse in a duel, and a Lombard contingent, led by Arduin. The Varangians were first employed as mercenaries in Italy against the Arabs in 936. In Sweden, Runestones were erected in memory of warriors who died in Langbarðaland (Land of the Lombards), the Old Norse name for southern Italy. It was the Normans, under the leadership of Roger I of Hauteville, who wrested Sicily from the Muslims over the course of thirty years, gaining control of the entire island by 1091 as the County of Sicily. Several Anglo-Danish and Norwegian nobles and kings joined the Norman conquest of southern Italy, such as Edgar the Ætheling, who left England in 1086, Jarl Erling Skakke, who earned his nickname ("Skakke," meaning "crooked head") after a battle against the Arabs in Sicily, and Sigurd I of Norway, who led the Norwegian Crusade to support the newly established Kingdom of Jerusalem, which had been founded after the First Crusade. On the other hand, many Anglo-Saxon rebels fleeing Norman Conquest of England joined the Byzantines in their struggle against Robert Guiscard, duke of Apulia, in Southern Italy.

In 1130, the Norman Roger II founded the Kingdom of Sicily as an independent state with its own Parliament, language, schooling, army and currency, while the Sicilian culture evolved distinct traditions, clothing, linguistic changes, cuisine and customs not found in mainland Italy. The Kingdom under Roger II has been characterized as "multi-ethnic in nature and religiously tolerant". Normans, Jews, Muslim Arabs, Byzantine Greeks, Lombards and native Sicilians lived in relative harmony. However, the island's Muslims were faced with the choice of voluntary departure or subjection to Christian rule. The Muslims who could leave, apparently did so, seeking refuge in North Africa. The rest were forced to live under Christian overlordship, but they lived confined in an inner territory of western Sicily, in the area ranging from Palermo to Agrigento.

The Normans followed a policy of steady Latinization by bringing in hundreds of thousands of Lombard immigrants from mainland Italy and France. Before them, other Lombards arrived in Sicily, with an expedition departed in 1038, led by the Byzantine commander George Maniakes, which for a very short time managed to snatch Messina and Syracuse from Arab rule. The Lombards who arrived with the Byzantines settled in Maniace, Randazzo and Troina, while a group of Genoese and other Lombards from Liguria settled in Caltagirone. After the marriage between the Norman Roger I of Sicily and Adelaide del Vasto, descendant of the Aleramici family, many Northern Italian colonisers (known collectively as Lombards) left their homeland, in the Aleramici's possessions in Piedmont and Liguria (then known as Lombardy), to settle on the island of Sicily. (Note: These Lombard colonisers were natives from Northern Italy and should not be confused with the Lombard Germanic tribe, who were referred to as Longobardi to distinguish them from the locals of the region who were known as Lombardi.) The new Roman Catholic monarchs gradually replaced Orthodox clergy with Latin clerics.

Lombard pogroms against Muslims started in the 1160s. Muslim and Christian communities in Sicily became increasingly geographically separated. The island's Muslim communities were mainly isolated beyond an internal frontier that divided the south and western half of the island from the Christian north and eastern half; in particular, the northeast region of Val Demone had remained predominantly Byzantine Greek and Christian, even during Islamic rule. (Note: Loud, G. A. (2007). The Latin Church in Norman Italy. Cambridge University Press. p. 494. ISBN 978-0-521-25551-6.: At the end of the twelfth century ... While in Apulia Greeks were in a majority–and indeed present in any numbers at all–only in the Salento peninsula in the extreme south, at the time of the conquest they had an overwhelming preponderance in Lucania and central and southern Calabria, as well as comprising anything up to a third of the population of Sicily, concentrated especially in the north-east of the island, the Val Demone.) As a subject people, Sicilian Muslims became dependent on the mercy of their Christian masters and, ultimately, on royal protection. After King William the Good died in 1189, royal protection was lifted, and the door was opened for widespread attacks against the island's Muslims. This destroyed any lingering hope of coexistence, however unequal the respective populations might have been.

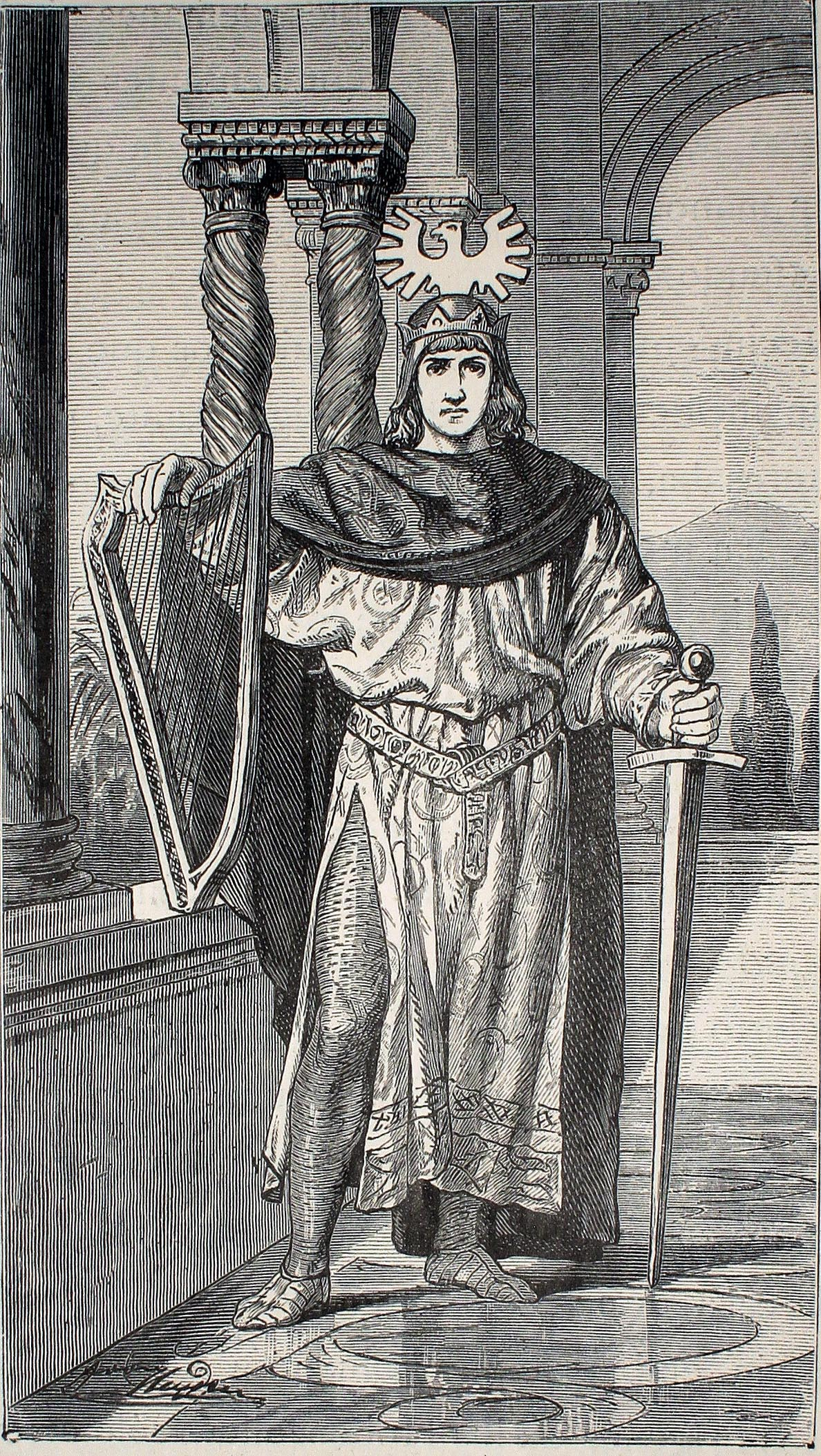
Holy Roman Emperor Frederick II. Frederick was known as stupor mundi (wonder of the world) to his contemporaries, regarded by Nietzsche as the first European and by many historians as the first modern ruler

The Siculo-Norman rule of the Hauteville dynasty continued until 1198, when Frederick II of Sicily, the son of a Siculo-Norman queen and a Swabian-German emperor ascended the throne. During his reign the poetic form known as a sonnet was invented by Giacomo da Lentini, the head Poet, Teacher and Notary of the Sicilian School for Poetry. In 1221 Frederick II launched a series of military campaigns against the Sicilian Muslims. The Hohenstaufen forces rooted out the defenders of Jato, Entella, and the other fortresses. In 1223, rather than exterminate the Muslims, who numbered about 60,000, Frederick II began deporting them to Lucera in Apulia, where many were enslaved to farm lands and perform domestic labor. From 1224 to 1239 some of these Muslims tried to return in Sicily, but in 1239 Frederick decided to deport all of them to Lucera. The annihilation of Islam in Sicily was completed by the late 1240s when the final deportations to Lucera took place.

As a result of the Arab expulsion, many towns across Sicily were left depopulated. By the 12th century, Swabian kings and their successors granted immigrants from northern Italy (particularly Piedmont, Lombardy and Liguria), Latium and Tuscany in central Italy, and French regions of Normandy, Provence and Brittany (all collectively known as Lombards.) settlement into Sicily, re-establishing the Latin element into the island, a legacy which can be seen in the many Gallo-Italic dialects and towns found in the interior and western parts of Sicily, brought by these settlers. Other migrants arrived from southern Italy, as well as Normandy, southern France, England, Swabia and other parts of northern Europe. Additional Tuscan migrants settled in Sicily after the Florentine conquest of Pisa in 1406. This social process laid the groundwork for the introduction of Latin (as opposed to Byzantine) Catholicism. The process of Latinization was fostered largely by the Roman Church and its liturgy.

The Hohenstaufen governed Sicily until the Papacy invited a French prince to take the throne, which led to a decade-and-a-half of French rule under Charles I of Sicily; he was later deposed in the War of the Sicilian Vespers against French rule, which put the daughter of Manfred of Sicily – Constance II and her husband Peter III of Aragon, a member of the House of Barcelona, on the throne. Their descendants ruled the Kingdom of Sicily until 1401. Following the Compromise of Caspe in 1412 the Sicilian throne passed to the Iberian monarchs from Aragon and Castile.

=== Modern and contemporary history ===
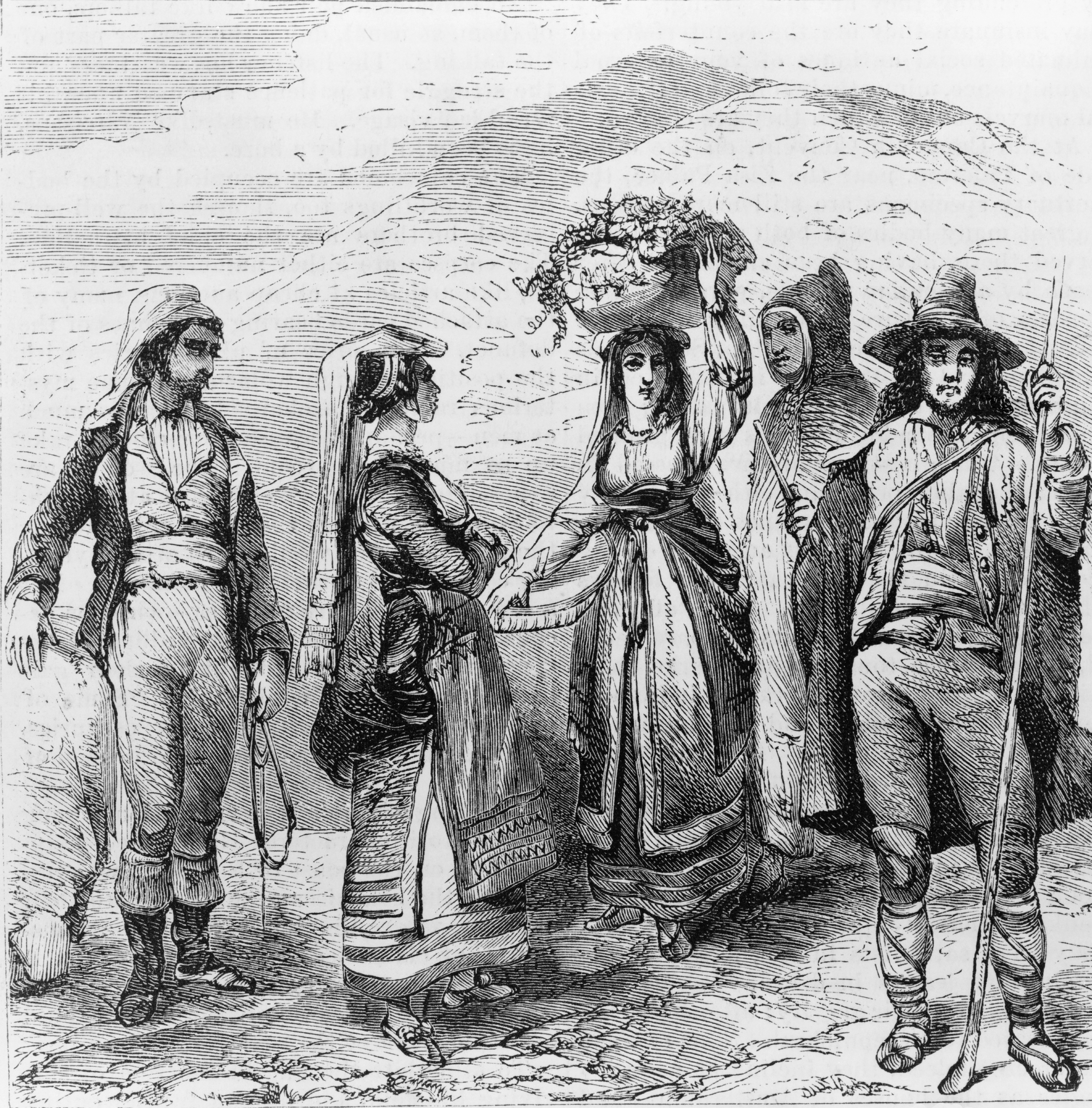
Sicilians in traditional dress

In 1735, the Spanish era ended when Charles V from the House of Bourbon was crowned king. For the better part of the next century-and-a-half, Sicily was in personal union with the other Southern Italian Kingdom of Naples, with the official residence located in Naples, under the Bourbon dynasty. After the Napoleonic Wars, King Ferdinand I, who had just recently been restored back to the throneship of Southern Italy in 1815, made a decision to administratively and politically merged the two separate Kingdoms of Naples and Sicily, which ended up forming the Kingdom of the Two Sicilies in 1816. In 1861, however, Sicily became part of the Kingdom of Italy as a result of the Risorgimento. Prior to the Risorgimento, the Two Sicilies were conquered by the Kingdom of Sardinia during the Expedition of the Thousand (led by general Giuseppe Garibaldi) in 1860, and subsequently brought under the monarchial realm of Sardinia. After the unification of Italy and the Fascist era, a wave of Sicilian nationalism led to the adoption of the Statute of Sicily, under which the island has become an autonomous region. Since 1946, the island enjoys the most advanced special status of all the autonomous regions.

== Demographics ==
Historical population
Year	Pop.	±%
1861	2,409,000	—
1871	2,590,000	+7.5%
1881	2,933,000	+13.2%
1901	3,568,000	+21.7%
1911	3,812,000	+6.8%
1921	4,223,000	+10.8%
1931	3,906,000	−7.5%
1936	4,000,000	+2.4%
1951	4,487,000	+12.2%
1961	4,721,000	+5.2%
1971	4,681,000	−0.8%
1981	4,907,000	+4.8%
1991	4,966,000	+1.2%
2001	4,969,000	+0.1%
2011	5,002,904	+0.7%
2020	4,833,705	−3.4%
Source: ISTAT 2022

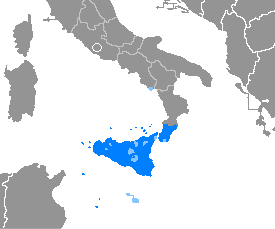
Distribution of the Sicilian people.

Sicily has experienced the presence of a number of different cultures and ethnicities in its vast history, including the aboriginal peoples of differing ethnolinguistic origins (Sicani, Siculi including Morgetes and Elymians), Punics, Ancient Greeks (Siceliotes), Mamertines, Romans during the ancient and classical periods.

In the Early Middle Ages, Sicily was ruled by the Vandals, then by the Ostrogoths, and finally by the Byzantines. Under Saracen and Norman rule, Byzantine Greeks, Arabs, Lombards, and Normans coexisted peacefully, leading to the formation of a unique Norman-Arab-Byzantine culture. Subsequently, the Swabians and Angevins ruled the Kingdom of Sicily and progressively expelled the island's Muslim populations, largely made up of Arabs, Berbers, and local converts to Islam, settling Lombards from mainland Italy and France in their place. The Aragonese and the Habsburgs expelled the Jews and invited Christian Albanians to settle on the Island and form communities that still exist today, known as Arbereshe.

About five million people live in Sicily, making it the fourth most populated region in Italy. However, in the first century after the Italian unification, Sicily had one of the most negative net migration rates among the regions of Italy because of millions of people moving to the Italian mainland and countries like Germany, Sweden, Belgium, the United States, Canada, Australia, Brazil, Argentina, the United Kingdom, France, New Zealand, Singapore and South Africa. Many Sicilian communities, including those formed by the descendants of the Sicilian migrants, are all over the world. It is estimated that the number of people of Sicilian descent in the world is more than six million. The most famous community is represented by the Sicilian Americans. Like the other parts of Southern Italy, immigration to the island is relatively low compared to other regions of Italy because workers tend to head to Northern Italy instead, in search of better employment and industrial opportunities. The most recent ISTAT figures show around 175,000 immigrants out of the total of almost 5.1 million population (nearly 3.5% of the population); Romanians with more than 50,000 make up the most immigrants, followed by Tunisians, Moroccans, Sri Lankans, Albanians, and others mostly from Eastern Europe. As in the rest of Italy, the primary religion is Roman Catholicism (but with combined Latin & Byzantine Rites) and the official language is Italian; Sicilian is currently not a recognised language in Italy.

=== Major settlements ===
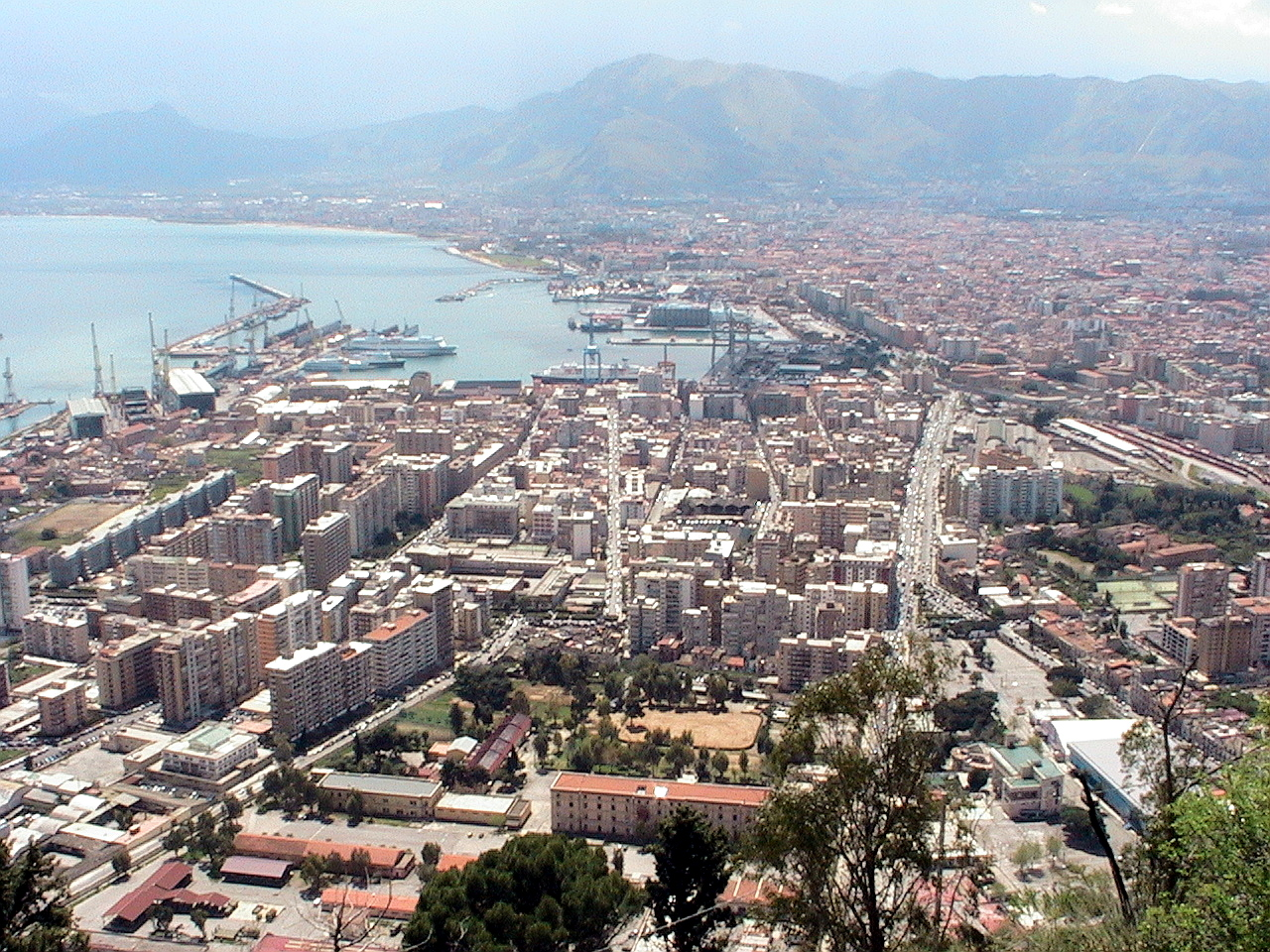
The city of Palermo in 2005.

In Sicily, there are three metropolitan areas:

1. Palermo, which has a Larger Urban Zone of 1,044,169 people
2. Catania, whose LUZ's populous numbers some 801,280 people
3. Messina and its LUZ, with a total of 418,916 people.

Overall, there are fifteen cities and towns with a population above 50,000 people, these are:

1. Palermo (677,854)
2. Catania (315,576)
3. Messina (242,121)
4. Syracuse (123,248)
5. Marsala (82,812)
6. Gela (77,295)
7. Ragusa (73,756)
8. Trapani (70,642)
9. Vittoria (63,393)
10. Caltanissetta (60,221)
11. Agrigento (59,190)
12. Bagheria (56,421)
13. Modica (55,294)
14. Acireale (53,205)
15. Mazara del Vallo (51,413).

=== Names and surnames ===
The most common Sicilian names are Giuseppe, Maria and Salvatore. The most common Sicilian surnames are Russo, Messina and Lombardo.

Most common names and surnames
1	Giuseppe	Russo
2	Maria	Messina
3	Salvatore	Lombardo
4	Francesco	Caruso
5	Giovanni	Marino
6	Vincenzo	Rizzo
7	Giuseppa	Grasso
8	Carmelo	Greco
9	Rosa	Romano
10	Concetta	Parisi
11	Carmela	Amato
12	Anna	Puglisi
13	Angelo	La Rosa
14	Pietro	Costa
15	Antonio	Vitale
16	Francesca	Arena
17	Angela	Pappalardo
18	Rosario	Bruno
19	Gaetano	Catalano
20	Giovanna	Randazzo

== Diaspora ==
In 2008, the number of Sicilians abroad was well over 1 million. The countries in which they are most numerous on this date are: United States, Germany, Belgium, Switzerland, Argentina, Uruguay, Brazil, France and Canada. The population of the Diaspora without including those in the United States is 629,114 individuals.

In the United States, the Sicilian-Americans are a large subset of Americans whose ancestors came from Sicily. This group is perhaps the largest part of the Sicilian diaspora.

The entire autochthonous population of Malta is of Sicilian origin, but the Maltese generally do not consider themselves Sicilian due to centuries of cultural and geographical separation, and the fact that their native language evolved from Siculo-Arabic instead of Italo-Dalmatian like the modern Sicilian language.

== Genetics ==
=== Autosomal studies ===
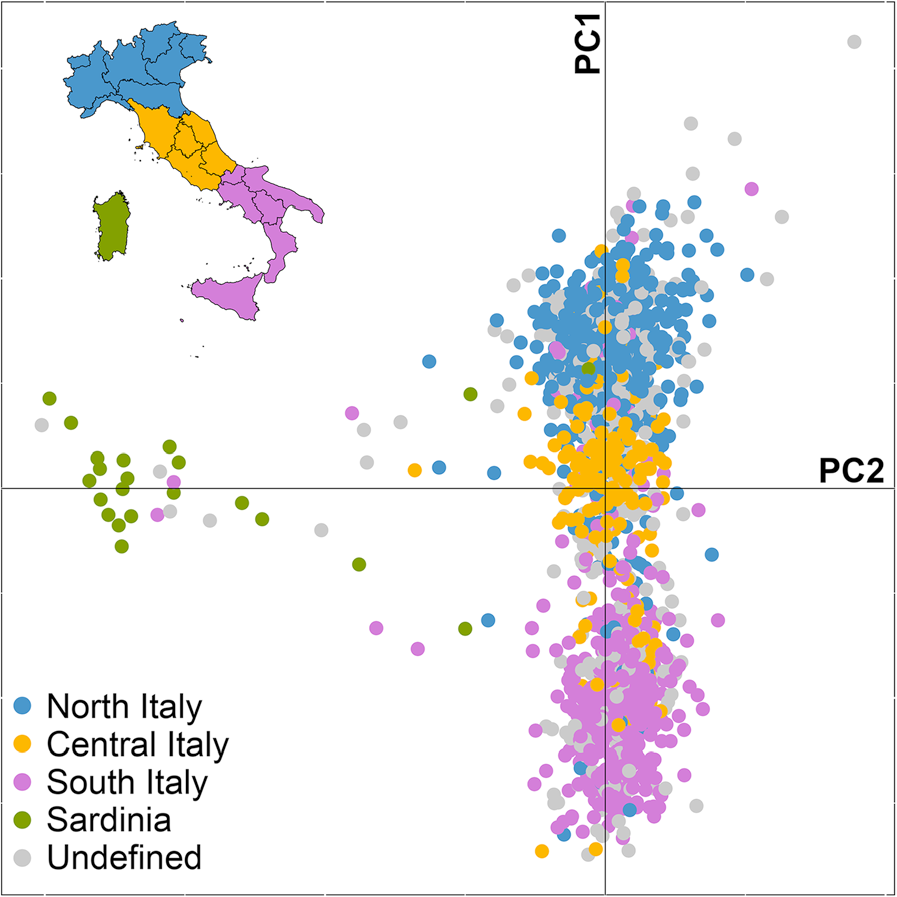
Principal Component Analysis of the Italian population

Several studies involving whole-genome analysis of mainland Italians from the peninsula and Sicily have found that samples from Northern Italy, Southern Italy and Sicily belong to their own distinct and unique clusters, while a genetic gap is filled by an intermediate Central Italian cluster, creating a continuous cline of variation that mirrors geography. From a genetic standpoint, Sicilians cluster most closely with other Southern Italians, particularly Calabrians and Apulians. Other studies have also shown that the population of Sicily is genetically very similar to Maltese, and to Greek-speaking groups from the Ionian Islands, the Aegean Islands, Crete and the Peloponnese, while the rest of mainland Greece appears as slightly differentiated, by clustering with other populations of the Southern Balkans, such as the Albanians of Albania and Kosovo, and the Arbëreshë.

A 2022 genome-wide analysis of Italian, Greek and Balkan populations revealed substantial genetic affinities between the majority of sampled Sicilians and contemporary populations from the Western Peloponnese, Apulia and Calabria. Approximately 16–23% of Sicilians exhibited genetic affinities with Albanians from Kosovo and Greek populations from Messenia, Laconia, and Macedonia, whereas 16–30% showed affinities with Central and Northern Italian populations. Furthermore, some individuals from eastern Sicily and Apulia clustered genetically with the Tsakonians, a Greek-speaking population of the eastern Peloponnese.

=== mtDNA and Y-DNA studies ===
According to one study that sampled individuals from Agrigento, Catania, Ragusa and Siracusa, Y-DNA haplogroups were found at the following frequencies: R1 (36,2%), J2 (19,1%), E1b1b (17,7%), G (12%), J1 (6,4%). I (5%), T (2,1%). R1 and I haplogroups are typical in West European and North European populations while J, T, G, Q and E1b1b (and their various subclades) consist of lineages with differential distribution across Europe and the Mediterranean. The five main MtDNA haplogroups present in Sicily are haplogroups H, K, X, W and U, which are also the five most commonly found MtDNA-haplogroups in Europe and the Caucasus.

The Norman Kingdom of Sicily was created in 1130, with Palermo as its capital, 70 years after the initial Norman invasion and 40 after the conquest of the last town, Noto in 1091, and would last until 1198. Today, it is in north-west Sicily, around Trapani, Palermo and Agrigento where Norman Y-DNA is the most common, with 8% to 20% of the lineages belonging to haplogroup I1. In the rest of the island the percentages are from 15% to 8%. Ancient and medieval Greek genetic paternal legacy is estimated at 37% in Sicily. Sicilians are of European genetic origin, with modern genetic profiles that are closely similar to people who lived in the region of Magna Graecia during the Classical antiquity period, these people were a mix of Italic Roman and Greek genetic ancestry. Sicilians closely resemble mainland Italians and Greeks genetically. Overall, the estimated Balkan and Northwestern European paternal contributions in Sicily are about 63% and 26% respectively.

Frequencies (in %) of haplogroups.
Y-chromosome	mtDNA
3,5% I1	5% HV
3,5% I2	45,2% H
4,5% R1a	2,3% HV0+V
30,5% R1b	6,7% J
9% G	7,1% T
23% J2	10% U*
3% J* + J1	6,3% K
18% E1b1b	6% N1+I
4% T	1% N2+W
0% L	3,7% X
1% Q	6,7% Other

=== Paleogenetics ===
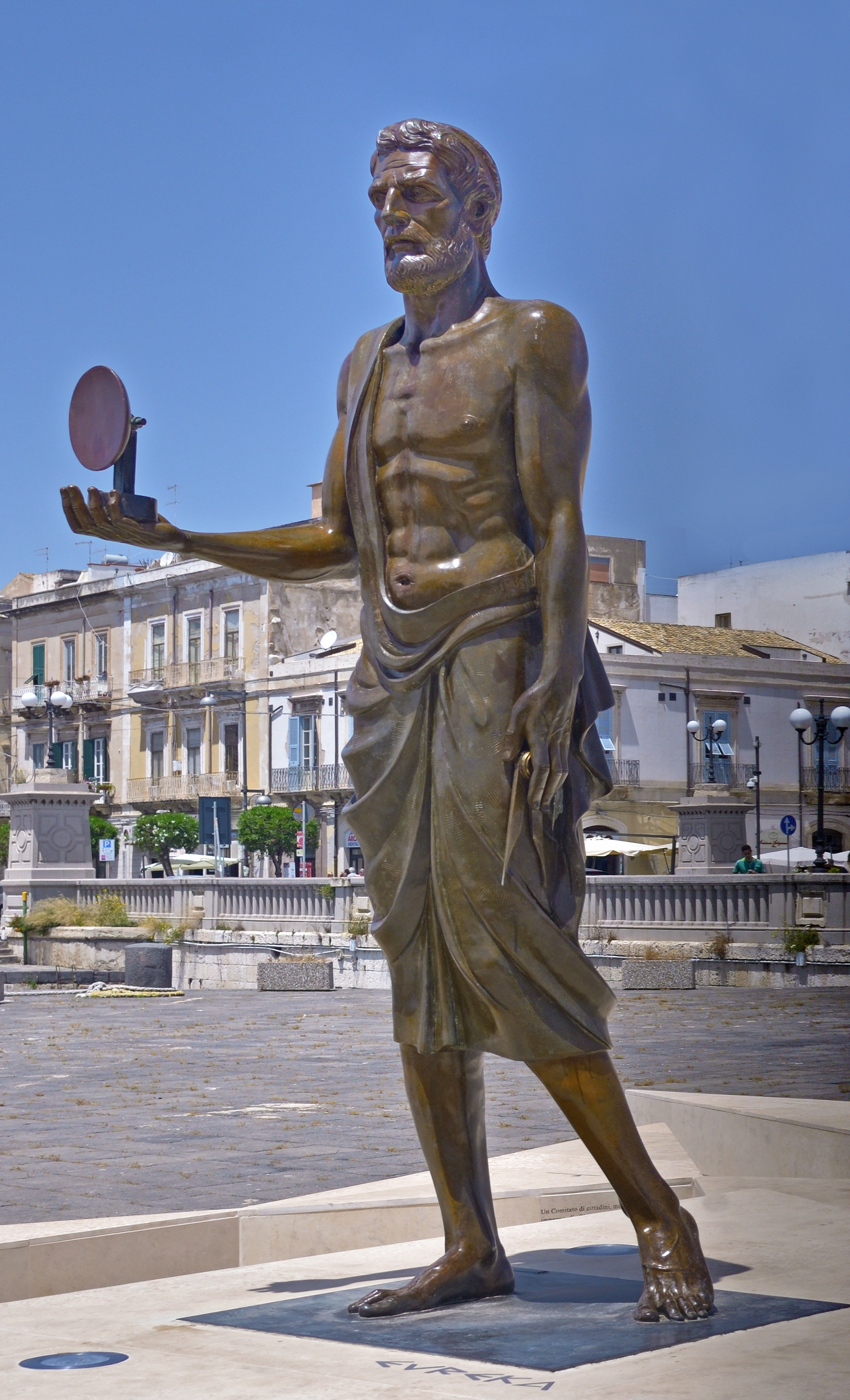
Monument in Syracuse, Sicily to Archimedes, Hellenic Sicilian polymath

Fernandes et al. (2019), The Arrival of Steppe and Iranian Related Ancestry in the Islands of the Western Mediterranean, found that in Sicily, Western Steppe Herders ancestry arrived by ~2200 BCE and likely came at least in part from Spain. 4 of the 5 Early Bronze Age Sicilian males had Steppe-associated Y-haplogroup R1b1a1a2a1a2 (R-P312). Two of these were Y-haplogroup R1b1a1a2a1a2a1 (Z195) which today is largely restricted to Iberia and has been hypothesized to have originated there 2500–2000 BCE.

A 2022 genome-wide study of more than 700 individuals from the South Mediterranean area (102 from Southern Italy), combined with ancient DNA from neighbouring areas, found high affinities of South-Eastern Italians with modern Eastern Peloponnesians, and a closer affinity of ancient Greek genomes with those from specific regions of South Italy than modern Greek genomes. The study also discovered common genetic sources shared between South Italy and Peloponnese, which can be modeled as a mixture of Anatolian Neolithic and Iranian Chalcolithic ancestries.

A 2023 genetic study analyzed the remains of 54 people who lived between the eighth and fifth centuries BC in Himera, an ancient Greek colony in Sicily. The results show that the main group of Himeraean soldiers had ancestry that was a mix of the local Sicilian population and people related to the Bronze Age Aegeans. This suggests that many soldiers were descendants of Greek colonists in Sicily and that intermarriage between Greeks and Sicilian locals was practiced. The rest of the army consisted of mercenaries whose ancestors came from northern Europe, the Steppe, and the Caucasus.

Monnereau et al. (2024) analyzed burials at the site of Segesta to investigate the interactions between Muslim and Christian communities during the Middle Ages in Sicily. The biomolecular and Isotopic results suggest the Christians remained genetically distinct from the Muslim community at Segesta while following a substantially similar diet. Based on these results, the authours suggest that the two communities at Segesta could have followed endogamy rules.

A 2025 genetic study analyzed the remains of 196 people from 14 archaeological sites linked to the Phoenicians and Punic people, including sites in Sicily and Sardinia. The results suggest that, during the early stages of Phoenician colonization, the expansion of Punic communities was mainly driven by people with Sicilian-Aegean ancestry. In contrast, Phoenicians from the Levant contributed little or no genetic ancestry to Punic settlements in the central and western Mediterranean. North African ancestry became common in the Punic world only after 400 BC. This suggests that the growing power and influence of Carthage helped spread this ancestry to other areas. However, North African ancestry remained a small part of the genetic background of the people studied at all the sites, including Carthage itself.

Monnereau et al. (2026) found evidence of mobility or gene flow from North Africa and the Near East during the period of Islamic rule on the island (800–1050 CE). However, by the late Middle Ages, data indicate a demographic shift towards modern European populations, with individuals from this period showing a general resemblance to present-day Sicilians.

== Culture ==
=== Languages ===
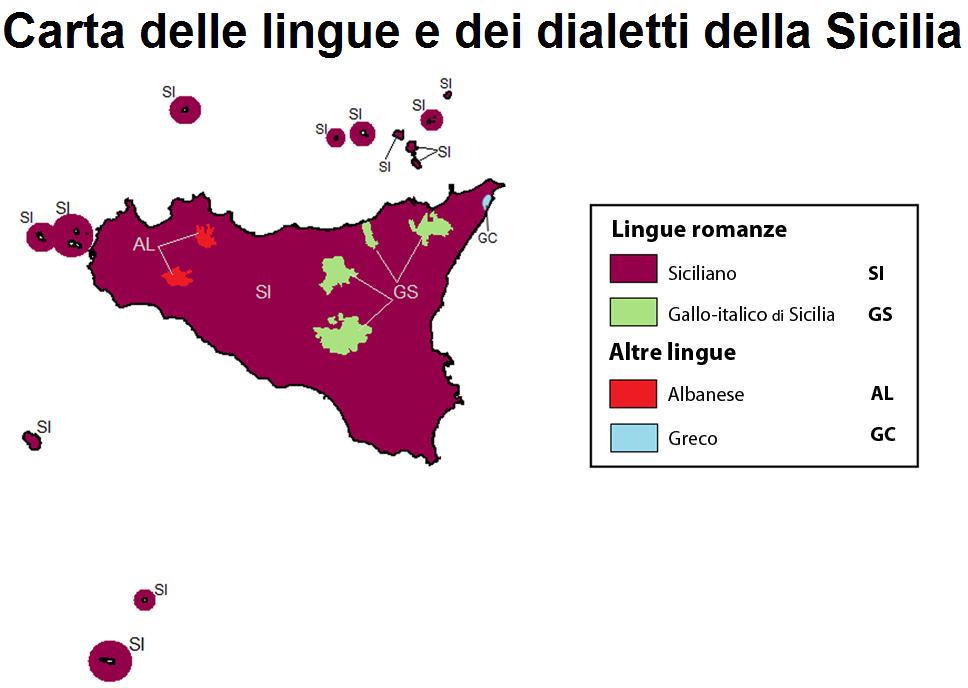
Languages of Sicily

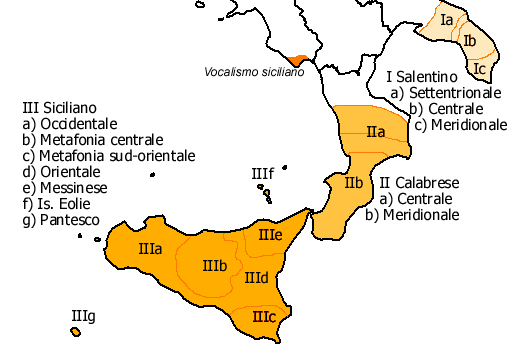
Dialects of the Sicilian language

Today in Sicily most people are bilingual and speak both Italian and Sicilian, a distinct Romance language. Many Sicilian words are of Greek origin, while smaller numbers of other loan words are from Norman, Arabic, Catalan, Occitan, Spanish and other languages. Other dialects of Sicilian, or those very closely related to it, are also spoken in southern Calabria, Salento and Lower Cilento.

Sicilian was an early influence in the development of standard Italian, although its use remained confined to an intellectual elite. This was a literary language in Sicily created under the auspices of Frederick II and his court of notaries or Magna Curia which, headed by Giacomo da Lentini, also gave birth to the Sicilian School, widely inspired by troubadour literature. It is in this language that appeared the first sonnet, whose invention is attributed to Giacomo da Lentini himself. Sicilian was also the official language of the Kingdom of Sicily from 1300 to 1543.

Prior to the 20th century, large numbers of Sicilian people spoke only Sicilian as their mother tongue, with little or no fluent knowledge of Italian. Today, although not officially recognized by the Italian Republic, the Sicilian language is described as "a stable indigenous language of Italy" by Ethnologue and is recognized as a minority language by UNESCO. It has also been identified as a language by the Sicilian Region. Even so, Italian continues to be the sole official language recognized by the Italian Republic and predominates in the public arena, being used as everyday language in the daily lives of many Sicilians.

The Siculo-Arabic dialect was a vernacular variety of Arabic once spoken in Sicily and neighbouring Malta between the end of the ninth century and the mid to late thirteenth century. The language became extinct in Sicily, but in Malta it eventually evolved into what is now the Maltese language.

The Siculish dialect is the macaronic "Sicilianization" of English language words and phrases by immigrants from Sicily to the United States in the early 20th century. Forms of Siculish are also to be found in other Sicilian immigrant communities of English-speaking countries, namely Canada and Australia. A surprising similarity can often be found between these forms, through either coincidence, trans-national movements of Sicilian immigrants, or more likely, through the logical adaptation of English using linguistic norms from the Sicilian language.

==== Ethno-linguistic minorities ====
There are two main historical ethno-linguistic minorities in Sicily, the Lombards of Sicily and the Arbëreshë:

- The Lombards of Sicily are a linguistic minority living in Sicily who speak Gallo-Italic of Sicily, an isolated group of Gallo-Italic languages found in about 15 isolated communities of central eastern Sicily. Forming a language island within the Sicilian language, it dates back to migrations from Northern Italy to central and eastern Sicily about 900 years ago, during the Norman conquest of Sicily. Because of linguistic differences among the Gallo-Italic dialects of Sicily, it is supposed that there were different immigration routes. From Piedmont, Liguria, Emilia, and Lombardy they began to spread south between the 11th and 14th centuries. The most important areas where the Gallo-Italic of Sicily is spoken are Acquedolci, Montalbano Elicona, Novara di Sicilia, Fondachelli-Fantina San Fratello and San Piero Patti (Province of Messina), Aidone, Nicosia, Piazza Armerina and Sperlinga (Province of Enna).

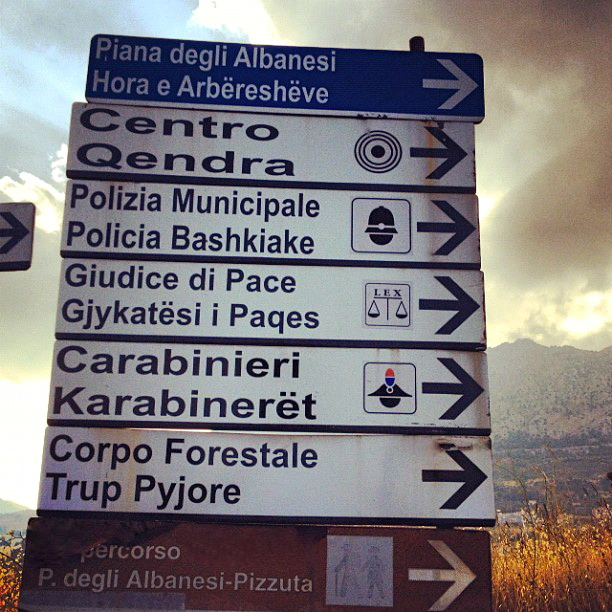
Bilingual road signs, in Italian and Arbëresh, in Piana degli Albanesi

- The Arbëreshë people settled in Southern Italy in the 15th to 18th centuries in several waves of migrations. They are the descendants of mostly Tosk Albanian refugees of Christian faith who fled to Italy after the conquest and subsequent Islamisation of Albania by the Ottoman Turks in the Balkans. They speak their own variant of the Arbëresh language. There are three identified Arbëreshë communities in the province of Palermo. The areas are: Contessa Entellina, Piana degli Albanesi and Santa Cristina Gela; while the varieties of Piana and Santa Cristina Gela are similar enough to be entirely mutually intelligible, the variety of Contessa Entellina is not entirely intelligible. The largest centre is Piana degli Albanesi which, besides being the hub of religious and socio-cultural communities, has kept their unique features intact over time. There are two other communities with a strong historical and linguistic heritage.
- The community of the Greeks of Messina (or Siculo-Greeks) speaks modern Greek with some elements of the ancient Greek language spoken in the island, and Calabrian Greek. The Greek community was reconstituted in 2003 with the name of "Comunità Hellenica dello Stretto" (Hellenic Community of the Strait).

=== Religion ===
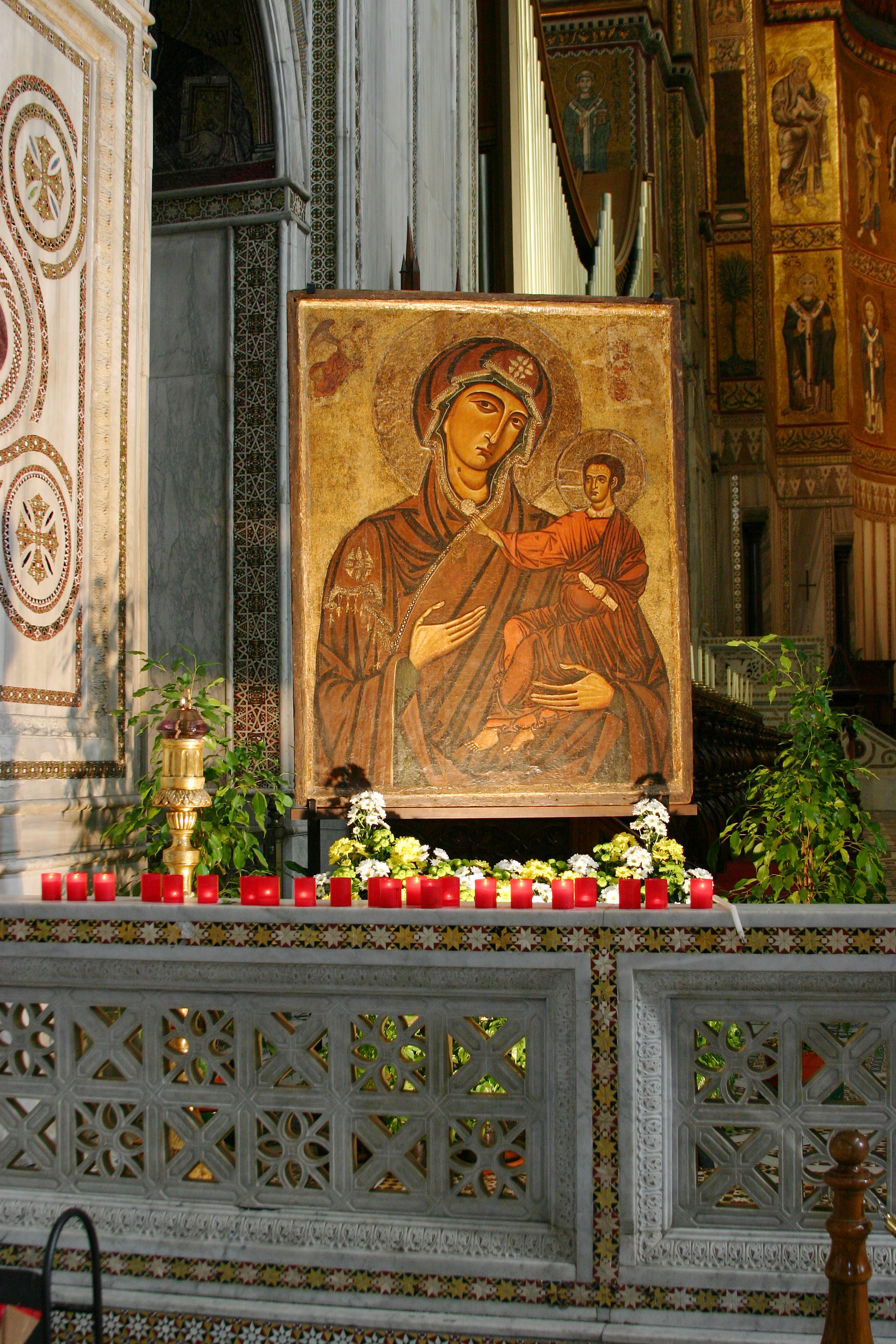
Virgin Hodegetria, Monreale Cathedral

Historically, Sicily has been home to many religions, including Islam, Native religions, Judaism, Classical Paganism, Carthaginian religions, and Byzantine Orthodoxy, the coexistence of which has been historically seen as an ideal example of religious multiculturalism. Most Sicilians today are baptized as Catholic. Catholicism and Latinization in Sicily originated from the islands Norman occupiers and forced conversion continued under the Spanish invaders, where the majority of Sicily's population were forced to convert from their former religions. Despite the historical push for Catholicism in Sicily, a minority of other religious communities thrive in Sicily.

Sicilian Catholics

For Catholics in Sicily, the Virgin Hodegetria is the patroness of Sicily. The Sicilian people are also known for their deep devotion to some Sicilian female saints: the martyrs Agatha and Lucy, who are the patron saints of Catania and Syracuse respectively, and the hermit Saint Rosalia, patroness of Palermo. Sicilian people have significantly contributed to the history of many religions. There have been four Sicilian Popes (Agatho, Leo II, Sergius I, and Stephen III) and a Sicilian Ecumenical Patriarch of Constantinople (Methodios I). Sicily is also mentioned in the New Testament in the Acts of the Apostles, 28:11–13, in which Saint Paul briefly visits Sicily for three days before leaving the Island. It is believed he was the first Christian to ever set foot in Sicily.

Sicilian Muslims During the period of Muslim rule, many Sicilians converted to Islam. Many Islamic scholars were born on the island, including Al-Maziri, a prominent jurist of the Maliki school of Sunni Islamic Law. Under the rule of Frederick II, all Muslims were expelled from the Island following a rebellion of local Saracens who wished to keep their local independence in Western Sicily but were not allowed to due to Pope Gregory IX's demands. Any remaining Muslim was eventually expelled by the Spanish inquisition.

In more recent years, many immigrants from predominantly Muslim countries like Pakistan, Albania, Bangladesh, Morocco, Egypt, and Tunisia have arrived on Sicily. In 1980, Catania, a city on the eastern coast of Sicily, became home to Italy's first modern mosque. Also known as the Omar Mosque, it was financed by Libya.

Sicilian Jewish community

There is a legend that the Jews were first brought to Sicily as captive slaves in the 1st century after the Fall of Jerusalem in 70 CE by the Romans. However, it is generally presumed that Sicily's Jewish population was ceded before the destruction of the Temple of Jerusalem. Rabbi Akiva visited the city of Syracuse during one of his trips abroad. Judaism in Sicily was the first monotheistic religion to appear on the Island. The Jewish Sicilian community remained until the Aragonese rulers' Queen Isabella I of Castile and Ferdinand II of Aragon, expelled them in the year 1493 with the Alhambra Decree. On 3 February 1740, the Neapolitan King Charles III – hailed as an Enlightenment King, issued a proclamation containing 37 paragraphs, in which Jews for the first time were formally invited to return to Sicily. However, the effort was generally unsuccessful.

The Sicilian Jewish community still has several active members and has made a limited recovery in recent years. In the year 2005, for the first time since the Expulsion, a Passover Seder was conducted in Sicily (in Palermo), held by a Milanese Rabbi. The Jewish community in Sicily is led in part by Rabbi Stefano Di Mauro, a Sicilian American descendant of Sicilian neofiti. He opened a small synagogue in 2008, but he has not yet set up a full-time Jewish congregation in Sicily. Services are held weekly on Shabbat and the High Holy Days. Also, Shavei Israel has expressed interest in helping to facilitate the return of the Sicilian Bnei Anusim to Judaism.

== Gallery ==
Photographs of Sicilians

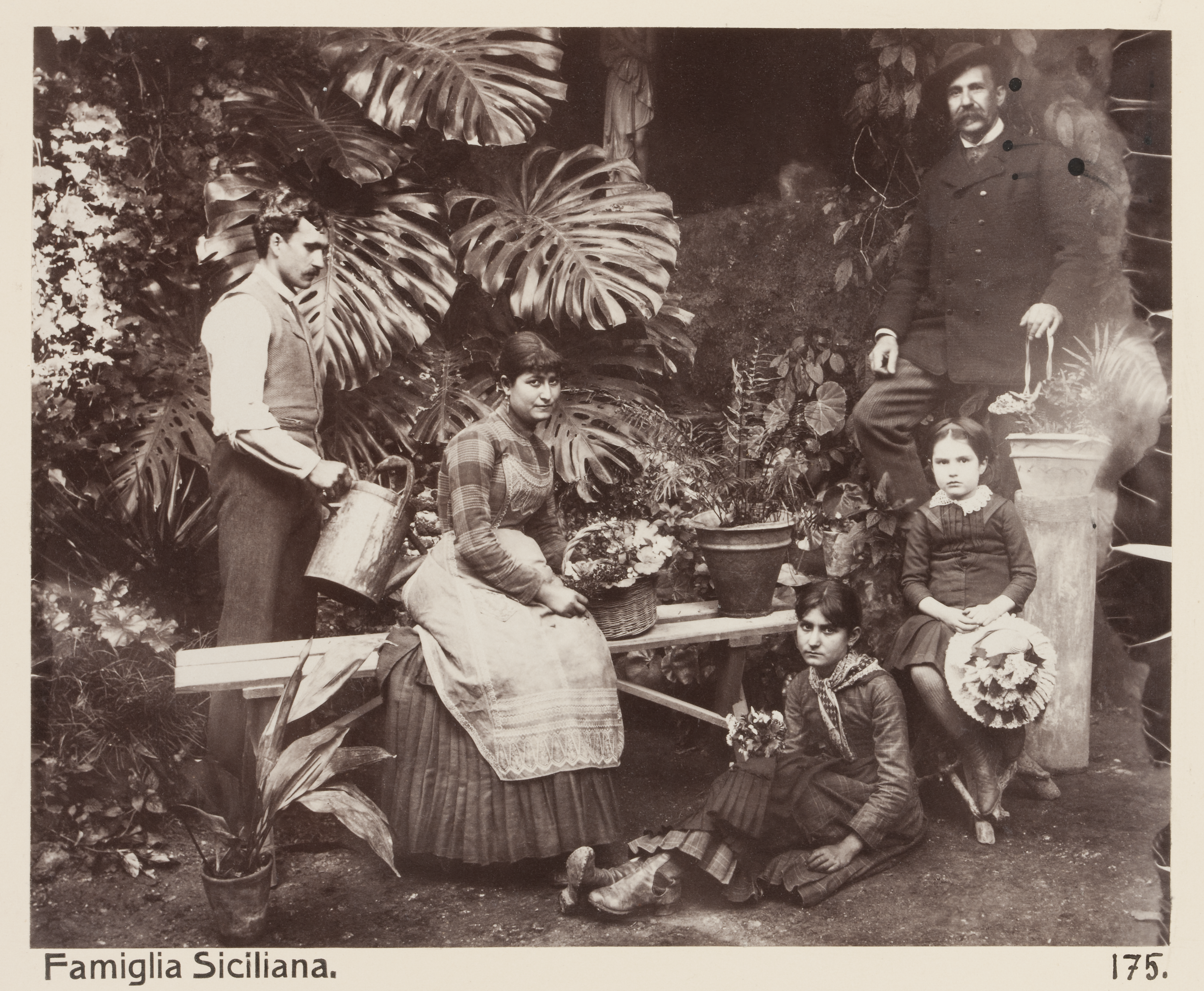
Sicilian family - 1888

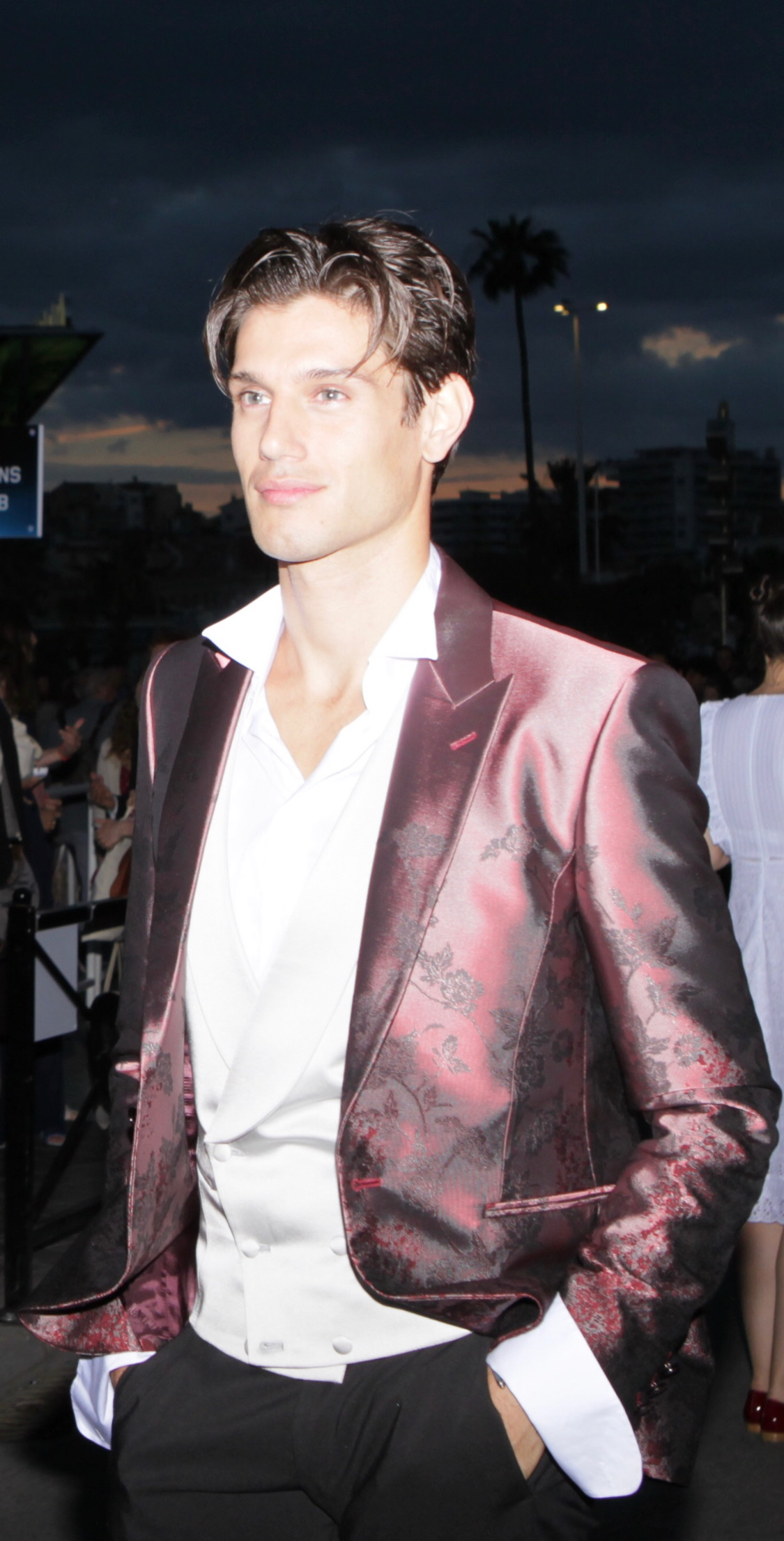
Marco Castelli, Sicilian Model - 2021

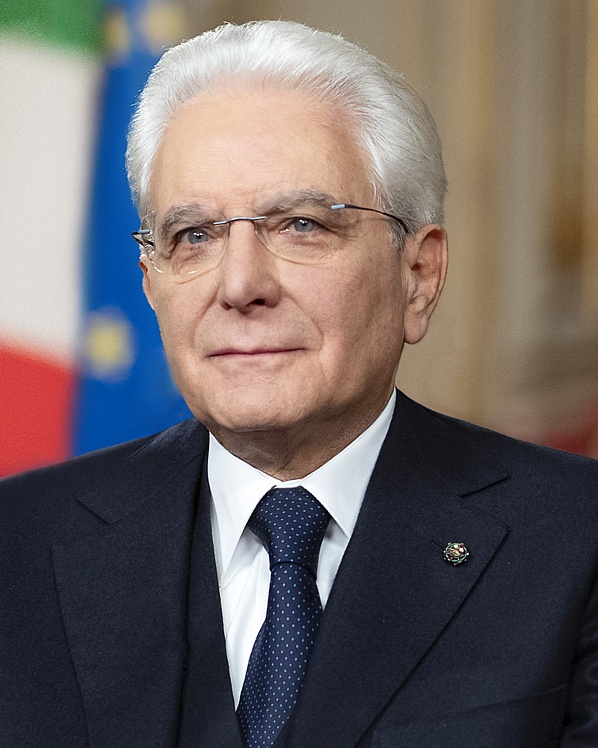
Sergio Mattarella, President of Italy - 2021

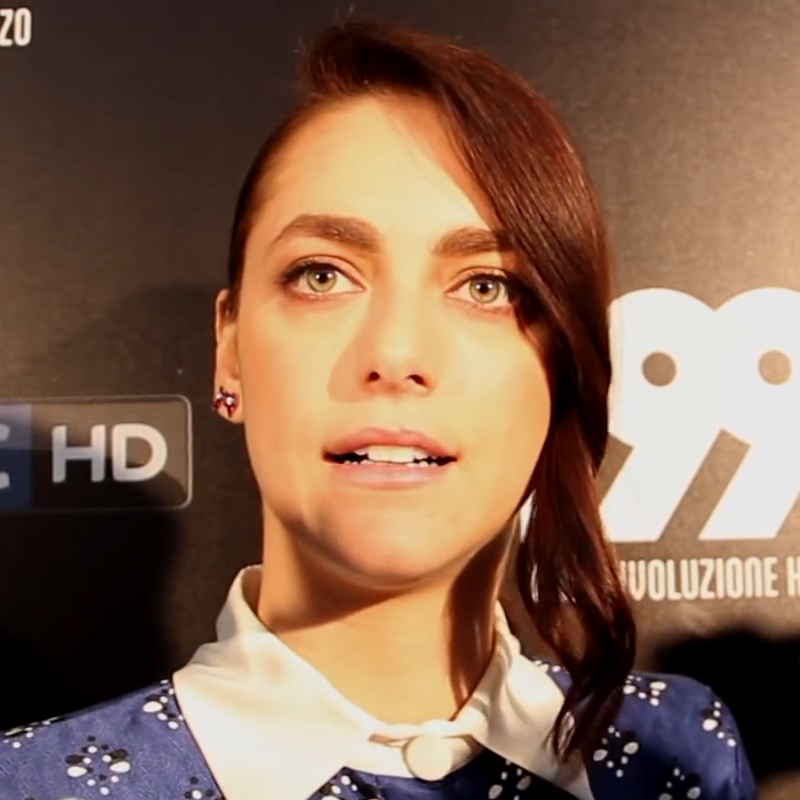
Actress Miriam Leone

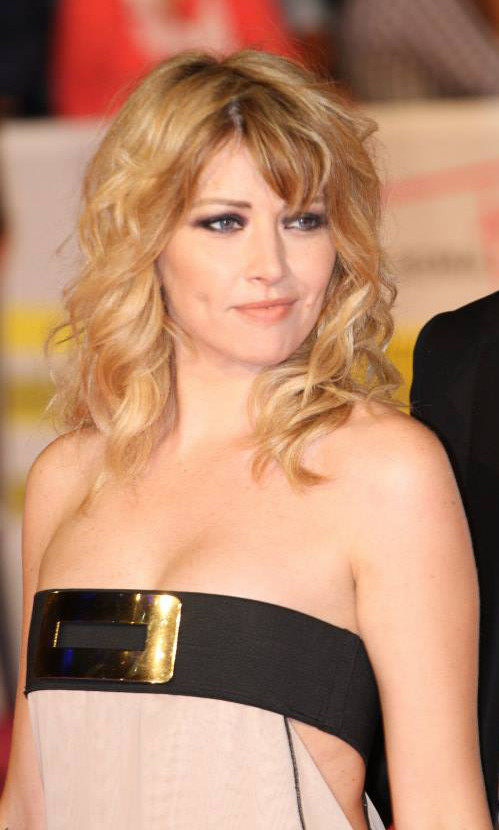
Actress Loredana Cannata

Sicilian artigiana at a presepe vivente at Santa Maria La Stella, Sicily

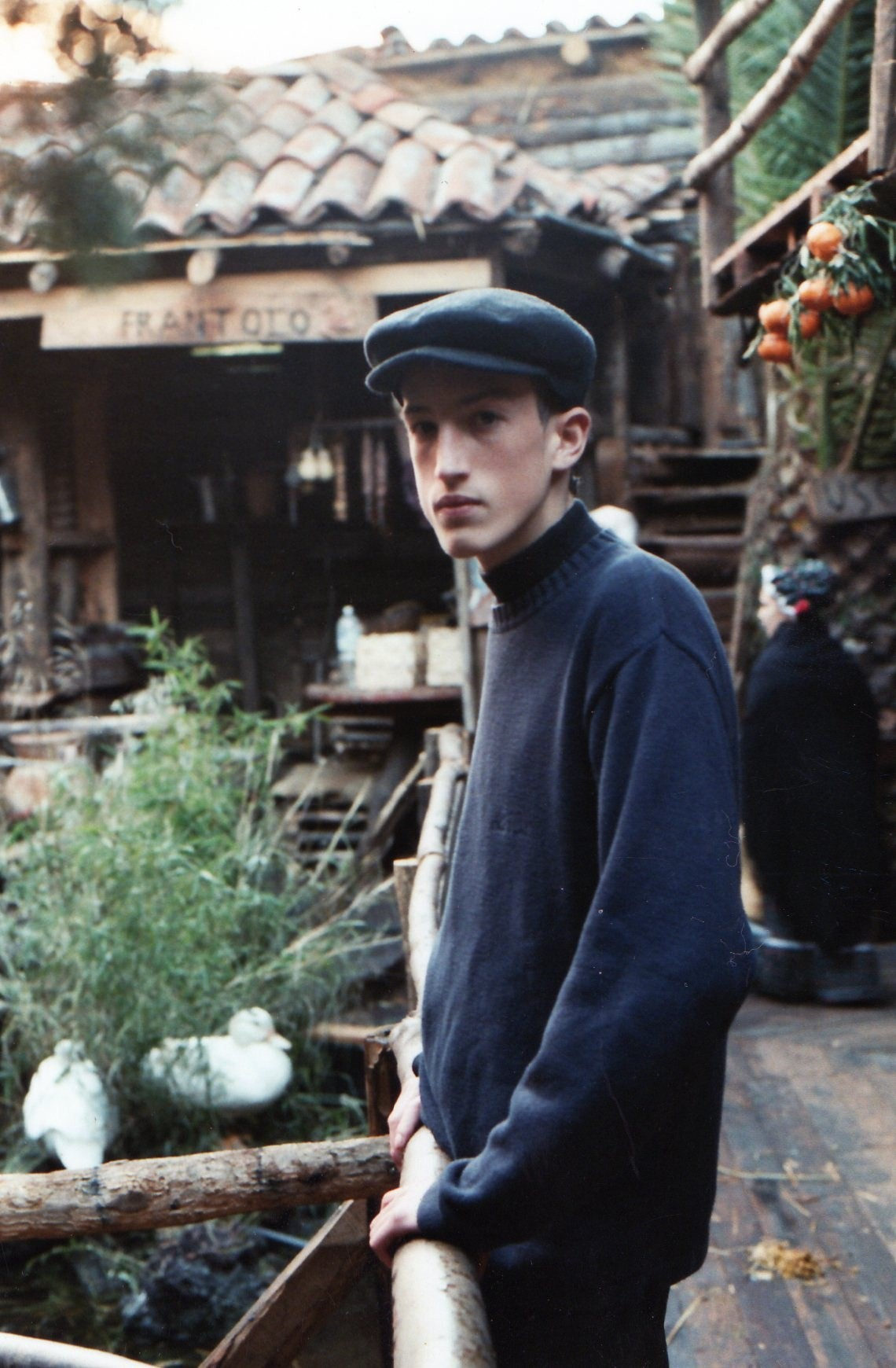
Boy in Sicilian costume of the 1880s

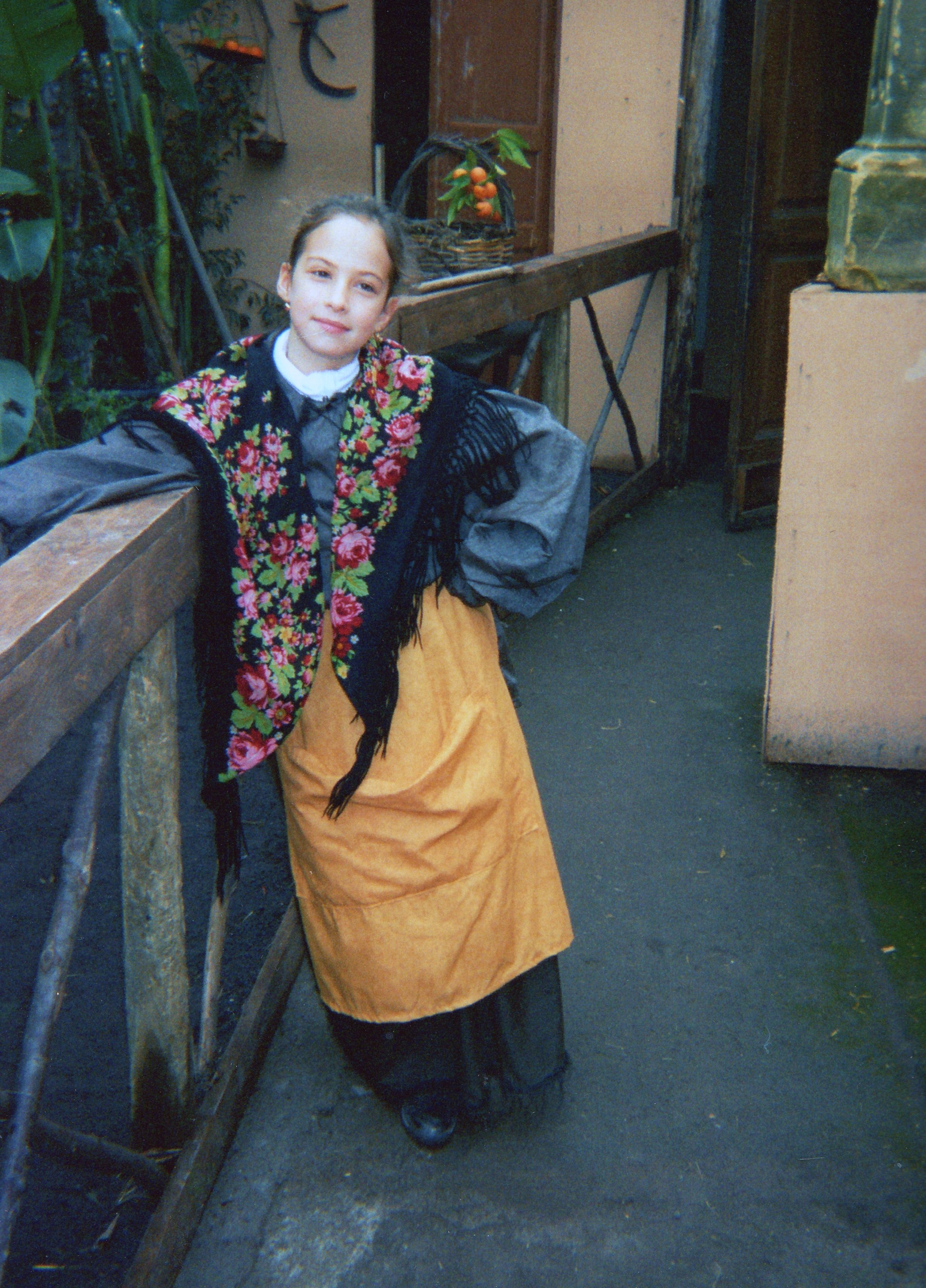
Girl wearing a costume of the 1880s period in Sicily

Sicilian cart

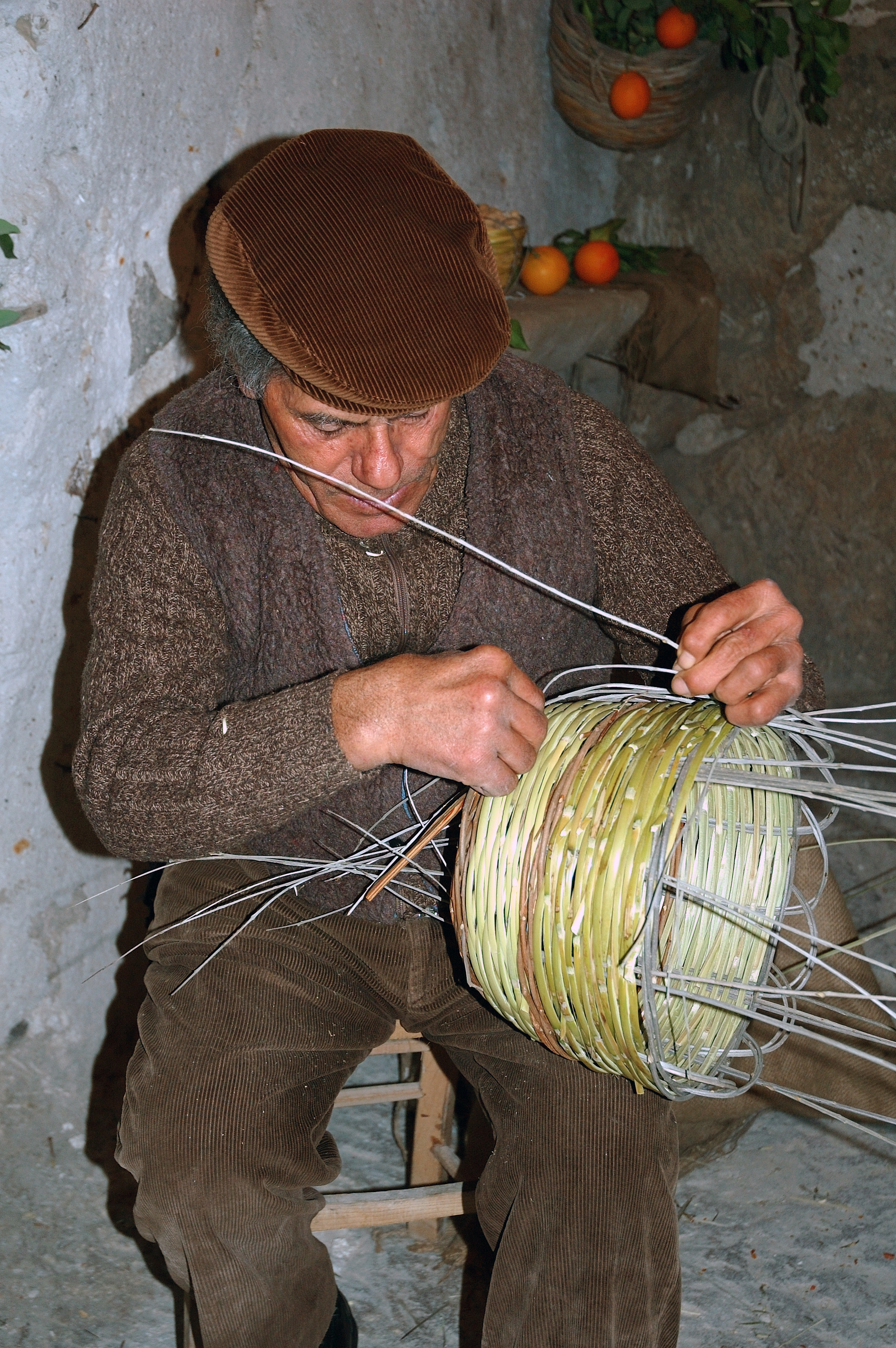
A Sicilian artisan in Sutera

Painting of Sicilian Women. Jan Frans Portaels (1818–95)

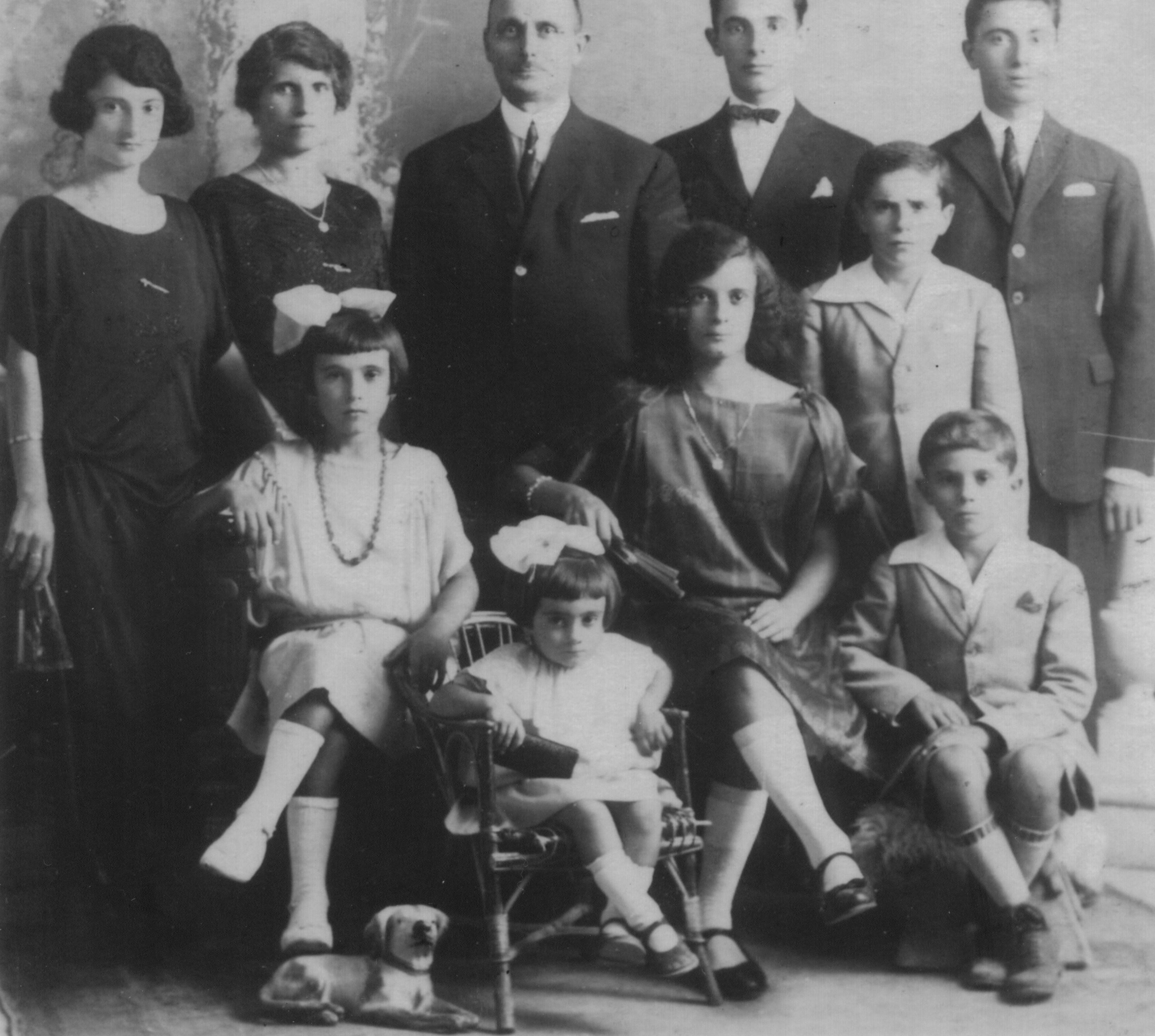
Sicilian family

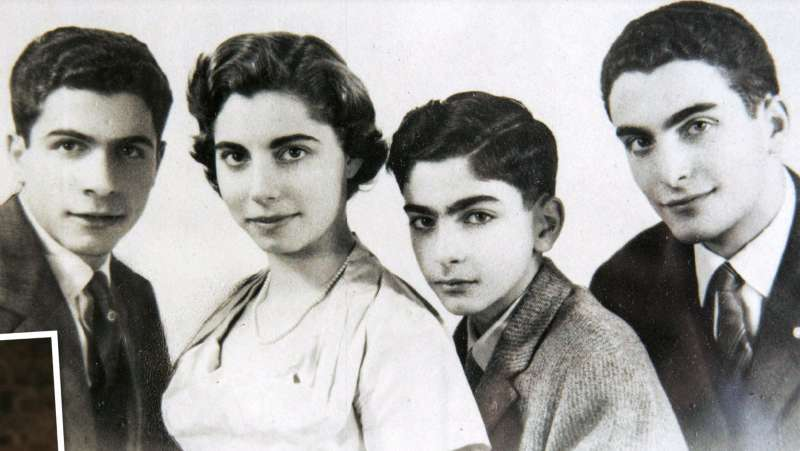
Sicilian family

== See also ==
- List of people from Sicily
- Sicilian Wars
- Normans of Sicily
- Griko people
- Maltese people

== Bibliography ==
- Benigno, Francesco; Giarrizzo, Giuseppe (1999a). Storia della Sicilia. Vol. 1. Roma-Bari: Laterza Editore. ISBN 88-421-0533-3.
- Finley, Moses Israel (2009) [1970]. Storia della Sicilia antica (8 ed.). Roma-Bari: Editori Laterza. ISBN 978-88-420-2532-0.
- Valenza, Giuseppe (2022). Il Teatro Genealogico degli Elimi nel crocevia del Mediterraneo. Marostica. ISBN 978-88-908854-2-6.
