= Filadelfio Caroniti =

Italian politician

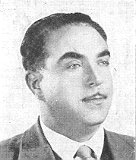
Filadelfio Caroniti

Filadelfio Caroniti (2 January 1906, San Fratello - 12 September 1979) was an Italian politician. He represented the Christian Democracy in the Chamber of Deputies from 1948 to 1953.
