= Gallo-Italic of Sicily =

Group of Gallo-Italic dialects spoken in central-eastern Sicily

- Sicilian Galloitalian; Siculo-Lombard
- Italian: Gallo-italico di Sicilia
- Native to: Sicily
- Region: Central and eastern Sicily
- Native speakers: 60,000 (2006)
- Language family: Indo-European: Italic; Latino-Faliscan; Latin; Romance; Italo-Western; Western Romance; Gallo-Iberian; Gallo-Romance; Gallo-Italic; Lombard–Piedmontese; Piedmontese; Gallo-Italic of Sicily
- Early forms: Old Latin: Vulgar Latin; Proto-Romance; Old Gallo-Romance; Old Gallo-Italic

Language codes
- ISO 639-3: –
- Glottolog: sici1250
- Gallo-Italic is classified as Definitely Endangered by the UNESCO Atlas of the World's Languages in Danger.

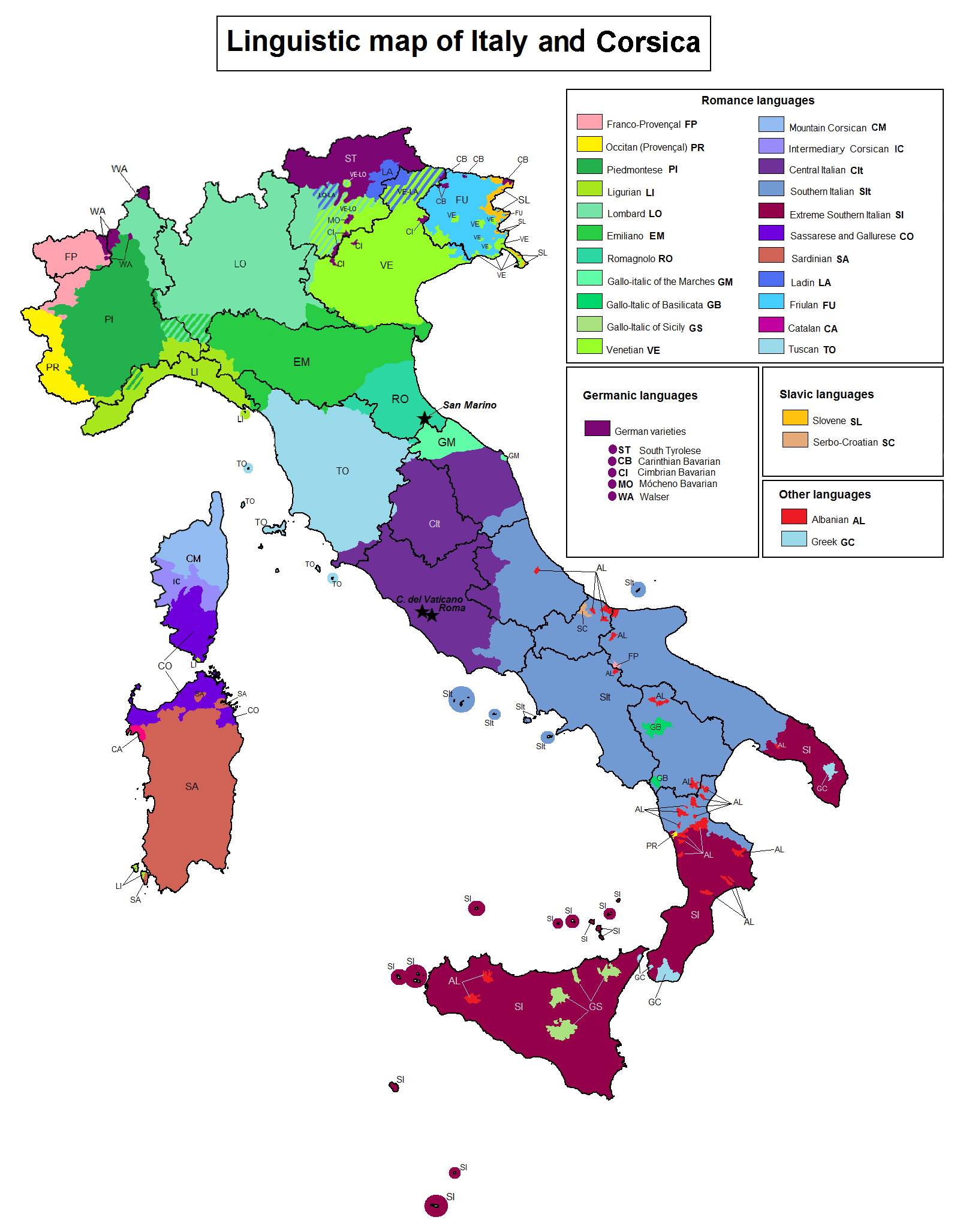
Linguistic map of Italy; Gallo-Italic of Sicily are the small, light-green areas on Sicily.

Gallo-Italic of Sicily, (Italian: Gallo-italico di Sicilia) also known as the Siculo-Lombard dialects, (Italian: Dialetti siculo-lombardi) is a group of Gallo-Italic languages found in about 15 isolated communities of central eastern Sicily. Forming a language island in the otherwise Sicilian language area, it dates back to migrations from northern Italy during the reign of Roger I, the Norman Grand Count of Sicily, and his successors.

Towns inhabited by the new immigrants became known as the "Lombard communities" (Latin: oppida Lombardorum, Sicilian: cumuna lummardi). The settlers, known as the Lombards of Sicily, actually came principally from the Aleramici fiefdoms of southern Montferrat, comprising today south-eastern Piedmont and north-western Liguria, "Lombardy" being the name for the whole of northern Italy during the Middle Ages. In addition to a common place of origin, the colonizers brought their Gallo-Italic languages. These languages added to the Gallic influence of the developing Sicilian language (influences which included Norman and Old Occitan) to become the Gallo-Italic of Sicily language family.

== History ==
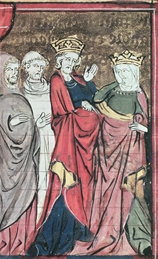
Adelaide del Vasto, third wife of Roger I of Sicily

Although Roger I took 30 years to take complete control of Sicily (from 1061 to 1091), by 1080 he had effective control of much of the island. During this conquest, some areas of central Sicily became depopulated as some, but far from all, of its Muslim population was expelled. Roger and his Norman successors encouraged migration to the region, especially by those closely allied with the Latin Church. Much of the migration was from northern Italy, particularly from his wife's family holdings in Piedmont and Liguria.

== Sample text ==
Translation of the fairy tale The Wolf and The Lamb by Phaedrus'

To get an idea of these dialects and also of the differences they present between them, we propose the reading of Phaedrus' well-known fairy tale "The Wolf and the Lamb", translated into the main Gallo-Italian dialects.

The spelling used is not that of phonetic writing, but the common spelling of Italian adapted with the following additions:

- the apostrophe ⟨'⟩ for the mid central vowel or schwa [ə].
- the hyphen ⟨-⟩ replaces the apostrophe so as not to create confusion with the schwa.
- the vowels ⟨ö⟩ and ⟨ë⟩ to make the corresponding vowels closed that tend very towards /u/ and /i/.
- ⟨ngh⟩ to make the voiced velar nasal [ŋ] in the final of the word.
- ⟨j⟩ to indicate the voiced palatal approximant [j].
- ⟨dd⟩ to make the voiced retroflex plosive [ɖ], as in Sicilian.
- ⟨sg(i)⟩ to make the voiced postalveolar fricative [ʒ], as in some Gallo-Italic varieties such as Western Lombard.

=== Text in English ===
"A wolf and a lamb, driven by thirst, had come to the same stream. The higher the wolf stopped, the lower the lamb was. Then that scoundrel, driven by his unbridled gluttony, sought a pretext for a fight. - "Why - he said - do you cloud the water I'm drinking?"
Full of fear, the lamb replied:
- Sorry, how can I do what you blame me? I drink the water that passes by you first."
And that, defeated by the evidence of the fact, said:
- Six months ago you spoke badly of me.
And the lamb replied:
- But if I wasn't born yet!
- For Hercules, it was your father, who spoke ill of me - said the wolf.
And immediately he jumped on him and tore him up until he was unjustly killed.
This fairy tale is written for those men who oppress the innocent under false pretexts.

=== Piazzese ===
'N lupu e 'n agnèu, morti d' sè, s' giungìnu a bèv ö stiss sciùm.
N-ön capp' gghj-'era u lupu, ciù sötta gghj-era l-agnèu.
Allöra dd' f'tös du lupu, ch-avèa a panza vacanta,
cum'nzà a 'nguiatèlu p' sciarrèr's cu jèu
-Oh d'sgrazià, t' ddèvi d' döcch ch' m' stè ddurdiànn tutta l-egua?
E l-aggnèu:
- Nan t' 'ns'ddiè, l-egua passa prima d' n' tì, tu ma ste ddurdiànn a mì!
U lupu, truvànn's no tört, ggh' diss:
- Oia s'ntùt ch' tu, sèi mesgi com a öra, sparràvi d' mì cu l-amisgi.
E jèu: - Ma chi stè 'ncucchiànn'?
Jè, sei mesgi fà, manch avea nasciùit!
- Butàna di guai! Allöra fu dd' bècch d' to pà a sparrèr d' mi.
E senza savèr nè ddèzz e nè scriv, cu 'na granfaggnàda su spurpà d' bedda e bedda.
Sti paröddi l-ana sènt ddi gent' ch' cunnà'nn'nu i 'nucènti 'ngiustamènt.

=== Aidonese ===
Un lup′, mort′ d′se′ e sicch′ d′ sìa,
s' truvau a b′v′rér′s ô sciùm′.
Z′rànn′ l-ugg′, vìtt′ ca nô basc′
gghj-era un gn′ddìt′ tèn′r′ e sav′rùs′.
Gghj′ fis′ p′tìt′, ma, p′ mìnt′s a post′ a cuscìnza,
z′rcàva na calùnnia p′ sciarr′iér′s.
Accuscì s′ mis′ a vusgiè.
- P′rchì m′ stai ddurdiànn′ l-eua mintr′ ìja stau b′vìnn′?
U gnedd′ scantait′, s′ r′cugghì nê robb′ e ggh′ r′spunnì:
- Tu m-aia p′rduné, ma com′ pozz′ ddurdièr′
l-eua a tìia ch′ sii′ ciù nô iaut'?
U lùp′, pùr′ r′canuscìnn′ ch-avìva tort′,
z′rcàu n-autra calùnnia e gghj′ dìss′:
- Sii misg′ com′ a ura tu m′ murmuliàv′t′!
U gn′ddìtt′ mort′ nâ pedd′ r′spunnì:
- Voss′gn′rìa iav′ tort′,
ija atànn′ manch′ ava nasciùit′!
- Buttana dû nfern′ ! Allura fu ta patr′ ch′ sparrau d′ mija!
E d′sginn′ accuscì, n-on ditt′ e un fait′,
u granfà e sû spurpà, pur′ savinn′ ch′ nan aviva curpa.
St′ parodd′ s′ l-àn-a sìnt′r cudd′
ch′ cunnàn′n′ i nuccìnt′, cusànn′l′ ngiustamint′.

=== Nicosian ===
Un lupö e n-gneu mort' d' së, avìenu r'vat' nö stissu sciumö:
chiù suva s' f'rmà u lupö, chjù sötta s' m'ttött' u gneu.
Allura ddu mascarà, ch'avia simpö famö, z'rcà na scusa p' sciarrièr's.
- P'rchì ddurdìj' l-egua ch' stagö b'vëndö?
U gneu s' cagà d' ncou du scant' e ghj' r'spundëttö:
- M' dai scusè, ma comö pozzö fë chêu tu m' sti d'sgiendo.
Iu bevo dd-egua ch' passa prima dö nda tu!
E cheö v'dëndö ch-avia torto ghj' r'spundëttö:
- Sej mis' com-ora sparrast' d' më.
Un gneu p' d'fend's ghi' dëssö.
- Ma sa iö n-avia mancu nasciò!
- Porch' d' zzà e dd' ddà; fö to paddö ch' m' mörmöriava.
E mentö d'sgia s' parodd' ghi' sautà d' ncoö e su mangià a muzz'cö.
Su cuntö è scritto p' chei
ch' vonö avera sempo rasgiöni
e ch' sâ pigghjönö co chëo ch' sö chjö deböl'.

=== Sperlinghese ===
N lupö e n gneö, pâ fortë së, s' trövanö nnô stissö vaddön;
ö lupö stasgìa nnâ partë d' d' söva, ö gneö nnâ partë d' d' söta.
Quandö ḍḍ' lupö s' v'ntià ḍḍ' pov'rö gneö,
z'rcà na scusa p' jarmè na sciarra.
- P'rchè, - ghj' dissö - m' nḍḍurdì l-egua mëntr' ca stagö b'vendö?
Ḍḍ' gn'ḍḍotö, tuttö scantà, gh' r'spöndëtö:
- Ma comö t' pozzö nḍḍurdìè l'egua se sögnö d' ḍḍ' söta?
Ö lupö, n'n savendö r'spöndö, n-v'ntà n-aöta scusa p' sciarriessë e ghj' dissö:
- Sieë mësgë ndarrìa, tu sparrastë da mi.
E ḍḍ' m'schin d' gneu r'spöndët':
- Ma ia, sieë mësgë ndarrìa, navìa manco nasciuitö!
- Allora - r'plicà ö lupö - dö to pà ca antandö sparrà d' mi.
Mancö ghiò f'nëtö d' dì cö na granfada ö chiappà e sö mangìà.
St' cuntö fö nv'ntà p' ḍḍ' ch'stiàë ca cö scusë faëzë,
ngannë e mbruoggujë s-approffìt'nö de nöcenteë.

=== Sanfratellan ===
N dauv e ng-agnieu, punturiei d' la sai, avaiu arr'vea ô stiss vadan.
Chjù n saura s-aff'rmea u dauv,
mantr ch' d-agnieu s' mies assei cchjù n giusa.
Agliàuri cau furfänt, murdù dû sa grean ptit,
zz'rchiea na scusa p-acc'm'nterlu.
P'rcò — ghj' diess — m' ntuòrbuli d-eua ch' m' stäch buvann?
Tutt scantea, d-agnieu ghj'arpunò:
- Scusa, cam pazz fer s-azzant ch' m' rr'mpruovi?
Iea bav d-eua ch' pässa prima ana sai tu.
E cau, scunfitt p' la munzagna, diess:
Siei masg fea tu pardest meu di iea.
E d-agnieu ghj-arbattò:
Ma se ancara iea n-avaia meanch anasciù!
Parch d' Giura, agliauri fu ta pätri a sparderm'.
E subt ghj' satea d'ncadd e s-u sbranea.
Sa faräbula è scritta p' quoi ch' suotamottu i nnuciant cun scusi feuzzi.

== Areas spoken ==
The languages are spoken primarily in the following areas:

- Province of Messina: Acquedolci, Montalbano Elicona, Novara di Sicilia, Fondachelli-Fantina, San Fratello and San Piero Patti
- Province of Enna: Aidone, Nicosia, Piazza Armerina and Sperlinga

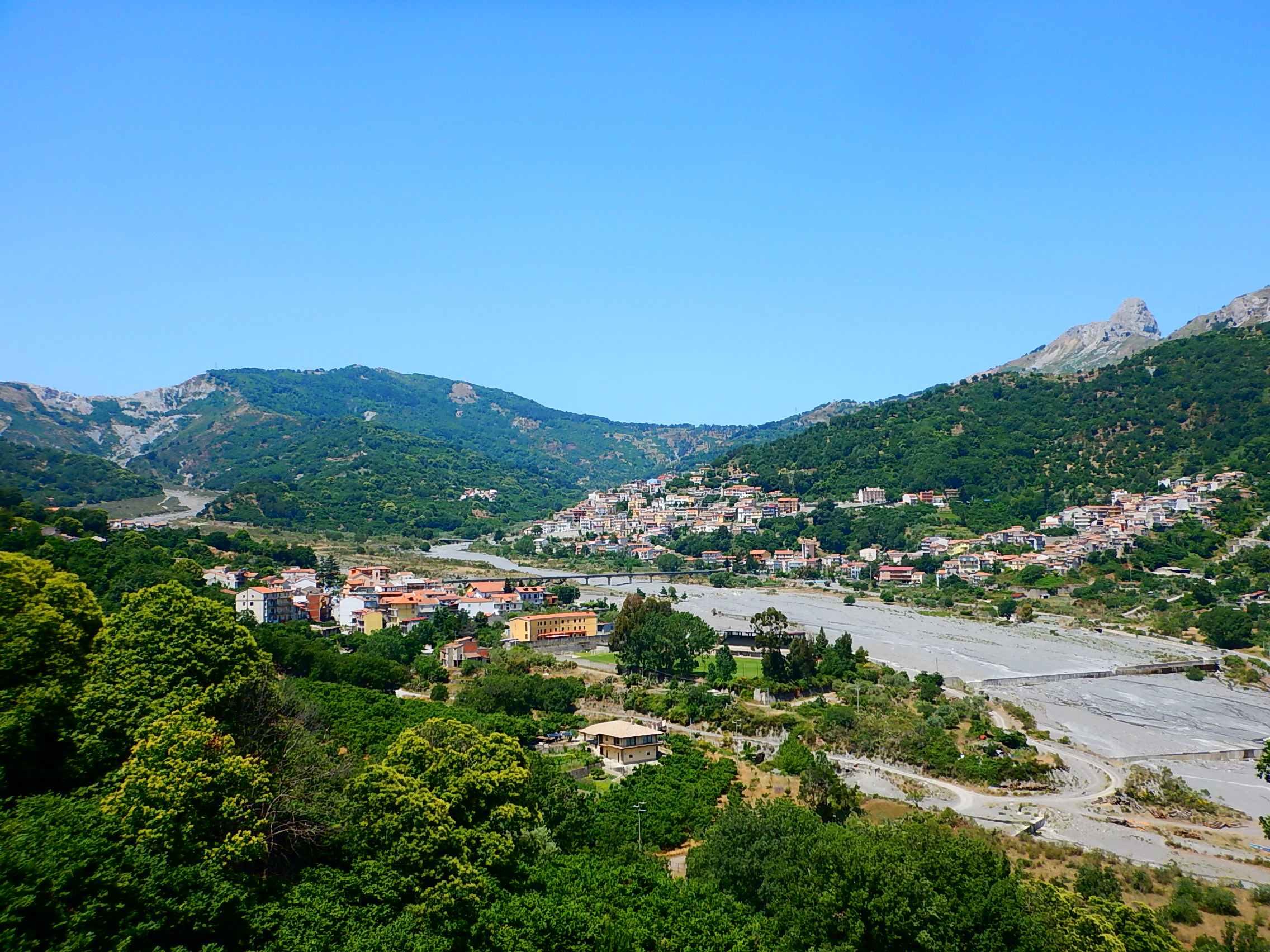
Fondachelli-Fantina, where Gallo-Italic is spoken

Other linguistic communities also existed in:

- Province of Messina: Roccella Valdemone, Motta d'Affermo and Castel di Lucio
- Province of Enna: Enna, Pietraperzia, Agira, Leonforte and Cerami
- Province of Catania: Caltagirone, Militello in Val di Catania, Mirabella Imbaccari, San Michele di Ganzaria, Paternò, Randazzo and Bronte
- Province of Syracuse: Ferla, Buccheri and Cassaro
- Province of Caltanissetta: Butera and Mazzarino
- Province of Palermo: Corleone and Vicari

In some of these towns, the northern Italian influence on the local varieties of Sicilian is marked; in others, the Lombard communities did not influence the local dialect. Similar communities have survived outside Sicily in Basilicata in southern Italy, which was subject to similar influences; the dialects spoken there are known as Gallo-Italic of Basilicata.

== Bibliography ==
- F. Piazza, Le colonie e i dialetti lombardo-siculi, Catania, 1921.
- Illuminato Peri, "La questione delle colonie lombarde di Sicilia", BSSS 57, 3-4 (1959), pp. 3–30.
- Giorgio Piccitto, "Testi aidonesi inediti o ignoti", L'Italia dialettale 25, n.s. 2 (1962), pp. 38–100.
- G. Petracco, "Influenze genovesi sulle colonie gallo-italiche delle Sicilia?", BCSic 9 (1965), pp. 106–132.
- Giovanni Tropea, Il vocabolario siciliano manoscritto inedito di Giuseppe Trischitta da Furci Siculo, in: Saggi e ricerche in memoria di Ettore Li Gatti, 3 voll. BCSic [Bollettino del Centro di studi filologici e linguistici siciliani], (Palermo) 6-8 (1962).
- IDEM, "Un dialetto moribondo, il gallo-italico di Francavilla Sicula", BCSic 9 (1965) pp. 133–152.
- IDEM, La letteralizzazione dei dialetti gallo-italici di Sicilia, in: Lingua parlata e lingua scritta, Convegno di studi 9-11 nov. 1967. BCSic 11 (1970) pp. 453–479.
- IDEM, "Effetti della simbiosi linguistica nella parlata gallo-italica di Aidone, Nicosia e Novara di Sicilia", BALI [Bollettino dell'Atlante Linguistico Italiano], n.s. 13-14 (1966), pp. 3–50.
- IDEM, Parlata locale, siciliano e lingua nazionale nelle colonie gallo-italiche della Sicilia, in: Atti del 3° Convegno Nazionale della Cultura Abruzzese; del VI Convegno del CSDI; del 948° Circolo Linguistico Fiorentino. Vol. II: Linguistica. Vol. III: Dialettologia, Pescara, Istituto di Studi Abruzzesi. Abruzzo, Rivista dell'Istituto di Studi Abruzzesi, (Pescara) 8, 1-3 (Gennaio-Dicembre 1970).
- IDEM, "Testi aidonesi inediti", Memorie dell'Istituto Lonmbardo di Scienze, Lettere e Arti, Milano, 33, 5 (1973).
- IDEM, Considerazioni sul trilinguismo della colonia galloitalica di San Fratello, in Dal dialetto alla lingua, Atti del IX Convegno per gli Studi Dialettali Italiani. Lecce, 28 settembre - 1 ottobre 1972. Pisa, Pacini, 1974.
- IDEM, "Italiano di Sicilia", L'Orizzonte, 4, Palermo, Aragne, 1976.
- IDEM, Testi sanfratellani in trascrizione fonetica, in: Vittore Pisani et alii (ed.), Italia linguistica nuova e antica. Studi linguistici in memoria di Oronzo Perlangèli, 2 vol., Università degli Studi di Bari, Facoltà di Magistero, Galatina, Congedo Editore, 1976–1978.
- IDEM, Vocabolario siciliano, fondato da Giorgio Piccitto, 4 voll. Catania-Palermo, Centro di Studi Filologici Siciliani, 1977, 1985, 1990, 1997.

== See also ==
- Lombard languages
- Western dialects of Lombard language
- Gallo-Italic of Basilicata
