= Lombards of Sicily =

Linguistic minority living in Sicily, Italy

Total population
- 65,000 (est.)

Regions with significant populations
- Italy (Sicily): 65,000 (est.)

Languages
- Gallo-Italic of Sicily, Italian

Religion
- Roman Catholic

Related ethnic groups
- Italians (Northern Italians)

Map of Italy on the eve of the arrival of the Normans. The Lombards of Sicily came to Sicily from their homeland, the Kingdom of Lombardy.

The Lombards of Sicily (Italian: Lombardi di Sicilia) are an ethnolinguistic minority living in Sicily, southern Italy, speaking an isolated variety of Gallo-Italic languages, the so-called Gallo-Italic of Sicily.

== History ==
The origins of these communities goes back to the 11th century, when soldiers and settlers from Northern Italy (at the time collectively called "Lombardy"), settled the central and eastern part of Sicily during the Norman conquest of southern Italy. After the marriage between the Norman king Roger I of Sicily with Adelaide del Vasto, member of Aleramici family, many Lombard colonisers left their homeland, in the Aleramici's possessions in Piedmont and Liguria, to settle on the island of Sicily.

The Normans began a process of 'latinization' of Sicily by encouraging an immigration policy of their people, French (Norman, Provencal and Breton) and northern Italians (in particular from Piedmont and Liguria) with the granting of lands and privileges. The aim of the new Norman kings was to strengthen the "Latin stock", which in Sicily was a minority, compared to the more numerous Greek populations.

Beginning from the end of the 11th century were repopulated the central and eastern parts of the island, the Val Demone, where there was a strong Byzantine presence and the Val di Noto, with colonists and soldiers from the Aleramici mark which included the Monferrato in Piedmont, part of the Ligurian hinterland of the west, and small portions of the western areas of Lombardy and Emilia.

The migration of people from Northern Italy to Sicily continued until the end of the 13th century. It is believed that the population of Northern Italy who immigrated to Sicily in these centuries was altogether about 200,000 people.

The major centres, called historically oppida Lombardorum, where these dialects can still be heard today, include Piazza Armerina, Aidone, Sperlinga, San Fratello, Nicosia, and Novara di Sicilia. Northern Italian dialects did not survive in some towns in the province of Catania, Syracuse and Caltanissetta that developed large Lombard communities during this period, for example Paternò and Butera. However, the Northern Italian influence in the local varieties of Sicilian are marked.

In the case of San Fratello, some linguists have suggested that the Gallic-Italic dialect present today has Provençal as its basis, having been a fort manned by Provençal mercenaries in the early decades of the Norman conquest (bearing in mind that it took the Normans 30 years to conquer the whole of the island).

== See also ==
- Western dialects of Lombard language
- Normans
- Norman conquest of southern Italy
