= San Fratello =

San Fratello San Frareau
- Comune
- Comune di San Fratello
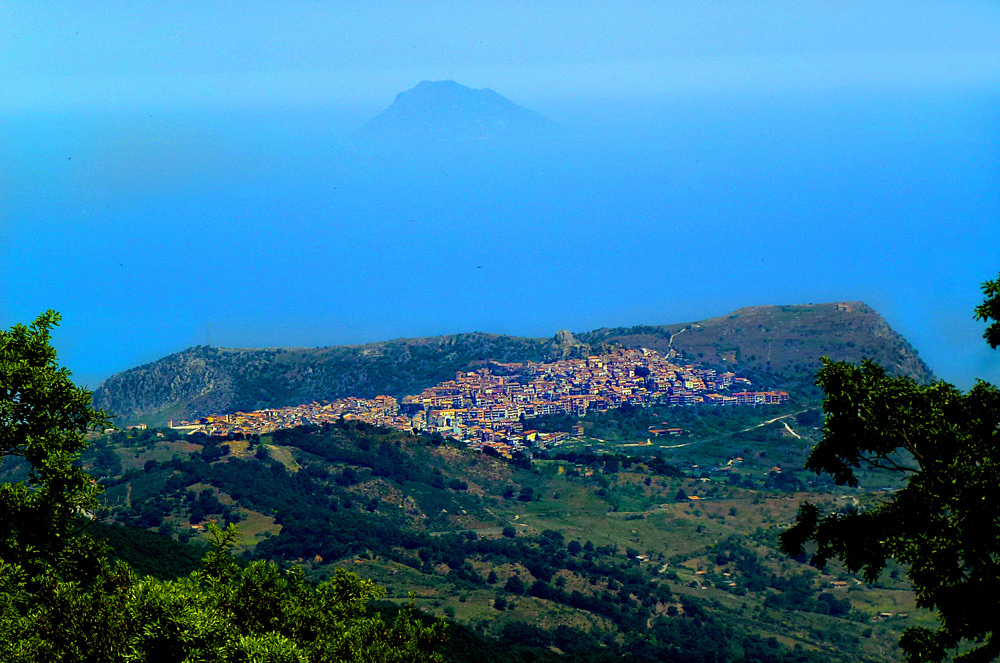
- San Fratello and Alicudi island

- Location within Italy Location within Sicily
- Coordinates: 38°1′N 14°36′E
- Country: Italy
- Region: Sicily
- Metropolitan city: Messina (ME)

Government
  - Mayor: Salvatore Sidoti Pinto

Area
  - Total: 67.63 km^{2} (26.11 sq mi)
- Elevation: 675 m (2,215 ft)

Population (30 April 2012)
  - Total: 3,894
  - Density: 57.58/km^{2} (149.1/sq mi)
- Demonym: Sanfratellani
- Time zone: UTC+1 (CET)
  - Summer (DST): UTC+2 (CEST)
- Postal code: 98075
- Dialing code: 0941
- Website: Official website

San Fratello (Gallo-Italic: San Frareau; Sicilian: Santu Frateddu), formerly San Filadelfo (Medieval Latin: Castrum S. Philadelphi; Classical Latin: Apollonia, from Greek), is a comune (municipality) in the Metropolitan City of Messina in the Italian region Sicily, located about 110 kilometres (68 mi) east of Palermo and about 90 kilometres (56 mi) west of Messina. San Fratello borders the following municipalities: Acquedolci, Alcara li Fusi, Caronia, Cesarò, Militello Rosmarino, Sant'Agata di Militello.

Its peak of population was in 1921, with 10,094. In the following decade, it lost nearly 20 percent of its population, as people migrated for work to cities and to other countries, especially the United States.

== History ==
The name of San Fratello derives from three pious brothers: Alfio, Cirino and Filadelfo. In their honour a festival is held annually on 10 May. The village was founded in the 11th century by Adelaide del Vasto, the wife of Roger I, a noble of present-day French Normandy who conquered Sicily. She came to Sicily together with colonists. They introduced their Gallo-Italic dialect, which is still spoken in the village. San Fratello is one of the so-called Oppida Lombardorum of Sicily, settlements established by the Lombards. In addition to their language, they brought Latin Christianity, which gradually replaced the Greek Byzantine Christianity and Islam.

The territory of the comune is part of the Nebrodi mountains. It has had four major landslides of record. The first was in 1754, and a second large one occurred in 1922. On 1–2 October 2009, the province of Messina suffered devastating, widespread mudslides after a sudden heavy rainstorm; scores of residents died. In February 2010, after a period of large amounts of rain in the Messina region, as a safety precaution, officials evacuated one-third of the population by 14 February. An extensive landslide soon after caused damage to homes in San Fratello and the region.

== Notable people ==
- Benedict the Moor grew up here, where he joined a Franciscan hermitage.
- Al Pacino, American actor, is a descendant through his paternal line of immigrants from San Fratello.
- The grandfather of Bettino Craxi, Italian politician, was born here.
- Filadelfio Caroniti was born here.
- Antonino Di Giorgio, Italian general and politician, Minister of War under Benito Mussolini, was born here.

== See also ==
- Lombards of Sicily
- Gallo-Italic of Sicily
- Norman conquest of Sicily
