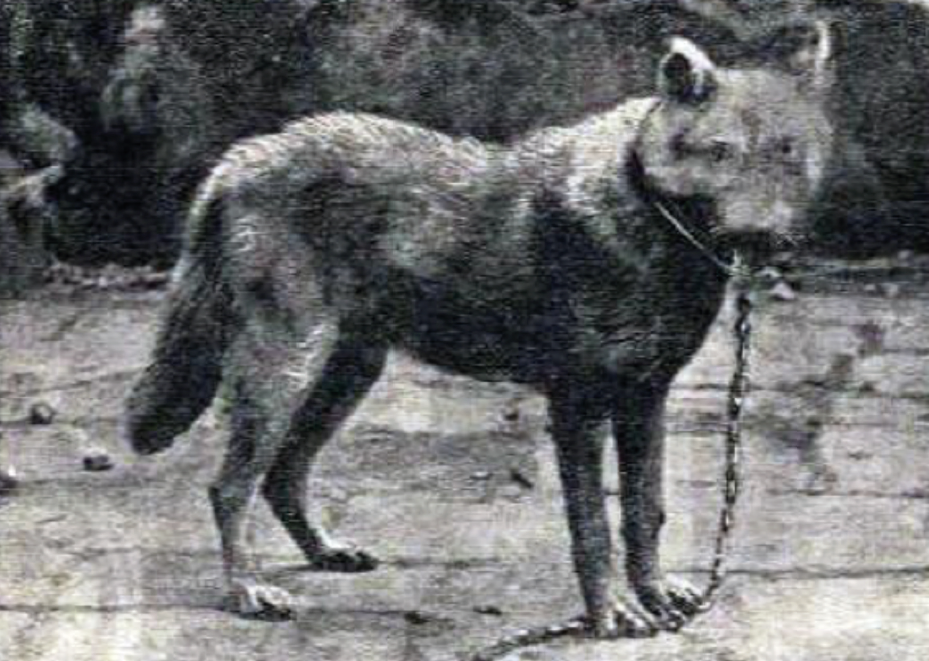
- Captive specimen in Giardino Bellini, late 19th century. This is the only extant photograph of a live Sicilian wolf.
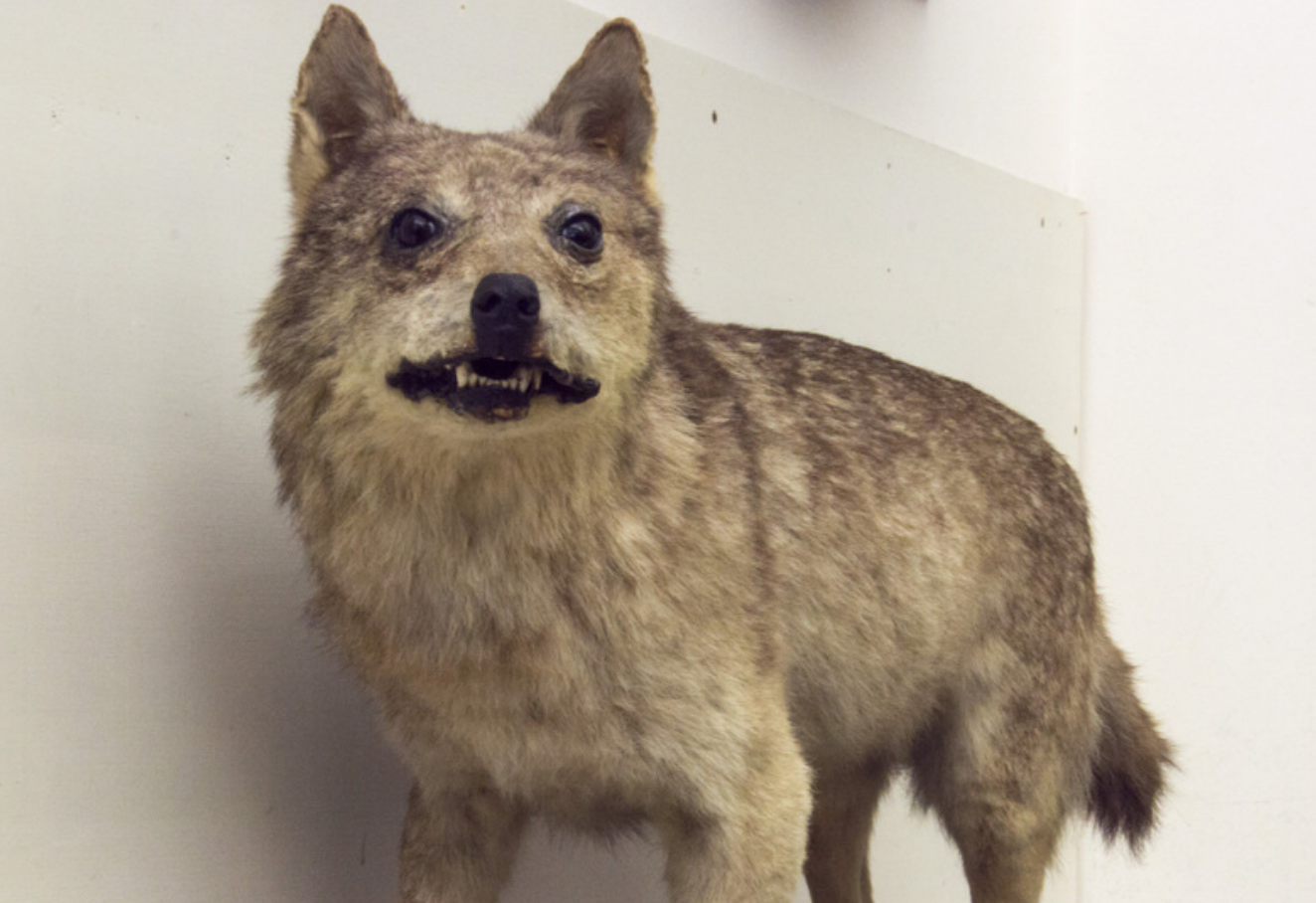
- Preserved specimen kept in the Museo di zoologia Pietro Doderlein

Conservation status
- Extinct (20th century) (IUCN 3.1)

Scientific classification
- Kingdom: Animalia
- Phylum: Chordata
- Class: Mammalia
- Order: Carnivora
- Family: Canidae
- Genus: Canis
- Species: C. lupus
- Subspecies: †C. l. cristaldii

Trinomial name
- †Canis lupus cristaldii (Angelici & Rossi 2018)
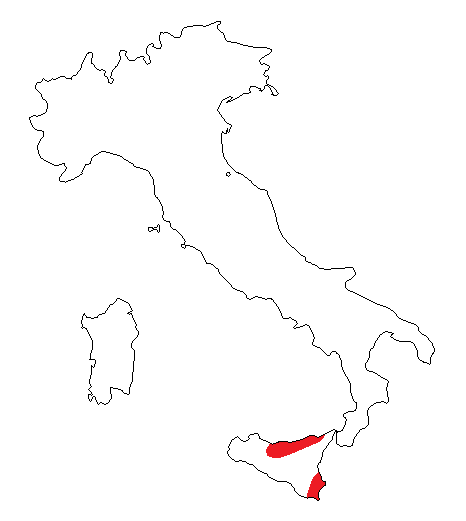
- Sicilian wolf range in 1900

= Sicilian wolf =

Extinct subspecies of gray wolf

The Sicilian wolf (Canis lupus cristaldii) is an extinct subspecies of the gray wolf that was endemic to Sicily. It was smaller than the mainland Italian wolf and had paler fur.

It colonised Sicily during the Pleistocene, together with several other large carnivorans, but it was the only one to have survived to the Holocene. The subspecies reportedly went extinct due to human persecution in the 1920s, though there were several possible sightings up to the 1970s.

It was identified as a distinct subspecies in 2018 through morphological examinations of the few remaining mounted specimens and skulls, as well as mtDNA analyses.

== Etymology ==
Its trinomial name is in honor of Italian mammalogist Mauro Cristaldi.

In Sicilian, the male is referred to as lupu, the female lupa and a pup as lupacchiu or lupacchiolu, while the terms lupazzu and lupiceddu are respectively a pejorative and a diminutive.

Regional names in Sicilian Gallo-Italic languages include dàuv in San Fratello, ddùvu in Nicosia, and lup, lùpu or suarázz in Piazza Armerina.

== Description ==
The Sicilian wolf was a slender, short-legged subspecies with light, tawny coloured fur. The dark band present on the forelimbs of the mainland Italian wolf were absent or poorly defined in the Sicilian wolf. Measurements taken from mounted museum specimens show that adults had a mean head to body length of 105.4 cm and a shoulder height of 54.6 cm, thus making them slightly smaller than the mainland Italian wolf, which measures 105.8-109.1 cm in length and 65–66.9 cm in shoulder height.

According to Francesco Minà Palumbo, the Sicilian wolf typically lived alone or in pairs in mountainous valley areas. It didn't dig its own dens, and primarily hunted during evening hours, unless hunger compelled it to hunt by day. In such cases, it would enter inhabited areas, despite fearing humans. Palumbo further described it as not particularly cunning, but ferocious when defending itself.

Its range encompassed all of Sicily, particularly Palermo, the woods surrounding Mount Etna, the Peloritani, the Nebrodi, the Madonie, the Monti Sicani and Ficuzza. It also occurred in the Erean and Hyblaean Mountains.

== History ==
=== Origin and extinction ===
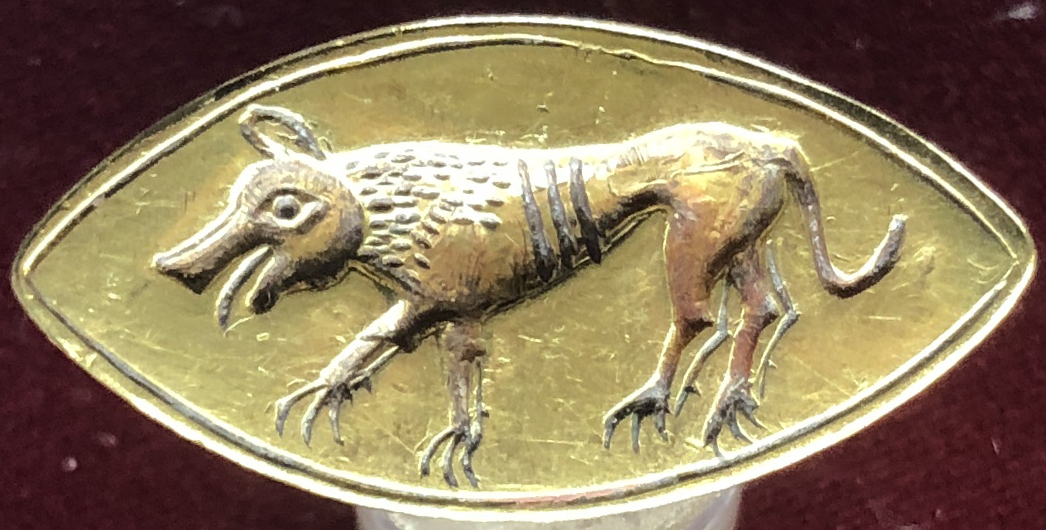
Wolf depicted on a golden signet ring from Syracuse, 800-700 B.C.

The Sicilian wolf likely entered Sicily via a land bridge that formed 21,500-20,000 years ago. An examination of skeletal remains from seven sites in northwestern Sicily dating back to the Pleistocene showed that ancient Sicilian wolves varied greatly in size and morphology by time and ecology. Specimens from the San Ciro Cave in Acquedolci were the largest, having been estimated to weigh 42 kg in life, while those in the Arena Cave assemblage in Baida near Palermo weighed 23 kg. The latter specimens were notable in having an unusual dentition indicative of a more durophagous diet or an early domestication event.

Among large carnivorans that colonised Sicily during the Pleistocene, the Sicilian wolf was the only one to have survived to the Holocene. Its decline likely began during the late Norman period, when its ungulate prey went extinct. During the 19th century, wolves were hunted for bounties: under article 26 of the royal hunting regulations, male wolves were worth five ducats, females six and pups three. This was only suspended at the end of the century. Furthermore, Palumbo wrote of some specimens sporting whitish or almost black coats, with floppy ears, woolly fur and upturned tails, traits which he hypothesised were the result of wolf-dog hybridisation. Nevertheless, it was still considered "by no means rare" in Catania and "very common" in Messina and Syracuse during the late 1890s.

The subspecies went extinct during the 20th century, but the exact date is unknown. It is generally thought that the last wolf was killed in 1924 near Bellolampo, though there are reports of further kills between 1935 and 1938, all in the vicinity of Palermo. Several sightings were also reported between 1960 and 1970.

=== Classification and genetic analyses ===
In 2018, an examination of the holotype – a mounted specimen and its skull stored at the Museo di Storia Naturale di Firenze – and three others confirmed the morphological distinctiveness of the Sicilian wolf, and an examination of the mtDNA extracted from the teeth of several skulls showed that the subspecies possessed a unique haplotype, distinct from that of the Italian wolf.

In 2019, an mDNA study indicated that the Sicilian wolf and the Italian wolf were closely related and formed an "Italian clade" that was basal to all other modern wolves except for the Himalayan wolf and the now-extinct Japanese wolf. The study indicates that a genetic divergence occurred between the two lineages 13,400 years ago. This timing is compatible with the existence of the latest land bridge between Sicily and southwestern tip of Italy, which flooded at the end of the Late Pleistocene to form the Messina Strait. Another study in 2019 confirmed that this wolf was genetically related to extant Italian and Late Pleistocene wolves, with one specimen in particular possessing a previously undetected "wolf-like" mtDNA haplotype.

In 2023, the first genomic study of museum specimens revealed that the Sicilian wolf was most closely related to Italian wolves, but also carried ancestry from ancient European dogs dating back to the Eneolithic and Bronze Age. The population showed high inbreeding and low genetic diversity, likely due to long-term isolation, with up to 50% of its genome in runs of homozygosity. Furthermore, this study suggests the Sicilian and Italian wolves shared a common ancestor that had already diverged from other European wolf lineages by 25,000–17,000 years ago. This provides a lower limit for the split among modern wolf populations. While earlier mitochondrial studies linked them to Pleistocene Siberian wolves, genomic analyses show the Sicilian wolf was not closely related to those ancient Siberian populations.

== In culture ==
Prior to its extinction, the Sicilian wolf was subject of many superstitions.

The wolf's head or skin was thought to increase the courage or strength of those who wore them, with children in Agrigento sometimes wearing wolf-skin shoes in order to grow up strong and pugnacious. Adults who wore these shoes in childhood were thought to be able to heal horses suffering from colic when riding them. Colic in horses was also cured or prevented by tying a wolf's paw to the animals' ear. A wolf skin lain out in an area where drums were played would cause the instruments to break, and a wolf's tendon or paw, when sewn into clothing around the waist, was believed to soothe abdominal pains. An animal bitten by a wolf was said to become allupatu and thus immune to pain.

The gaze of a wolf was thought to cause muteness or catatonia, a condition known as ligatu, thus hunters would strive to kill a wolf before it had an opportunity to see its attacker. To prevent themselves from being seen by wolves, hunters and shepherds would carry drapery called abbràciu, which was said to shield them from the wolves' eyes when sleeping outdoors.

The Sicilian wolf gave its name to the sawn-off shotgun of the Sicilian Mafia, the lupara, which translates to "for the wolf" and was originally used in wolf hunting.
