= Santa Maria di Gesù =

Santa Maria di Gesù may refer to the following Italian churches:

- Santa Maria di Gesù, Alcamo, Trapani, Sicily
- Santa Maria di Gesù, Caltagirone, Sicily
- Santa Maria di Gesù, Catania, Sicily
- Santa Maria di Gesù, Vizzini, Sicily

== See also ==
- Santa Maria di Gesù al Capo, a church in Palermo, Sicily, Italy
- Santa Maria di Gesù family, a Sicilian Mafia crime syndicate
