= Agosta =

Agosta is an Italian surname. Notable people with the name include:

- Cristoforo Agosta, 16th/17th-century Italian Mannerist painter
- Dustin Agosta, American drag queen known as "Discord Addams"
- Marc Agosta (born 1948), Luxembourgish long-distance runner and Olympian
- Matteo Agosta (1922–1964), Italian politician
- Meghan Agosta (born 1987), Canadian ice hockey player

== See also ==
- Agosta, Lazio, a commune in the Province of Rome, Italy
- Agosta-class submarine, a French-built class of diesel-electric attack submarines
- French submarine Agosta, more than one submarine of the French Navy
