= Bob campaign =

Drink driving awareness campaign

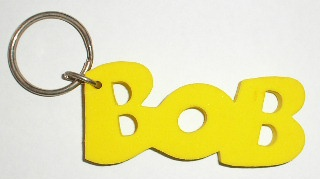
The BOB-campaign keyring

The Bob campaign aims to raise awareness of the dangers of drink-driving; drivers with high blood alcohol content are at increased risk of car accidents, highway injuries and vehicular deaths. Alongside the general information that is offered during the campaign, there is an increased police surveillance, especially during the weeks running up to Christmas and New Year's Eve. Most of all, the campaign focuses on a designated driver approach.

The Bob campaign originated in Belgium, in 1995, and the concept has been picked up in the Netherlands, France (but with Sam, In France) in 2006, Germany in 2007 and also Luxembourg, with every country adapting the formula to their audience.

Some media have spread the rumor that the acronym is derived from the Dutch phrase "Bewust Onbeschonken Bestuurder" which translates to "Consciously Non-Drunk Driver" or 'deliberately sober driver'. Many people have since believed that this is true, but Bob is actually the nickname of Robert Madrenas, who created the Magnésium advertising agency which launched that campaign.

== History ==
The Bob campaign originated in Belgium, in 1995, in a collaboration between several governmental departments, the police and the Belgian beer brewing industry.

The campaign appeared to be successful right from the start. In just a few weeks time, 4 out of 5 Belgians had heard about Bob. Now, 97% of the Belgian population knows about the campaign, with Bob becoming the symbol against drinking and driving.

To date, more than 37% of all drivers in Belgium claim to have offered to be a designated driver. 34% have actually been a designated driver and 46% have been driven home safely by their 'Bob'.

According to official figures, the Bob campaign has triggered a change in mentality. Nowadays 80% of the population considers drinking and driving to be unacceptable.

== See also ==
- Alcohol advertising campaigns
- Drunk driving (USA)
