= Vizzini =

- Comune
- Comune di Vizzini
- Panorama of Vizzini

- Coat of arms

- Location within Italy Location within Sicily
- Coordinates: 37°10′N 14°45′E
- Country: Italy
- Region: Sicily
- Metropolitan city: Catania (CT)
- Frazioni: Camemi, Vizzini Scalo

Government
  - Mayor: Salvatore Ferraro

Area
  - Total: 125 km^{2} (48 sq mi)
- Elevation: 586 m (1,923 ft)

Population (2018-01-01)
  - Total: 6,330
  - Density: 50.6/km^{2} (131/sq mi)
- Demonym: Vizzinesi
- Time zone: UTC+1 (CET)
  - Summer (DST): UTC+2 (CEST)
- Postal code: 95049
- Dialing code: 0933
- Patron saint: St. Gregory
- Saint day: 12 March
- Website: Official website

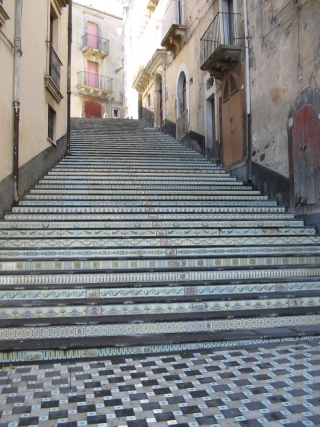
Salita Lucio Marineo.

Vizzini is a town and comune in the Metropolitan City of Catania, on the island of Sicily, southern Italy. It is located 60 kilometres (37 mi) from Catania in the Hyblaean Mountains, on the most northwesterly slopes of Monte Lauro.

The commune territory is bounded by the comuni of Buccheri, Francofonte, Giarratana, Licodia Eubea, Militello in Val di Catania, Mineo.

== History ==
Bidis, a Roman city mentioned by Pliny and Cicero, stood here in a territory that has been inhabited since prehistoric times.

The modern town developed in the Middle Ages around a now non-extant castle, as a fief of various lords, including the Chiaromontes and the Schittinos, although for many years it was also part of the royal domain.

In 1358, Roland of Sicily reconquered the area from Vizzini to Avola.

In 1415, the Jewish community of Vizzini was expelled by Queen Blanca, and was never permitted to return.

On July 14, 1943, the town of Vizzini was liberated from fascist forces by the British military. Specifically, by that time Vizzini was occupied by a small detachment of forces from Nazi Germany. Britain's XXX Corps under General Montgomery consisting largely of M4 Sherman Tanks easily overpowered the small group of German tanks that were present in the town. The town had been in the American occupational zone and this caused some confusion when British forces liberated the town first.

== Main sights ==
The Arab layout of the town is evident seen passing from Via Verga to Via San Gregorio Magno and proceeding as far as Largo della Matrice, a square with a modern statue of St Gregory in the middle and the Chiesa Madre (mother church) of San Gregorio Magno at one side.

The portal on the left flank of the church, in splendid 15th-century Gothic-Catalan style, probably derived from the old Town Hall, destroyed by the earthquake in 1693; in the interior there are late 18th century stuccos and a wooden ceiling by Natale Bonaiuto, as well as two paintings (The Martyrdom of St. Laurence and the Madonna delle Mercede) by Filippo Paladini (or Paladino), born in Florence about 1544. Another painting by Paladino, The Deposition (1607), is in the Chiesa del Convento dei Cappuccini.

Nearby is the church of Sant'Agata, rebuilt in the 18th century on the site of a previous 15th-century building and houses a pipe organ created around 1770.

The church of San Giovanni Battista was built in the 18th century. The stuccos decorating the interior are by Natale Bonaiuto.

The front of the church of Santa Teresa is said to be the setting for scenes from Cavalleria Rusticana, the libretto of which is based on the play of the same name by Giovanni Verga, who lived in Vizzini for a time.

The statue depicting the Madonna and Child (1527) in the Chiesa dei Minori Osservanti was sculpted by Antonello Gagini.

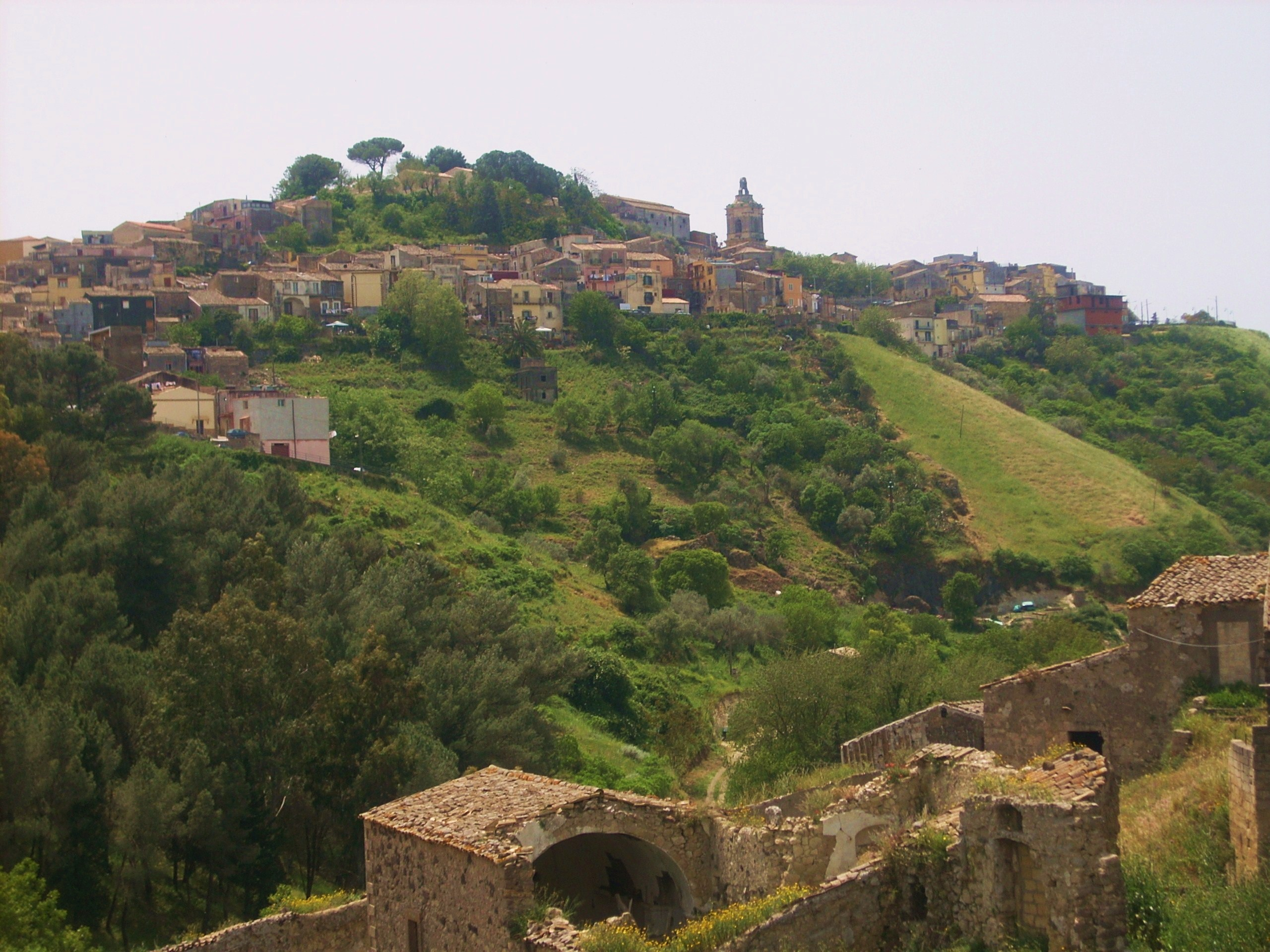
View of Vizzini from the valley below

=== Religious buildings ===
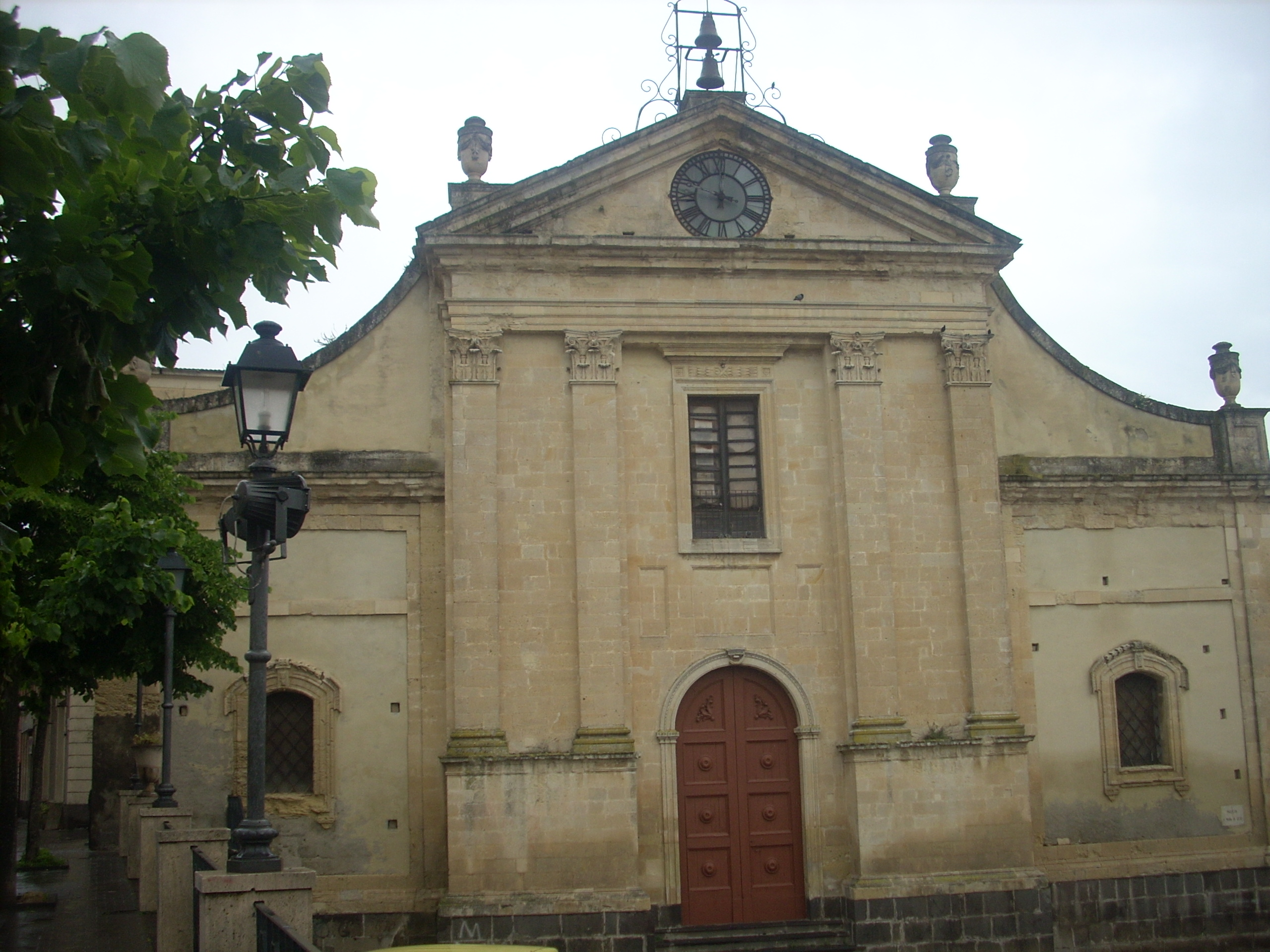
Chiesa di Santa Maria di Gesù. Original 13th-century church was severely damaged in the 1693 earthquake and rebuilt in the Baroque style

- San Gregorio Magno, chiesa madre.
- Chiesa dello Spirito Santo
- Santa Maria di Gesù and convent
- San Vito
- Santissima Annunziata
- San Francesco di Paola
- Santa Maria del Pericolo
- San Sebastiano
- Santa Teresa
- Sant'Agata
- Chiesa del Convento dei Cappuccini
- Monastero Santa Maria dei Greci
- Santa Lucia

Palazzo di città (municipio Building).

=== Palaces and other buildings ===
- Palazzo di Citta (early 19th century)
- Palazzo Verga (family of the writer)(18th century)
- Palazzo di città (municipio)(Town Hall Building)
- Palazzo Cannizzaro
- Palazzo Passanisi
- Palazzo Cafici
- Palazzo La Gurna
- Palazzo Trao
- Palazzo Gandolfo Maggiore

== Culture ==
The writer Giovanni Verga used Vizzini as the setting for his Cavalleria Rusticana and Mastro Don Gesualdo, describing places and scenes that are still recognizable (the prickly pears of Cunziria, and in a sloping alley the house of the Trao family).

== People ==
- Giovanni Verga (1840–1922), Italian realist writer.
- Lucio Marineo Siculo (1444–1533). Humanists Scholar at the University of Salamanca, Spain, teacher of translating Italian love poetry, Latin, and Greek lyrics into Spanish. Lived in the court of the Spanish kings Ferdinand and Isabel where he taught Joan Boscà i Almogàver.
- Matteo Agosta (1922–1964) was an Italian politician who represented the Christian Democracy party in the Chamber of Deputies from 1958 to 1964.

== Economy ==
The economy of the commune is mainly agricultural (cereals, prickly pears, vegetables, sumac). Other activities include handmade shoes and carpentry.

== Transportation ==
Buses travel to and near Vizzini regularly from surrounding cities Catania and Ragusa. Major operators include AST and ETNA.

The railway station Vizzini-Licodia is situated 6 km outside the city in the frazione of Vizzini Scalo.

== Events ==
- Procession of "Sorrows" – Good Friday
- "A Cugnunta" – Easter Sunday
- "Ricotta and Cheese Festival" – 23, 24 and 25 April
- Festival of San Giuseppe – 19 April
- "Festival of Taste and Odours" – 2 June
- Festival of San Giovanni Battista – 28 and 29 August
- Events Verghiane – July / August
- Festival of the Patron San Gregorio Magno – 2 and 3 September
- "Rocksticana " – Rock music festival for emerging groups – September
- Traditional "Festival of the Dead" – 30–31 October and 1 November
- "Living Nativity" – December

== See also ==
- Allied invasion of Sicily – during the Second World War Vizzini was captured on 14 July 1943.
- Di Blasi Industriale – is an Italian manufacturer of folding bicycles, tricycles, mopeds and scooter based in Vizzini, Sicily.

== Twin towns ==
- Cerignola, Italy
- Aci Catena, Italy
- Livorno, Italy
