= Lago di Nicito =

Lake in Catania, Sicily, Italy

- Lake Nicito
- Location within Sicily
- Location: Province of Catania, Sicily
- Coordinates: 37°30′30″N 15°04′46″E
- Type: Historic volcanogenic lake
- Primary inflows: Amenano
- Primary outflows: Amenano
- Basin countries: Italy
- Max. depth: 15 m (49 ft)
- Shore length^{1}: 6 km (3.7 mi)
- Settlements: Catania
- ^{1} Shore length is not a well-defined measure.

Lago di Nicito (Lake Nicito) was a lava-dammed lake in the Province of Catania, Sicily, Italy from the 5th to 17th century CE.

== Formation ==
Lago di Nicito formed following a 5th-century CE eruption of Mount Etna, when the river Amenano was diverted and dammed by lava flows and volcanic debris. The eruption caused a diversion near the piazza Santa Maria di Gesù. The lake had a circumference of approx. 6km, with a peak depth of approx. 15m. The ancient road via Lago di Nicito is used to approximate the historic shoreline. A later eruption of Etna in 1669 CE filled the basin with lava within 6 hours.

== Uses ==
Residents utilized the lake for economic activities such as fishing and trading, as well as for recreation, such as boat racing and other high-society activities.
