= NightRiders, Incorporated =

- Company type: Private
- Industry: Designated driver services / Transportation
- Founded: July 2001
- Founder: Gary Calnan, Brad Dickerhofe, Carl Grodnik
- Defunct: 2005
- Fate: Closed
- Headquarters: Boulder, Colorado, United States
- Area served: Boulder and Denver, Colorado
- Key people: Gary Calnan, Brad Dickerhofe, Carl Grodnik
- Products: Designated-driver-for-hire service using collapsible scooters
- Services: Transportation of customers in their own vehicles

NightRiders, Incorporated was the first U.S. designated-driver-for-hire service to use collapsible motor scooters, also known as monkey bikes.

== History ==
Gary Calnan, Brad Dickerhofe, and Carl Grodnik founded NightRiders in July 2001 in Boulder, Colorado. In 2004 the company opened a new operation in the state capital of Denver. Before closing its operational doors in 2005, NightRiders earned strong community acceptance as well as garnering a great deal of national media coverage including from TIME Magazine, Inc. Magazine, NBC's The Today Show, Dateline NBC and United In-Flight programming. Multiple competitor-companies started in the Denver Metro region following NightRiders, often mimicking the company's unique operating and marketing styles.

In August 2005, NightRiders endeavored to expand their concept of driving people home in their own cars. They planned and executed the NightRiders "Ride to END Drunk Driving" Campaign, riding ten (10) collapsible scooters across the United States, from Boulder, Colorado to New York City, demonstrating the company's service to communities along the way. The ride was filmed and edited by 42 Productions and is currently in the process of being marketed to various television networks, targeting Discovery Communications, specifically aiming toward the Discovery Channel, TLC, and the Travel Channel.

NightRiders is no longer in business, according to their corporate website.

== Business model ==
NightRiders, Incorporated was a traditional "C" corporation funded with private investment. Essentially, it utilized a model that allowed customers to pay for a designated driver. The business employed drivers equipped with collapsible, motorized scooters. The drivers drove customers home in their own vehicles, stowing the scooters in the customer's trunk. Upon arrival to the customer's destination, the driver collected the fare, assembled the scooter, and rode off to the next customer.

== Awards & media coverage ==
- TIME magazine - January 17, 2005 - "And One More For The Road"
- Inc. Magazine - March 2005 - "Five Ideas to Watch"
- 2005 - Innovation Quotient Award from the Boulder County Business Report
- 2004 - Platinum Key of Life Award from Doctors for Designated Driving
- 2003 - Corporate Leadership Award from the National Commission Against Drunk Driving
