= Benedict the Moor =

Christian saint

Saint Benedict the Moor OFM
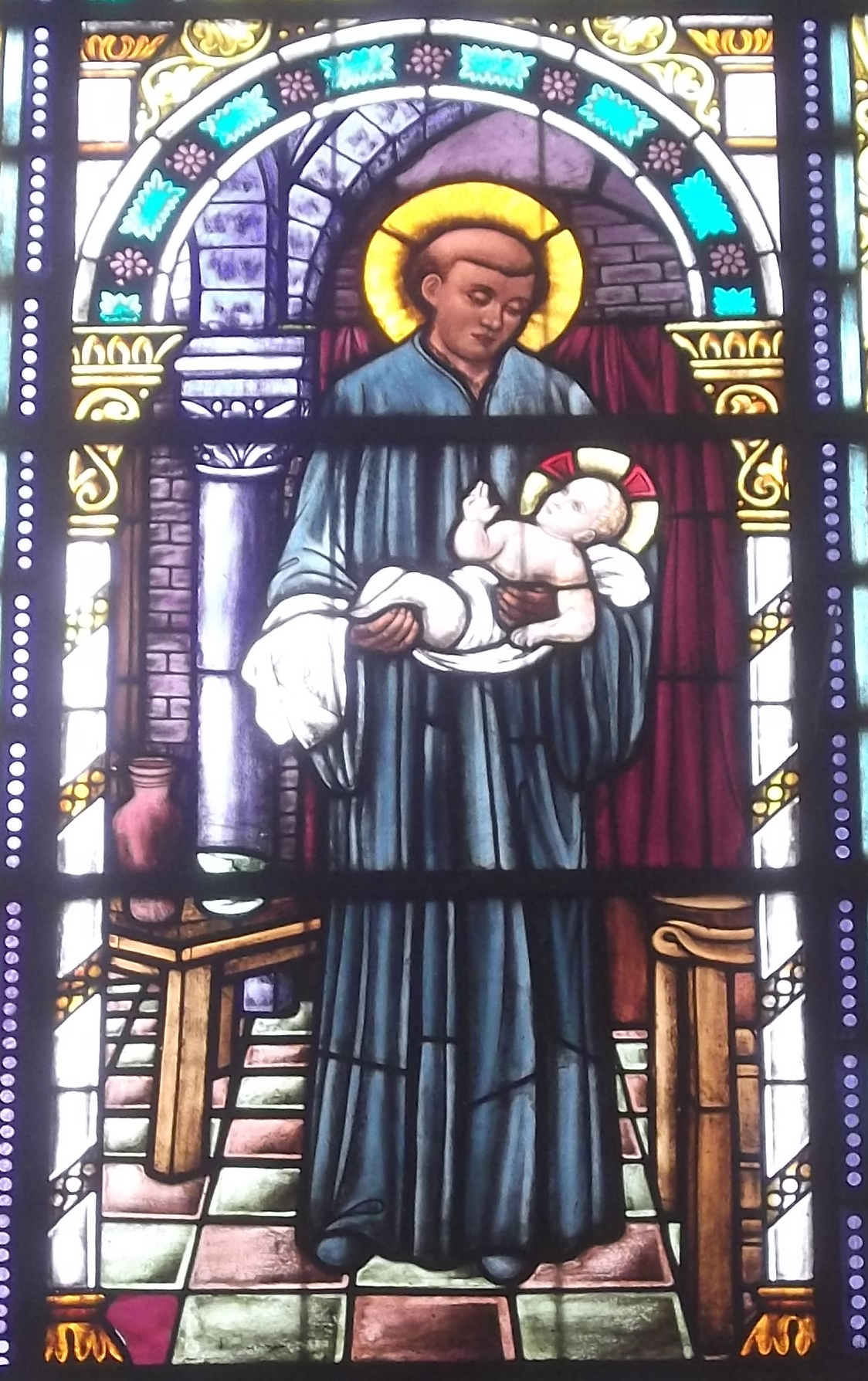
- Stained glass of Saint Benedict the Moor, inside of the Capela do Divino Espírito Santo, Porto Alegre, Brazil.

Religious and confessor
- Born: 1526; San Fratello, Messina, Sicily, Crown of Aragon
- Died: 4 April 1589 (aged 62–63); Palermo, Sicily, Crown of Aragon
- Venerated in: Catholic Church (Sicily and the Franciscan Order); Lutheranism
- Beatified: 1734 by Pope Benedict XIV
- Canonized: 24 May 1807 by Pope Pius VII
- Major shrine: Convent of Santa Maria di Gesù al Capo, Palermo, Italy
- Feast: 4 April (3 April in the Franciscan Order and 5 October in Brazil)
- Patronage: African missions; African Americans; black missions; black people; Palermo; San Fratello; Acquedolci; Sicily

Benedict the Moor OFM (Italian: Benedetto il Moro; 1526 – 4 April 1589), also known as Benedict of Palermo, Benedict the Black, or Benedict the African, was an Afro-Sicilian Franciscan friar. He was born to enslaved Africans in San Fratello, Sicily and freed at birth. He became known for his charity.

As a young man, he joined a Franciscan-affiliated hermit group, of which he became the leader. In 1564 he was sent to the Franciscan friary in Palermo, where he continued good works. He died in 1589 and was canonized by Pope Pius VII in 1807.

== Life ==
Benedict was born to Cristoforo and Diana Manasseri, Africans who were taken as slaves in the early 16th century to San Fratello (also known as San Fradello or San Philadelphio), a small town near Messina, Sicily. They were given Italian names, and later converted to Christianity. The Italian "il Moro" for "the dark-skinned" has been interpreted as referring to Moorish heritage. Because of his appearance, Benedict was also called Æthiops or Niger (both referring to black skin color and not the modern-day countries).

Benedict's parents were granted freedom for their son before his birth because of their "loyal service". Like most peasants, Benedict did not attend any school and was illiterate. During his youth, he worked as a shepherd and was quick to give what he had earned to the poor. When he was 21 years old, he was publicly insulted for his color. His forbearance at this time was noted by the leader of an independent group of hermits on nearby Monte Pellegrino, who followed the Rule for hermit life written by Francis of Assisi. Benedict was quickly invited to join that community, and shortly thereafter he gave up all his earthly possessions and joined them. He served as the cook for the community and at the age of twenty-eight succeeded Jerome Lanze as leader of the group.

In 1564 Pope Pius IV disbanded independent communities of hermits, ordering them to attach themselves to an established religious Order, in this case, the Order of Friars Minor. Once a friar of the Order, Benedict was assigned to Palermo to the Franciscan Friary of St. Mary of Jesus. He started at the friary as a cook, but was soon appointed as the master of novices, and later as Guardian of the community, although he was a lay brother rather than a priest, and was illiterate.

Benedict accepted the promotion, and successfully helped the order adopt a stricter version of the Franciscan Rule. He was widely respected for his deep, intuitive understanding of theology and scripture, and was often sought for counseling. He also had a reputation as a healer of the sick. Combined, these characteristics continued to draw many visitors to him. As he enjoyed cooking, he returned to kitchen duty in his later years.

Benedict died at the age of 65 and, it is claimed, on the very day and hour which he had predicted. At the entrance of his cell in the Franciscan friary of St. Mary of Jesus there is a plaque with the inscription: "This is the cell where Saint Benedict lived", and the dates of his birth and death – 1524 and 1589. Other sources list the year of his birth as 1526.

Upon his death, King Philip III of Spain ordered the construction of a magnificent tomb to house his remains in the friary church.

== Veneration ==
Benedict was beatified by Pope Benedict XIV in 1743 and canonized in 1807 by Pope Pius VII. It is claimed that his body was found incorrupt upon exhumation a few years later. His major shrine was located at the Convent of Santa Maria di Gesù al Capo in Palermo. The church and his relics were largely destroyed during the 2023 Italian wildfires.

Benedict is remembered for his patience and understanding when confronted with racial prejudice and taunts. He was declared a patron saint of African Americans, along with the Dominican lay brother Martin de Porres.

=== America ===
At least seven historically Black Catholic parishes in the United States, bear or bore his name, including but not limited to the following cities:

Parish name	Diocese	Location	Canonically established
St. Benedict the Moor	Archdiocese of Washington	Washington, D.C.	1946
St. Benedict the Moor	Archdiocese of New York	New York City	
St. Benedict the Moor	Archdiocese of Cincinnati	West Dayton, Dayton, Ohio	2005/2020
St. Bonaventure - St. Benedict the Moor	Diocese of Brooklyn	Jamaica, Queens, New York City	1932
St. Benedict the Moor	Diocese of Pittsburgh	Pittsburgh, Pennsylvania	1889/2020
St. Benedict the African	Archdiocese of Chicago	Englewood, Chicago, Illinois	1989/2016
St. Benedict The Black	Diocese of Shreveport	Grambling, Louisiana	
St. Benedict the Moor	Diocese of Baton Rouge	Bertrandville, Plaquemines Parish, Louisiana	1911
St Benedict the Moor	Diocese of Savannah	Savannah, Georgia	1888
St. Benedict the Moor Mission	Archdiocese of San Francisco	San Francisco, California	1928

The church in Dayton was established in 2003 under the leadership of Fr Francis Tandoh, a priest from Ghana. The parish maintains a ministry to natives of that country, as well as parishioners from two previous parishes merged to form it.

St. Benedict the Moor Catholic Church, established in 1874 and located in the Historical District of Savannah, Georgia, is the oldest Catholic Church for African Americans in Georgia, and one of the oldest in the Southeastern United States. Churches named for him have also been founded in Columbus, Georgia and St. Augustine, Florida.

Veneration of Benedict is spread throughout Latin America, from Mexico through Argentina. In Venezuela, particularly, his devotion is spread through the country's various states, and he is celebrated on many different dates, according to the local traditions.

Saint Benedict is popular in Brazil for being a Black saint, the son of enslaved Africans, whose humble and virtuous life made him a symbol of faith, resistance, and dignity for Afro-descendants, especially during and after the period of slavery. Representing the poor and marginalized, he became known as the patron of cooks and humble causes, and is widely venerated in Black communities, popular festivals, and religious brotherhoods. His image strengthened the religious and cultural identity of African descendants in a country deeply marked by the legacy of slavery. His feast day is celebrated in Brazil on October 5th, according to the rubrics of the Roman Missal translation by the Episcopal Conference of Brazil.

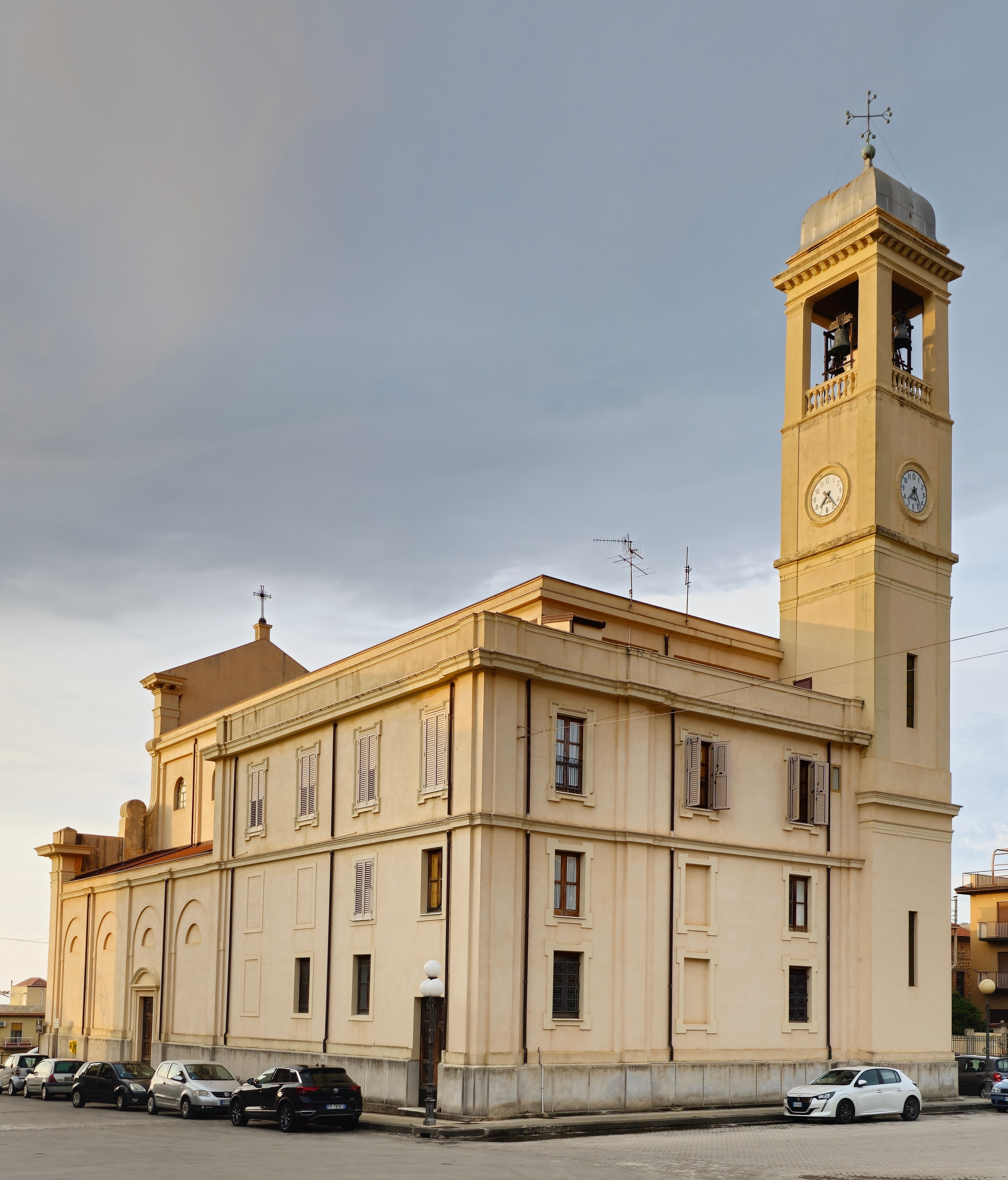
Acquedolci; Sicily Mother Church of the Blessed Virgin of the Assumption church with the statue of Saint Benedict the Moor

== See also ==
- List of Catholic saints
- Incorruptibility
