= Zingo Transportation =

Zingo Transportation was a company founded in October 2005 by Atlanta / Dallas - based entrepreneur, P. X. Head, and Nashville / Austin - based entrepreneur, P. Hutcheson Martin.

Zingo Transportation was a designated-driving service that uses the customer's own car to transport them to their home. Using a collapsible, folding motorbike made by Di Blasi, the driver places the motorbike in a bag in the trunk of the customers car, drives the customer to their destination, and then drives the motorbike to the next location.

Places that Zingo operated included Los Angeles, San Francisco, Atlanta, Nashville, Macon, Des Moines, Austin, Dallas, Charlotte, New Orleans, Phoenix, Tampa, and Melbourne.
