= San Gregorio Magno, Vizzini =

Baroque Roman Catholic church

Coordinates: 37.16110°N 14.74429°E

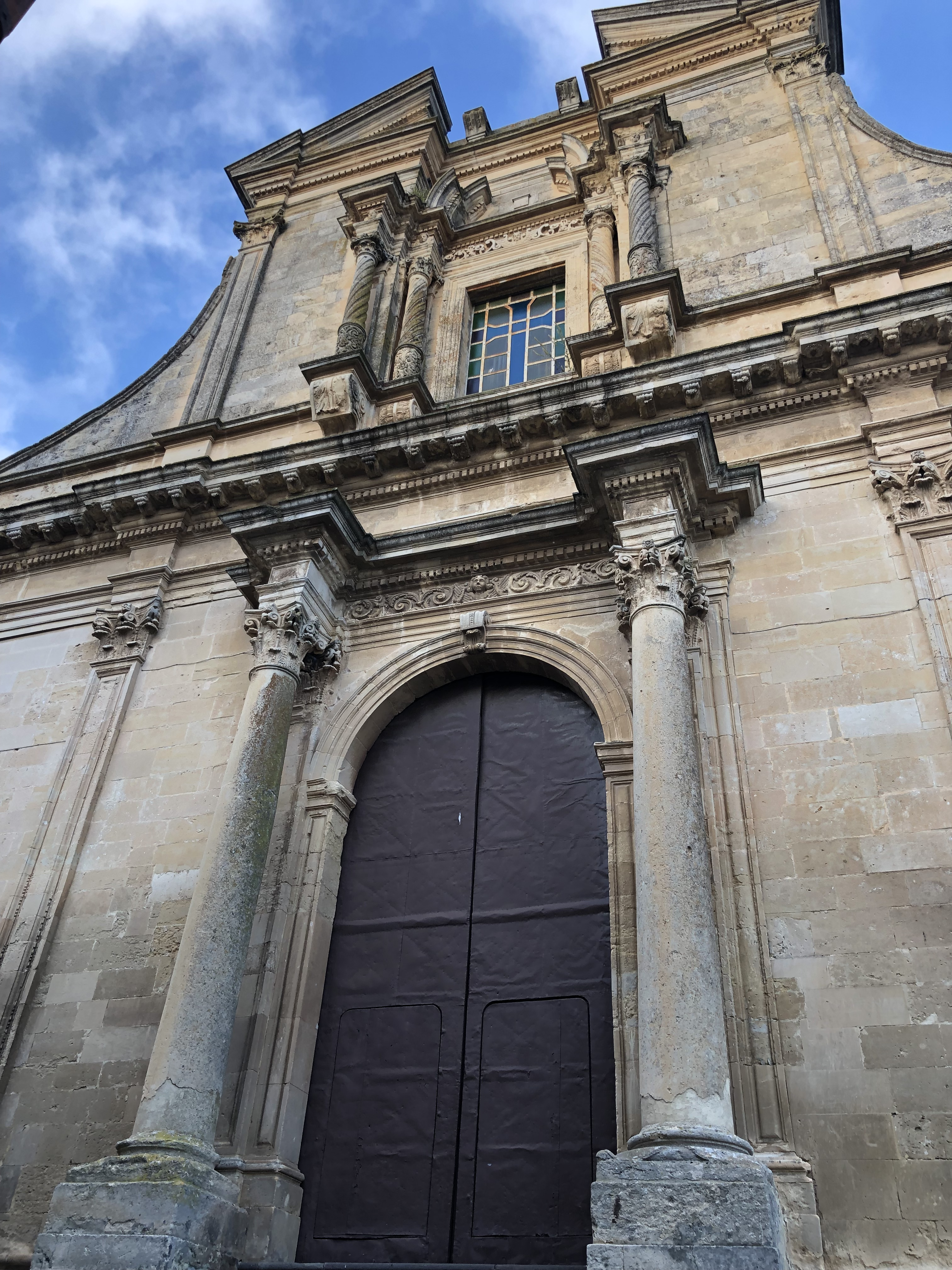
Baroque facade of church

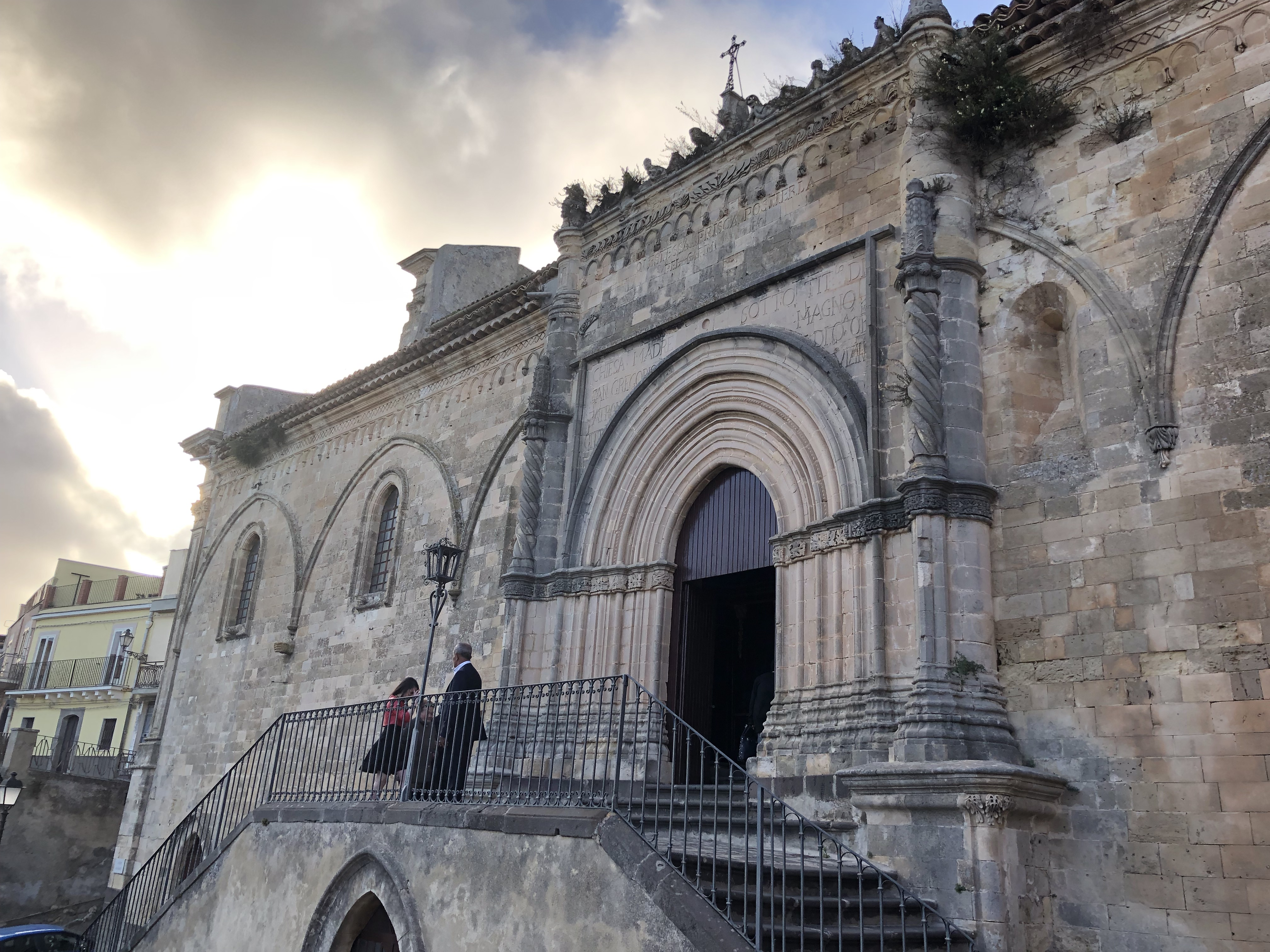
South flank of church with Gothic portal and windows

San Gregorio Magno is the Roman Catholic chiesa madre or mother church located on the corner of Via San Gregorio Magno and Largo Matrice, in the center of the town of Vizzini, in the region of Sicily, Italy. It rises near the basilica church of San Vito Martire.

== History and description ==
A church was likely present here in the prior to the 16th-century, associated with a Benedictine order convent, of which ruins can be found adjacent. However, like much of the town, the church was nearly razed by the 1693 Sicily earthquake, and rebuilt. On the flank of the church is a dramatic Gothic-style portal, accessed via wide dual staircases, with a 1539 inscription citing the town's titular patron of St Gregory (Pope Gregory I). This portal is rich in sculptural decoration, with reverberating pilasters and two solomonic columns. Along this side, there are gothic style windows under arched frames. The façade, however, was built in Baroque style with a broken tympanum and awkwardly protruding Corinthian columns. It is now lodged in a small alleyway, while the side entrance opens to the piazza. Diagonal to the façade in the piazza is a modern bronze statue of San Gregorio atop a graffiti-riddled column. A large bell-tower rises to the right of the apse.

The interior of the church houses various sculptural items and a rich stucco decoration. Among the altarpieces are a Martyrdom of the St Lawrence and a Madonna della Mercede by Filippo Paladino. There is a copy (1815-1819) of the Last Supper of Leonardo Da Vinci, painted by Giuseppe Emanuele Passanisi. There is also a 17th century depiction of Pope Gregory with Theodelinda. The wooden 17th-century icon of St Catherine derives originally from the church of that name in town. The depiction of Saint Silvia, mother of Gregory, was sculpted (1893) by Ortisei. The chapel of San Biagio (St Blaise) is richly decorated with polychrome marble, mainly from the 19th century. The church also has a prominent triptych, originally housed in the church of Saint Maria dei Greci.
