= Di Blasi Industriale =

Italian bicycle, tricycle, moped, and scooter manufacturer

Coordinates: 37.1979703°N 14.851316°E

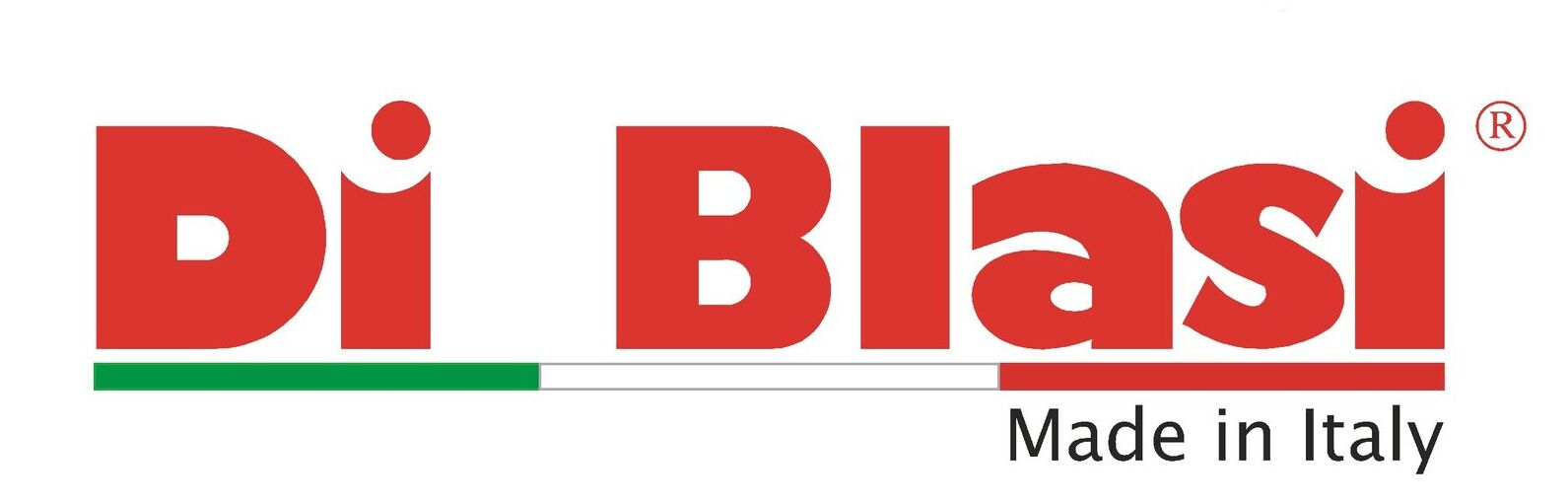
- Company type: Private
- Industry: Bicycles
- Founded: 1974; 52 years ago, Vizzini
- Founder: Rosario Di Blasi
- Headquarters: Vizzini, Italy
- Area served: Worldwide
- Products: folding bicycles, tricycles, mopeds and scooter
- Website: www.di-blasi.com

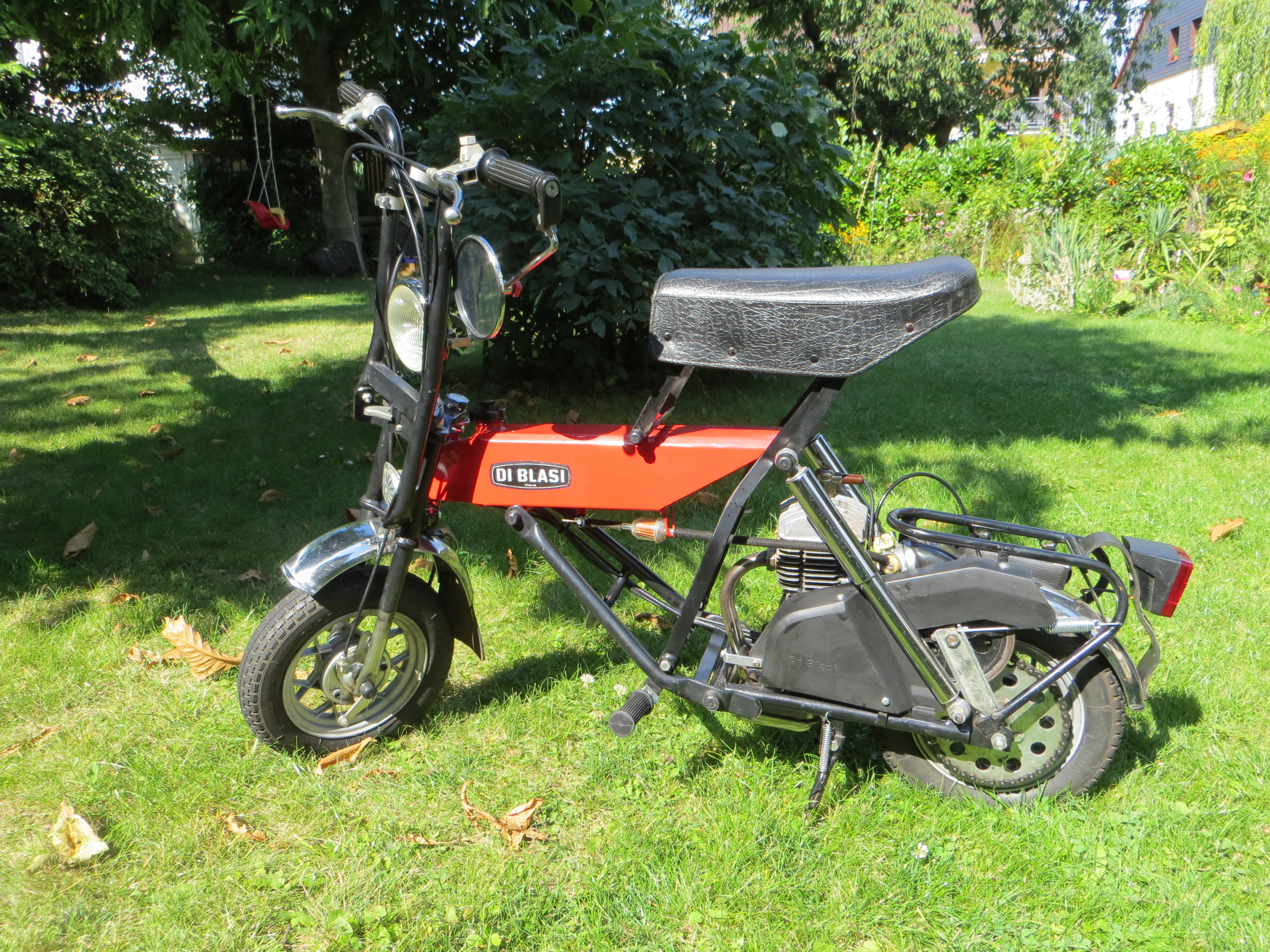
Di Blasi R7 (1982)

Di Blasi Industriale is an Italian manufacturer of folding bicycles, tricycles, mopeds, and scooters based in Vizzini, Sicily. The company's products are suitable for being transported by car, boat, or airplane, and are designed and manufactured entirely in-house.

== History ==
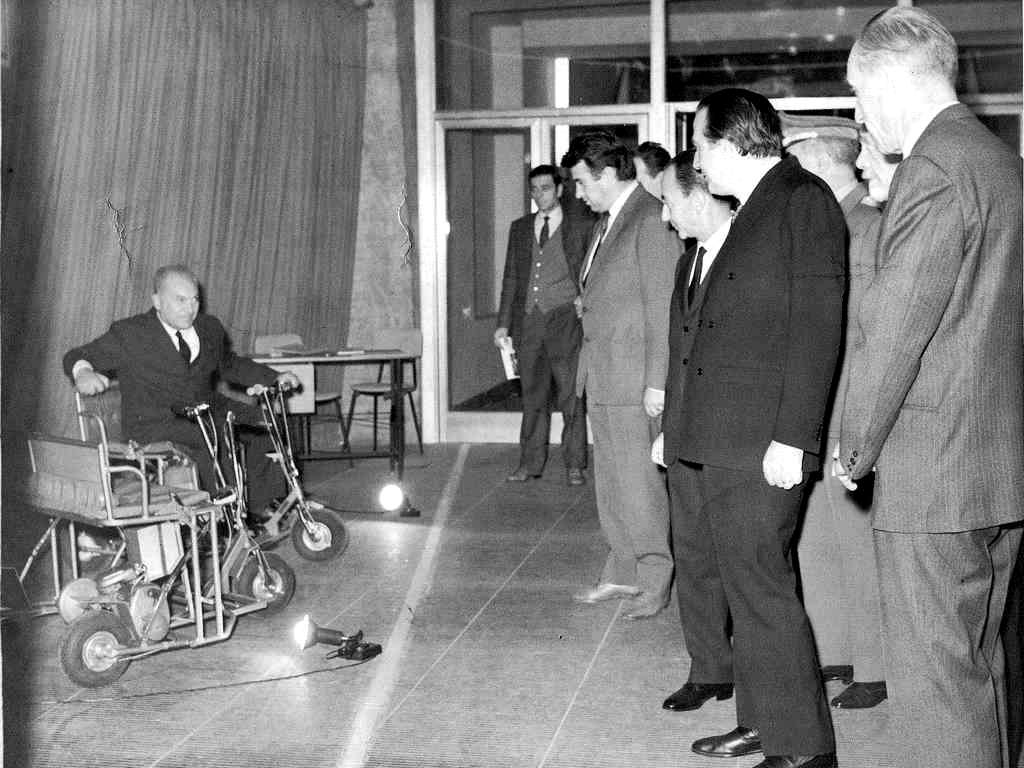
DIBLA7 at the 1968 Turin Auto Show

The founder of the company, Rosario Di Blasi, began development of a folding scooter in 1952, which by 1968 had evolved into a Zanetti-powered folding tricycle called the DIBLA 7 that was shown at the Turin Auto Show as a prototype. Finally in 1974 Di Blasi began production of a folding moped with a Franco Morini motor and single-speed transmission called the R2 (also known as the "Paperino"). In 1979 the model R7 replaced the R2 and featured an engine of Di Blasi's own design as well as a multi-speed transmission. This moped has been continuously improved and is still in production as the R7E. It has been used by the Polizia Stradale, the Traffic Police division of the Italian National Police, aboard their helicopters. The R7 is sold by Di Blasi of America as the "Express." It is also used worldwide by a number of different "chauffeur" companies, who will drive it to meet the customer, fold it up and put it in the trunk of their car, and drive the customer wherever they need to go, such as home from a bar or party. One such company, Superbob, serves part of the Netherlands. In the southern US, Zingo Transportation provides this service. In Australia the Di Blasi R7 has been imported, sold and run as part of their designated chauffeur service by Scoot2you Personal Chauffeurs originally on the Gold Coast and then in Brisbane and Melbourne and shortly in Sydney as part of their growing Franchise.

Also in 1974, the company introduced a folding bicycle called the Avia. The model Avia is notable for having featured the first folding pedals ever developed. The Avia evolved into the model R20 (1980), R50 (1984), R6 (1991), R4 (1995), R5, R21 (20-inch wheels), R24, and the R22. This bicycle series has characteristically been one of the most compact and easily folding bicycles on the market. The company has also been producing folding adult tricycles since 2000: the model R32 and the electric version mod. R34. Since 2012 Di Blasi has been producing a mobility electric scooter, mod. R30, that folds fully automatically at the press of a button. Target segment of the above vehicles are adults and people with minor mobility problems.

== See also ==
- List of bicycle parts
- List of Italian companies
