= San Vito, Vizzini =

Baroque Roman Catholic church

Coordinates: 37.16°N 14.75°E

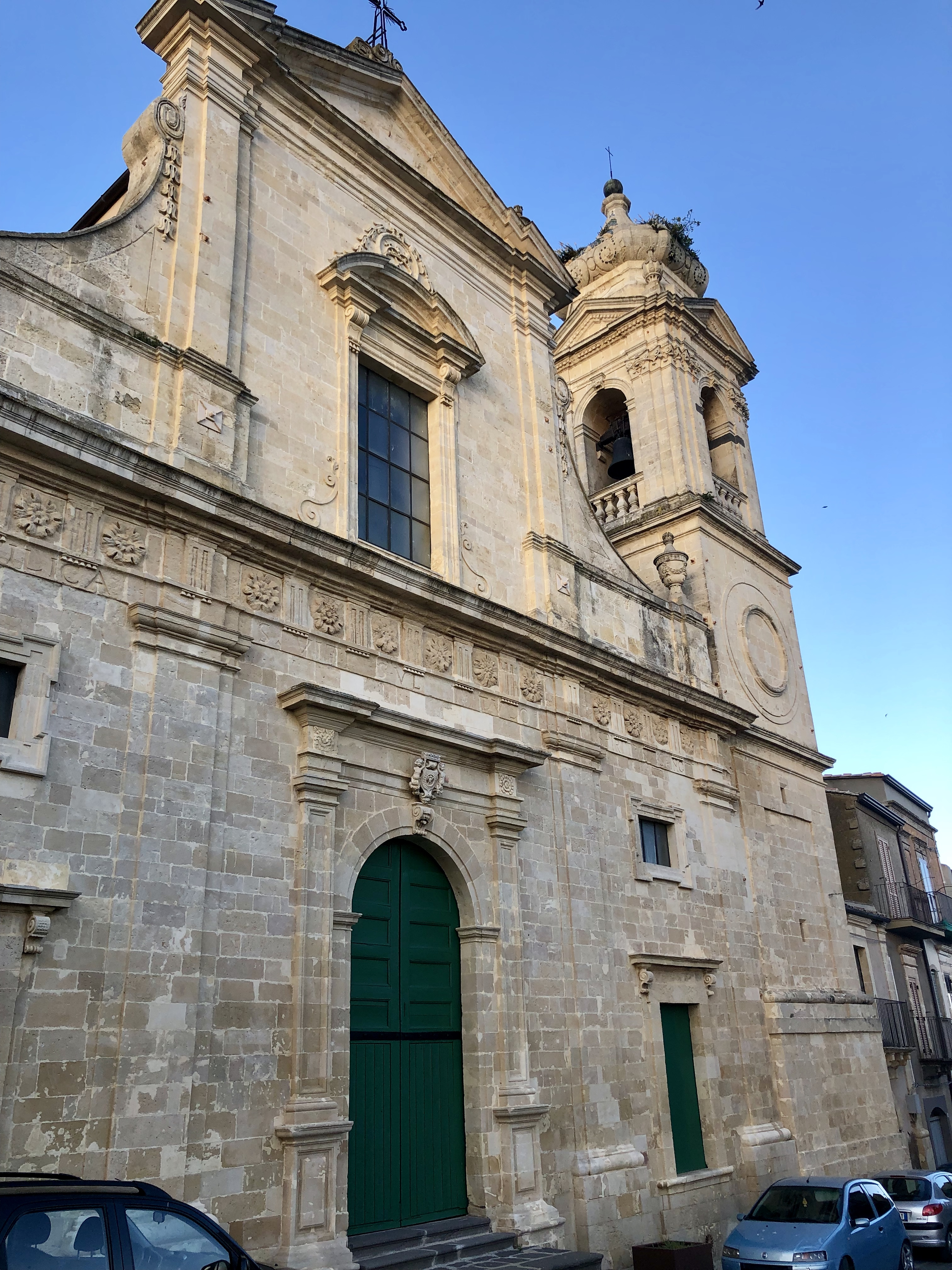
Facade of San Vito.

San Vito is a Roman Catholic basilica church located in Vizzini, in the region of Sicily, Italy.

== History and description ==
A place of worship at the site was present in the paleochristian era, aided by the presence of burial catacombs. Initially called the church of Spirito Santo (Holy Spirit). When the church was rebuilt, it incorporated also an oratory or church dedicated to San Vito. The interior contains an altar by the school of Antonello Gagini, and a 15th-century statue depicting St Michael Archangel. The facade has a decorative frieze and volutes linking to the aisles. The bell-tower has some moorish designs.
