= Jay Winsten =

American academic

- Education: Johns Hopkins University
- Scientific career
- Fields: Molecular biology
- Workplaces: Harvard University

Jay Winsten is an associate dean at the Harvard School of Public Health and the Director of the School's Frank Stanton Center for Health Communication. He is best known for his work in social marketing, spearheading high-profile national social campaigns on designated driving, youth violence, and youth mentoring. He also serves as Senior Communications Advisor to the United Nations Special Envoy for Malaria.

Trained as a molecular biologist, Winsten served as co-editor of the three-volume work, Origins of Human Cancer with Nobel laureate James Watson and Howard Hiatt, dean of the Harvard School of Public Health. Winsten's 1985 study, Science and the Media: The Boundaries of Truth, was praised by the Columbia Journalism Review as a "landmark study on the relationship between science and the press."

== Social campaigns ==
=== Designated drivers ===
As founding director of the Center for Health Communication, Winsten was the driving force behind the Harvard Alcohol Project, which introduced and popularized the social concept of the designated driver in the United States in the late 1980s, and is credited for contributing to lower rates of driving under the influence. The Harvard Alcohol Project solicited involvement from the broadcasting industry to spread the concept not only through public service announcements and news coverage, but through the inclusion of designated driving themes and references in popular television programs. The campaign is considered the first successful effort to mobilize the Hollywood creative community on a large scale to promote health messages, having facilitated use of the campaign theme in more than 160 prime time shows during the 1988-1992 television seasons. Sparking a national movement, with endorsements by renowned leaders in a broad range of professional fields, the strategy pioneered by the campaign was later emulated by other interest groups.

=== Youth violence ===
Following the success of the Harvard Alcohol Project, Winsten and colleagues used the same approach in a second social marketing initiative, The "Squash It!" Campaign to Prevent Youth Violence, launched in 1994. "Squash It!" centered around the use of the "squash it" phrase and an associated hand gesture to promote a social norm of walking away from potentially violent confrontations by framing it as "cool" and smart, rather than cowardly. The "Squash It!" meme was incorporated in a wide variety of television programs, films, and rap songs. The "squash" gesture, based on the time-out signal in sports, is performed by bringing the palm of a flat hand down onto a vertical clenched fist, forming a stylized "T". Though not considered as successful as the designated driver campaign, based on a national survey of junior and senior high school students, "Squash It!" was found to be particularly influential with African-Americans, its primary target group.

=== Youth mentoring ===
Winsten headed a communications task force which helped to plan the 1997 Presidents' Summit on America's Future in Philadelphia, chaired by General Colin Powell. As an outgrowth of the Summit, Winsten and colleagues began to shift focus to youth mentoring with the launch of the Harvard Mentoring Project, organizing a year-round national media campaign from 1998 to 2001 with support from the major broadcast television networks. In 2002, the campaign developed into National Mentoring Month, a focused campaign held each January to recruit volunteer mentors for at-risk youth. National Mentoring Month won the support of three successive U.S. presidents, Bill Clinton, George W. Bush, and Barack Obama, helping to establish mentoring as an important national priority.
