= San Sebastiano, Vizzini =

Baroque Roman Catholic church

Coordinates: 37.16°N 14.75°E

San Sebastiano is a Roman Catholic church located in Vizzini, in the region of Sicily, Italy.

== History and description ==
A church at the site was built in the 16th century, linked to an adjacent Benedictine convent of nuns. Destroyed by the 1693 Sicily earthquake, it was rebuilt in the early 18th century in a Baroque style. The church has a single nave with an interior rich in stucco and fresco decorations. On the walls, the Via Crucis is decorated in local maiolica from Caltagirone. The church is notable for having inspired the author Giovanni Verga to write his romance Storia di una capinera. The story is putatively based on a young Verga's infatuation with a nun from the convent.
