= Giardino Pacini =

Garden in Catania, Sicily

Coordinates: 37.50116°N 15.08776°E

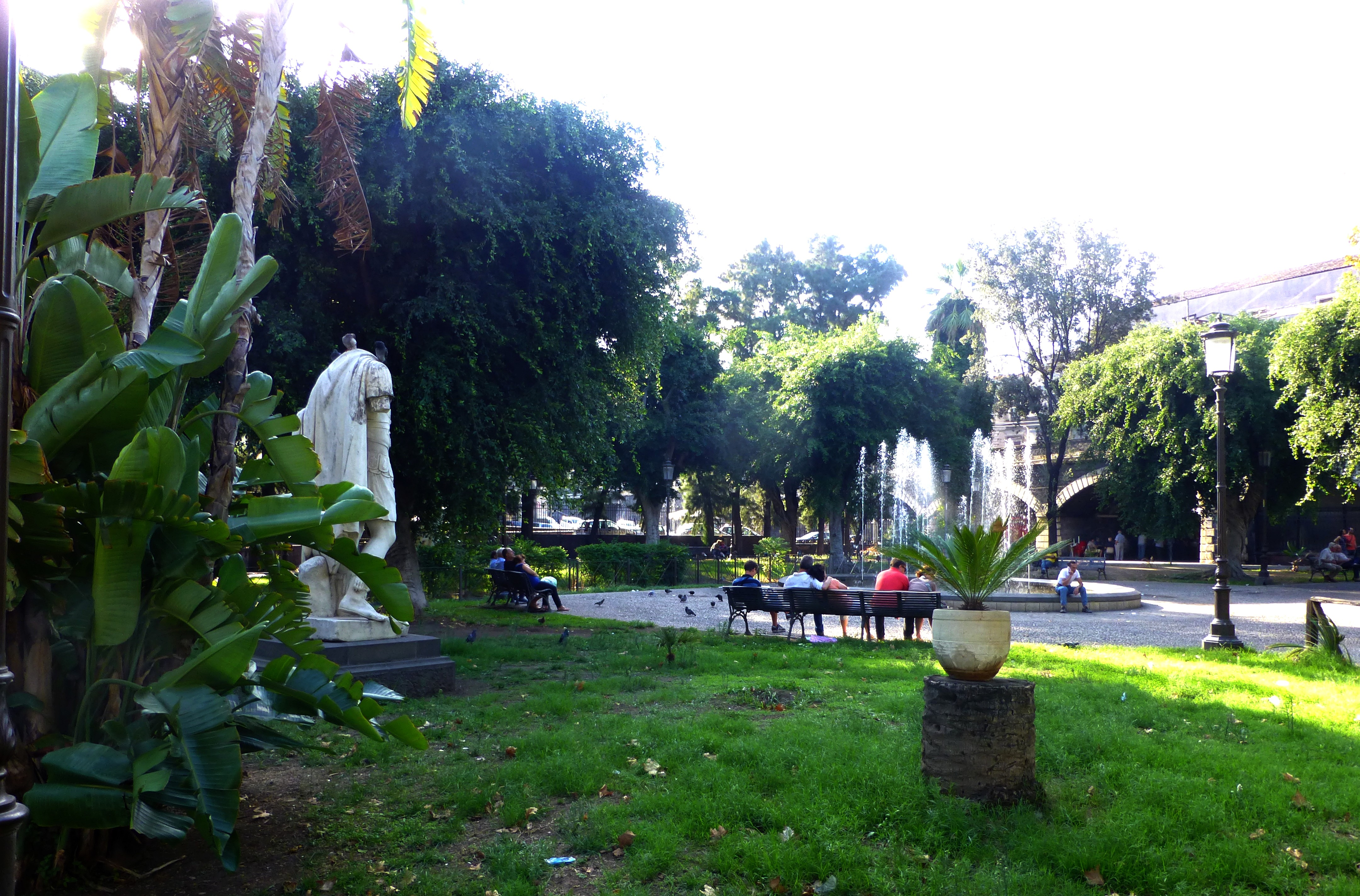
Giardino Pacini

The Giardino Pacini (English translation: "Pacini Garden"), also known as Villa Pacini or the Villa Varagghi, is a small circular urban park located just south of the Porta Uzeda, on the seaward side of the elevated railway viaduct, in Catania, region of Sicily, Italy. It is partially encircled by Via Lavandaie and Via Jonica.

== Description ==
The park, with a small central fountain, originally the Villa della Marina, was dedicated in 1978 to the memory of the opera composer Giovanni Pacini, and has a marble bust of the composer by Giovanni Dupré, as well as two headless statues of Bourbon kings of Naples. The River Amenano, now subterranean, once emptied into the sea at this point and the site was used by laundresses washing clothes (lavandaie). The garden was once part of a seaside park, but is now distant from the water.

== See also ==
- Giardino Bellini
