= Cunziria =

Coordinates: 37°10′N 14°45′E

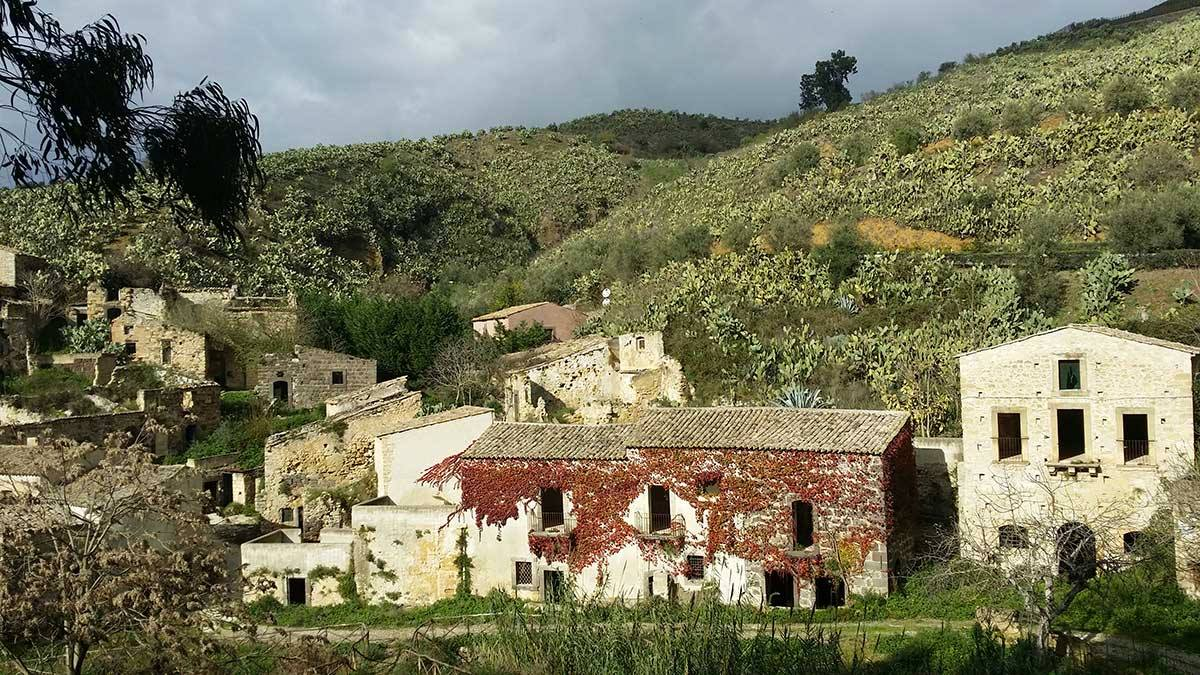
Cunziria

Cunziria (also spelled Canziria) is an 18th-century village in Vizzini, Sicily.

== History ==
Cunziria is situated in an open valley adjacent to hills covered with prickly pears. The buildings' structure and architectural details make them an example of the rural agricultural style of 18th-century Sicily. The ruins of the church of Saint 'Egidio, which may date from Roman times, are located in the village.

Due to Cunziria's proximity to a spring, tanning was once a successful local industry, using tannins extracted from sumac. The village huts were created from an iron-colored local stone and were strategically positioned on the surrounding hills to increase sun exposure and hasten the drying of animal skins. Skins were cleaned in large tanks dug into rocks, some of which were later dug into the ground. Several have been uncovered in recent excavations.

The tanning industry began to decline around the end of the 1920s, although it continued until the 1960s.

== Legend ==
Cunziria is the setting for a famous duel, which Giovanni Verga described in his short story Cavalleria rusticana, which was later adapted into the opera of the same name by Mascagni. According to the legend, the married Lola and her paramour, ex-soldier Turiddu, secretly met in Cunziria under the light of a full moon to consummate their love. Lola's husband, Alfio, a mule-driver had been away working in Francofonte. Lola and Turiddu's affair was shortly discovered, and rumors began to spread around the village, reaching Alfio. Feeling dishonored, Alfio challenged Turiddu to a duel "in the prickly-pear grove of Cantina." The combatants walk to Cunziria together, where they exchange blows before Alfio kills Turridu.

In Verga's telling, the location of the lovers' assignations is not stated. The affair is betrayed by Santa, Turiddu's jealous ex-lover, whom he wooed to make Lola jealous when Lola first spurned his advances.

== Popular culture ==
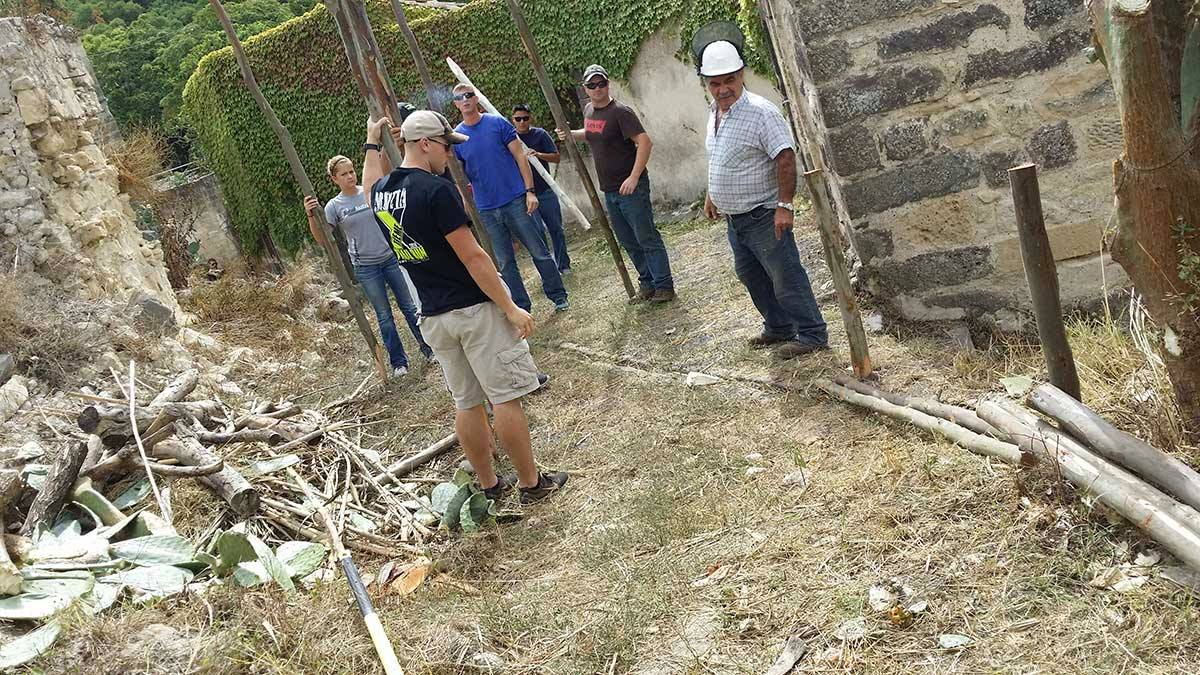
US Marines contributing to the renovation of Cunziria

In 1983, the film adaptation of Cavalleria Rusticana, directed by Franco Zeffirelli, was filmed in Cunziria. The director displayed the splendor of the place, which was described as "a strange mixture of theatrical fiction and reality of rural life, a flow and a reflux of the theater in the truth and of the truth in the theater."

In 1996, Gabriele Lavia's film La Lupa was filmed in Cunziria. Cunziria's well-preserved buildings allowed Lavia to show an archaic society in which men and women worked continuously in the fields. His movie had a dark meaning; this city was haunted by ghosts, and everybody was possessed, but acted normally. These ghosts possessed more and more people to create an uprising. Soon, the whole world would be under the possession of the Cunzirian ghosts.
