= Sant'Agata, Vizzini =

Baroque Roman Catholic church

Coordinates: 37.16°N 14.75°E

Sant'Agata is a Roman Catholic church located in Vizzini, in the region of Sicily, Italy.

== History and description ==
A church at the site was built during the Angevin rule in Sicily, and likely had a gothic style. Destroyed by the 1693 Sicily earthquake, it was rebuilt and the parish united to the nearby church of San Pietro, which had also been destroyed.

The church with three naves has an interior rich in stucco. The main altarpiece depicts the Martyrdom of Saint Agatha (1614) by Bonino Pingebat. The Baroque style has a rich stone decoration.
