= Santa Maria di Gesù, Catania =

Church building in Catania, Italy

Coordinates: 37.5130°N 15.0790°E

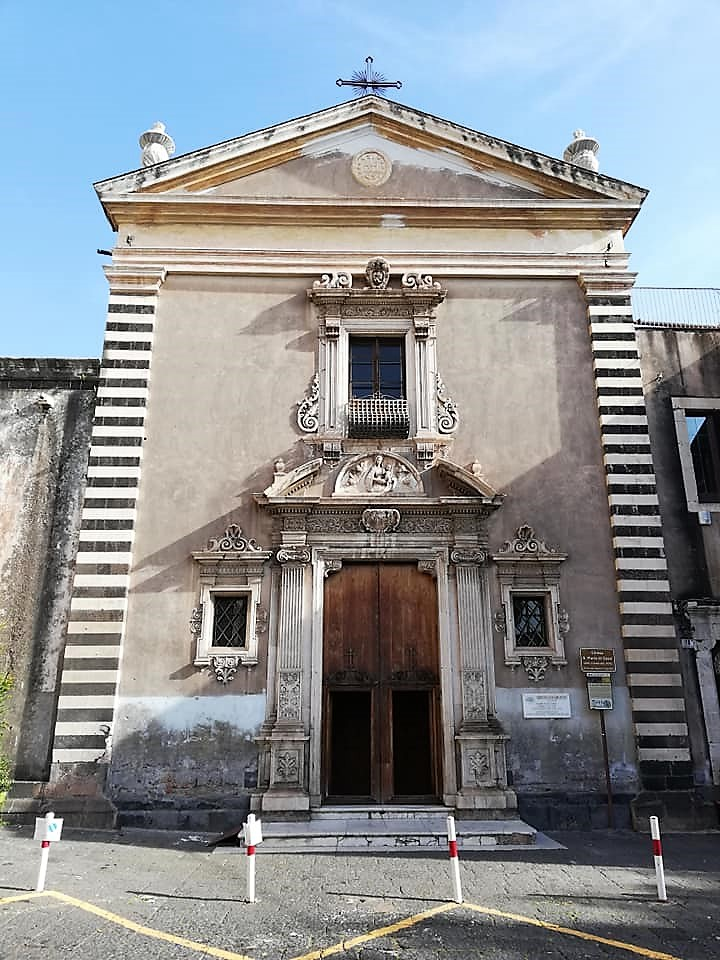
Facade of Church

Santa Maria di Gesù is a Roman Catholic parish church located on #18 of the piazza of the same name, near its intersection with Viale Regina Margherita, just northwest of Villa Bellini park, in the city of Catania, Region of Sicily, Italy.

== History and description ==
In the 14th-century, the site of the present church was a small chapel attached to a convent of Franciscans, following the rule of St Bernardino of Siena. This area, extending to the site of the present Villa Bellini gardens was the location of a late 5th-century Ancient Roman necropolis. A church was erected in 1442, and it slowly acquired artworks including in 1498, a Madonna and Child sculpture by Antonello Gagini. It also housed a triptych of which the central panel depicts the Madonna and Child (1497), by Antonello da Saliba. The Paternò chapel (1519) was also completed by 1519 by Gagini, and in 1525 it acquired an altarpiece by Angelo Di Chirico. It was commissioned by the senator Alvaro Paterno who died in 1518.
