= Designated driver =

Person who by agreement stays sober in order to drive a vehicle for non-sober persons

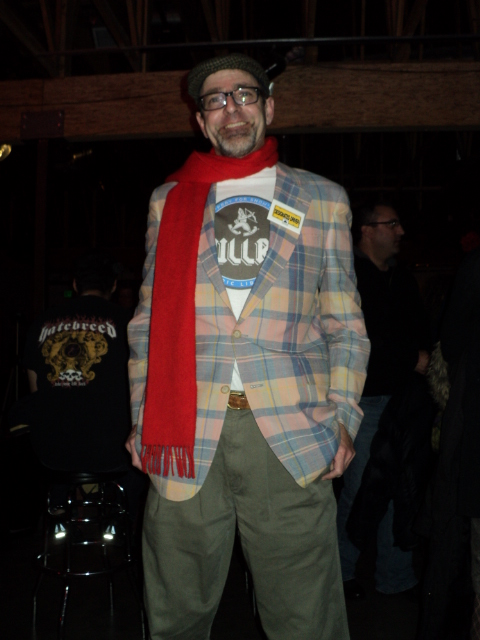
A designated driver on New Year's Eve 2011, United States; the yellow DD badge is courtesy of State Farm Insurance.

The terms "designated driver" and "designated driving" (commonly known as DD) refer to the selection of a person who remains sober as the responsible driver of a vehicle whilst others have been allowed to drink alcoholic beverages.

Thus, as a practical and ethical matter a designated driver is a person who abstains from alcohol on an occasion in order to drive their companions home safely as an alternative to driving under the influence. In order to encourage these arrangements, some bar, restaurant and nightclub proprietors will offer free or reduced-price soft drinks to designated drivers.

== History ==
The designated driver concept was developed in Scandinavia over several decades beginning in the 1920s, leading to a formalized designated driver program in the 1980s. The program was introduced in Canada in 1986 by Hiram Walker and Sons as "The Canadian Club Designated Driver Program". The program was accepted readily and supported by the police, Mothers Against Drunk Driving, the hospitality industry and the public. There were few if any detractors. The program was heavily promoted by Hiram Walker's president Doug Young and the company's PR agency Marshall Fenn Limited led by David Butler. The concept swept Canada, the United States and many other countries during 1986.

The concept was imported to the United States on a large scale in 1988 through the Harvard Alcohol Project, an initiative by the Harvard School of Public Health's Center for Health Communication, led by Jay Winsten. With heavy involvement by television networks and Hollywood studios, the campaign popularized the concept through public service announcements, as well as the encouragement of drunk driving prevention messages and designated driver references in popular television programs, such as Cheers, L.A. Law, and The Cosby Show. The U.S. Department of Transportation used public affairs commercials with the phrase "friends don't let friends drive drunk".

President Bill Clinton participated in the designated driver campaign throughout his presidency, taping public service announcements each year at the request of the Harvard Alcohol Project. With the endorsement of a broad range of individuals and organizations, designated driving became a national movement, with "designated driver" becoming a common phrase. Based on several polls indicating an increase in designated driving practices since the start of the initiative, the campaign is credited as a contributing factor to the decline in alcohol-related traffic fatalities between 1988 and 1994.

Since 2005, the spirits company Diageo has used a similar concept in Brazil to discourage drunk driving. Called Piloto da Vez, the campaign was born with the sponsorship of McLaren. Juan Pablo Montoya, Mika Häkkinen and Lewis Hamilton have participated in the campaign.

== Impediments ==
Though designated drivers are popular, groups often fail to use them properly. Often, there is a failure of those groups to designate the driver prior to making travel arrangements and arrive in separate vehicles. Even when a group does share a vehicle, it is not always the case that the designated driver remains sober. Failures to require driver abstinence or limitation of consumption is another problem. One study conducted at the Tijuana/San Diego border found that by asking groups intent on drinking to identify the designated driver prior to entering the bar district, the driver later returned with substantially lower BACs compared with the control groups.

== Advocacy groups ==
Various college and high school organizations, such as RamRide at Colorado State University in Fort Collins, Colorado, CARPOOL at Texas A&M University in College Station, Texas, Drive Safe Kalamazoo at Western Michigan University, and BUSY at Gulfport High School in Gulfport, Mississippi, offer to give free rides home on weekend nights to fellow students.

== Businesses ==
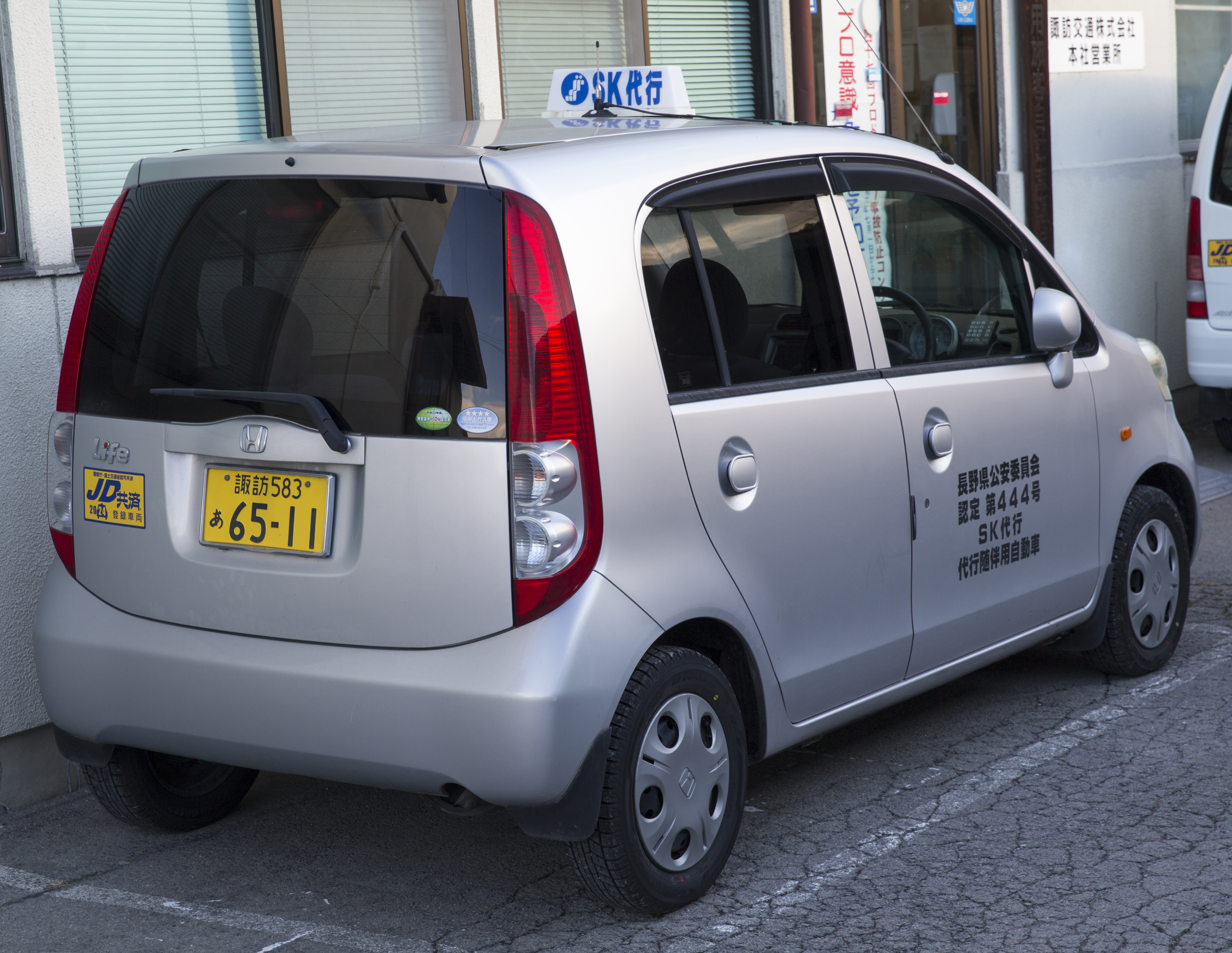
Car belonging to a licensed Japanese designated driver service (operated by a taxi company)

=== United States ===
Numerous businesses have sprouted up across the United States to help address the problem of drinking and driving. Some transport their drivers home, as passengers, using one of three methods: car, collapsible scooter, or foldable bike. These are not necessarily true designated driver programs, but instead Safe Ride programs, as the sober driver is not designated from within the natural drinking group. Designated Drivers, Inc, was founded in 1998 and was later based out of Las Vegas, NV. This company has used two person teams: one person to drive the impaired individual in their own vehicle, and the other person as the follow driver. Pittsburgh's Pear Transportation Company, aka The Pear Cares, has also become well known for using the two-person team approach. Dryver, formerly known as BeMyDD, established itself by offering designated driver services for events, car pickups for drivers who are too impaired to make it home, and personal drivers for evenings out. NightRiders, Incorporated was the first company to use collapsible, motorized scooters in the US. The drivers drove customers home using their own vehicles, stowing a scooter in the customer's trunk (or truck). Upon arrival to the customer's destination, the driver parked the vehicle, collected the fare, and rode off to the next customer on the scooter. This company is now out of business, according to their website. Zingo Transportation has operated this kind of service in southern US cities since 2005.

=== South Korea ===
Designated driver services in South Korea are widely prevalent and in high demand, especially in major cities such as Seoul and Busan. Designated driver call centers operate as a central dispatch with some vendors providing mobile apps to request a driver. The driver arrives at the location of the customer's vehicle and will drive it to the requested location for a fee. The Korean language word for these designated drivers for hire is 'dae-ri un-jeon' (대리운전) meaning replacement driver. According to the Korea Service Driver Society, an estimated 100,000 replacement drivers handle 700,000 customers a day across the country (2007)

=== Australia ===
Designated driver services in Australia exist in many capital cities and regional towns. The service is in high demand due to highly regulated, unreliable taxi services.

=== New Zealand ===
In 2017, Coca-Cola announced a promotion to encourage people to have sober drivers by offering free Coca-Cola.

=== Canada ===
==== Ontario ====
Canada has a long history with designated driver services provided by private enterprise going back to 1996 in Ontario. One of central Ontario's largest designated driver services, Barrie Designated Drivers, has transported thousands of clients home over the years with multiple offices in Ontario Canada.

==== British Columbia ====
B.C. hosts a substantial market for designated driver services. Firms operate all week, transporting people home in their own cars for a charge.

=== China ===
In China, dàijià (代驾) apps, such as E-Daijia and Didi Daijia, allow a customer to hire a driver to drive them home in the customer's own car. This service's popularity is driven by high population density and low cost. The service is used by customers who have been drinking or who want to work on the way instead of focusing on driving. Drivers put an e-bike in the trunk of the car and ride it away after dropping off the customer and the car.

Hong Kong Designated Driver Limited (HKDD) or easydrive also helps individuals to safely get home in their own cars. HKDD provides Android and iOS mobile apps for their users.
