= Francesco Minà Palumbo =

Italian naturalist

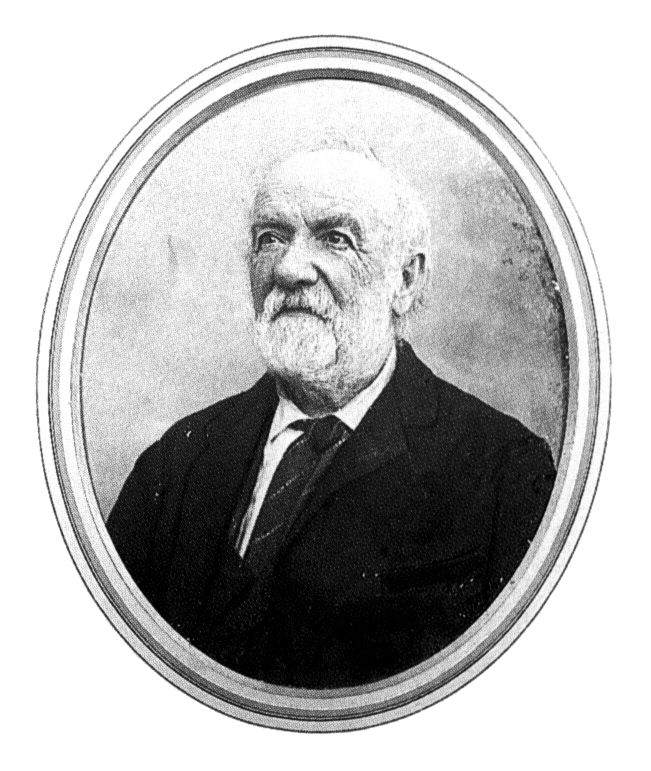
Portrait

Francesco Minà-Palumbo (14 March 1814 in Castelbuono – 12 March 1899) was an Italian naturalist who made the first significant studies of the natural history of Sicily. Palumbo graduated in medicine at the Palermitano Athenaeum. He then continued his studies in Naples. He returned to Castelbuono both a medical doctor and a professional agronomist and began, in his spare time, the systematic exploration of Madonie it:Madonie making collections and finding and documenting the geology, hydrology, climate, botany, and zoology of the region. This culminated in 1844 with his first published work, Introduzione alla Storia Naturale delle Madonie (Introduction to the Natural History of Madonie).

Minà-Palumbo wrote 402 articles on natural history, medicine, and general subjects relating to the Madonita territory. The most important are the Il Catalogo dei Mammiferi della Sicilia (Catalogue of the Mammals of Sicily) (1868 ), Materiali per la fauna lepitterologica della Sicilia (Material for the Lepidoptera fauna of Sicily) (1899) written in collaboration with his student Luigi Failla Tedaldi, and Proverbi Agrarj (1853–55) in Annali di Agricoltura. His herbarium, zoological and entomological collections and documents are in Museo naturalistico Francesco Minà Palumbo in Castelbuono.
