= Filippo Paladino =

Italian painter

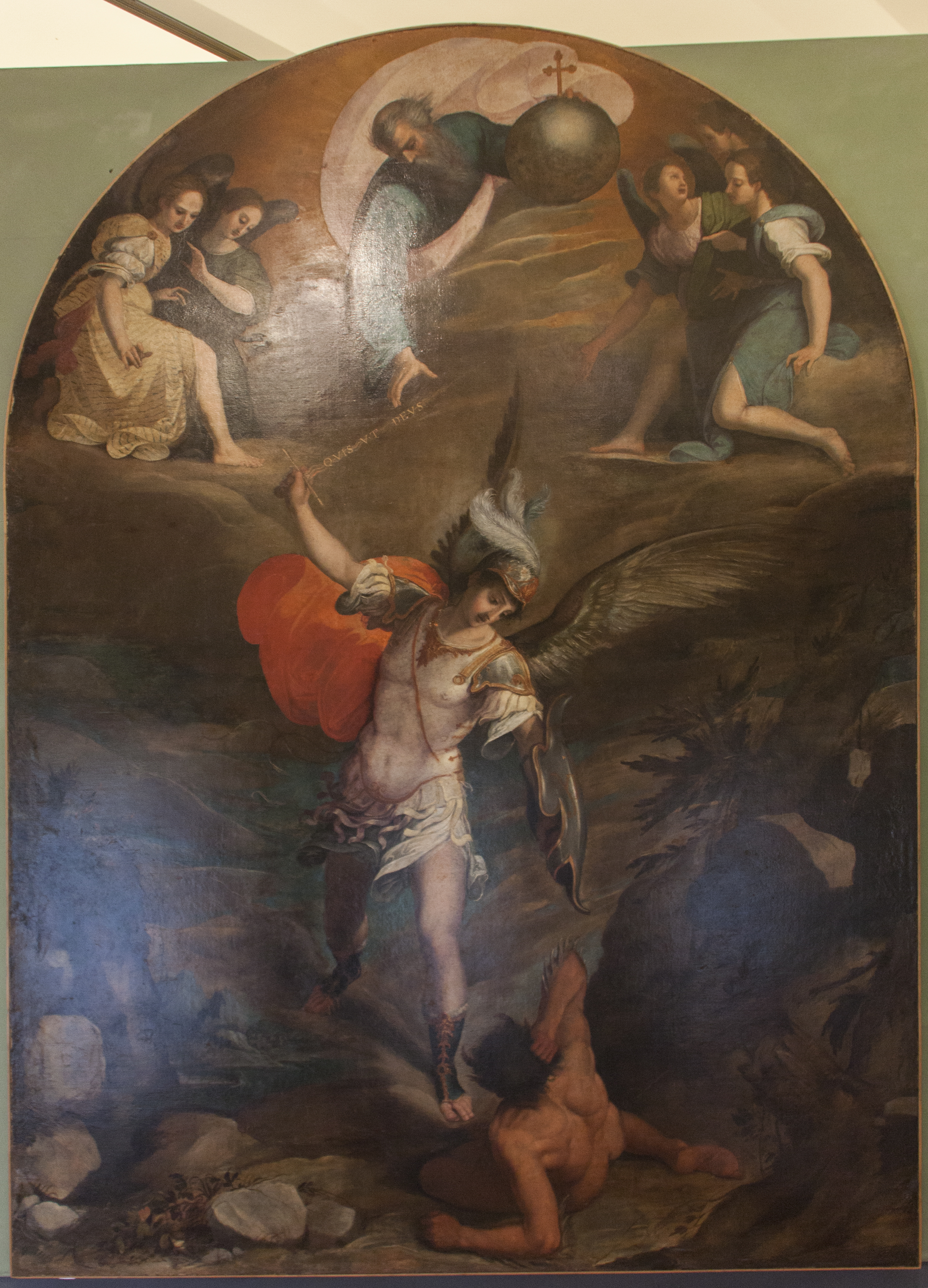
San Michele Arcangelo, Galleria regionale di «Palazzo Abatellis»

Filippo Paladino (1544–1614) was an Italian painter.

== Biography ==
He was born near Florence, in Tuscany, and remained there until c. 1586, when he was imprisoned and subsequently exiled to Malta. From there he moved to Sicily, where he was active the rest of his life. He painted an altarpiece for the church of Sant'Ignazio all'Olivella, two altarpieces for the church of San Gregorio Magno, Vizzini, and two altarpieces for the church of San Giorgio dei Genovesi, Palermo.
