= Matteo Agosta =

Italian politician (1922–1964)

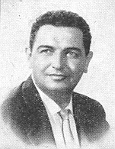
Matteo Agosta

Matteo Agosta (18 January 1922 – 18 May 1964) was an Italian politician.

Had a degree in law and philosophy; lawyer.

Agosta was born in Vizzini. He represented the Christian Democracy party in the Chamber of Deputies from 1958 to 1964.
