= French submarine Agosta =

French submarine Agosta may refer to more than one submarine of the French Navy:

- Agosta (Q178), a Redoutable-class submarine commissioned in 1937 and scuttled in 1940
- Agosta (S620), an Agosta-class submarine in commission from 1977 to 1997

== See also ==
- Agosta-class submarine
