= Santa Maria di Gesù, Vizzini =

Baroque Roman Catholic church

Coordinates: 37.16218°N 14.75455°E

Santa Maria di Gesù is a Roman Catholic church and convent located along Viale Regina Margherita, on Piazza Guglielmo Marconi #10, in Vizzini, in the region of Sicily, Italy.

== History and description ==
A church at the site was present likely since the 13th-century, but the present late-Baroque style church was rebuilt after the 1693 Sicily earthquake. The facade has a nearly neoclassical sobriety, with four giant-order corinthian pilasters, and a clock in the tympanum. It has a single nave with two chapels. Alongside the church was rebuilt the convent of the Order of Friars Minor, the Franciscan order attached to the church. The convent was suppressed in 1866, and has been put through various uses, although a fraction still is owned by the friars.

Inside the church is a marble statue depicting the Madonna (1527) by Antonio Gagini. There are altarpieces depicting Santa Chiara and Santa Filomena by the local painter P. Formica; and an Immaculate heart of Mary (1866) by Francesco Vaccaro.
