= Santa Maria di Gesù al Capo =

Baroque Catholic parish church in Palermo, Italy

- Chiesa di Santa Maria di Gesù al Capo (in Italian)
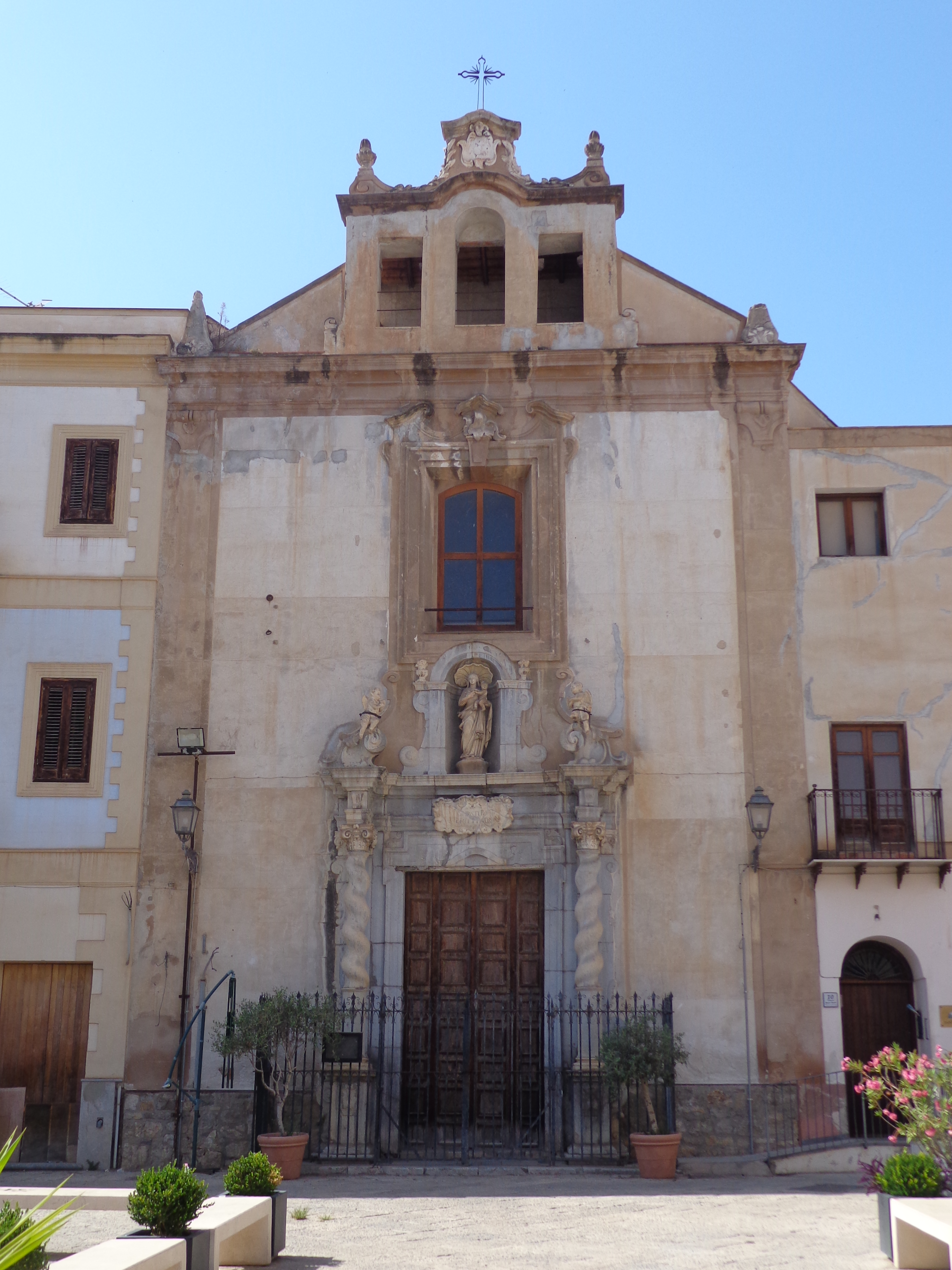
- Facade

Religion
- Affiliation: Roman Catholic
- Province: Archdiocese of Palermo
- Rite: Roman Rite

Location
- Location: Palermo, Italy
- Interactive map of Santa Maria di Gesù al Capo
- Coordinates: 38.11681°N 13.35543°E

Santa Maria di Gesù al Capo (Italian) is a Baroque Catholic parish church in the Palermo region of Sicily, Italy. It faces the Beati Paoli plaza in the Capo quarter.

== History ==
Historical documents first mention the church in 1489. It had been built adjacent to a Church of San Rocco, later Santi Cosma e Damiano.

Documents list the church as belonging to the Oratory of Saint Philip Neri, but by 1577, the church was affiliated with an order caring for orphan children. In 1648–49, it was granted to a congregation of Christian slaves, later to a confraternity ministering to porters conducting deliveries with animals. In recent time, it was administered by the Order of Friars Minor.

In 1660, the church was refurbished under the dedication of Santa Maria di Gesù, but was locally known as Santa Maruzza ri Canceddi. The facade and layout is simple. The nave ceiling has a fresco depicting Saint Zaccharias. Other frescoes depict events in the life of Mary.

== Convent of Santa Maria di Gesù ==
Some miles south of the church, at the foot of Mount Grifone, there is a homonymous convent of the Franciscan friars, built in 1426 by Blessed Matteo da Gimara. St. Benedict the Moor, the patron of Palermo, died there on April 4, 1589, and had spent the last part of his life as a hermit here. In the highest part of the locality, one can admire the tree of San Benedetto, with a majestic trunk of over 500 years of life, a cypress which, according to legend, the saint himself planted by driving a stick into the rocks.

The convent was significantly damaged during the 2023 Italy wildfires. The relics of St. Benedict the Moor, whose major shrine was located therein, were largely lost.
