= Acquedolci =

Acquedolci Acquaduci / Acquaruci (Sicilian)
- Comune
- Comune di Acquedolci
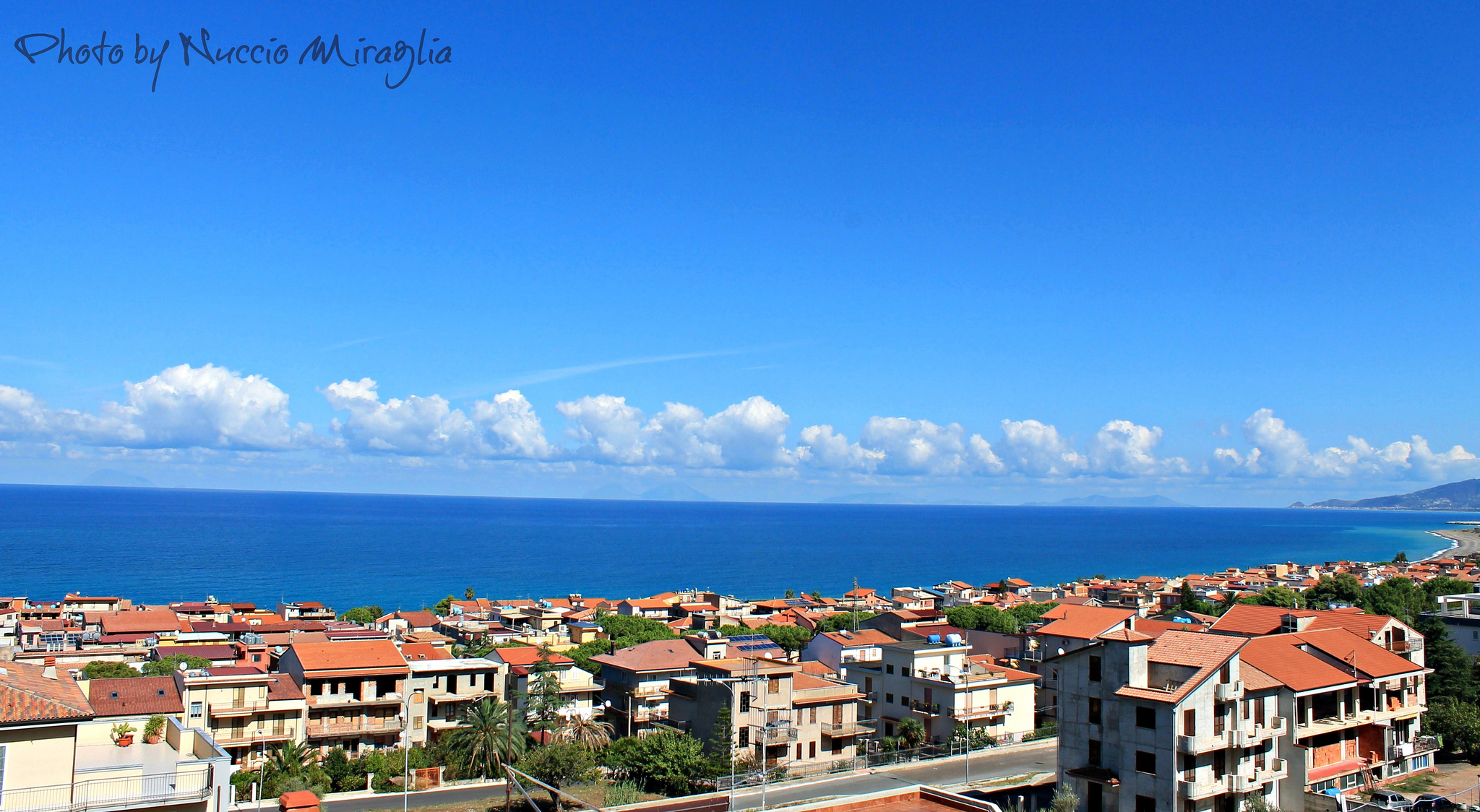

- Location of Acquedolci in Italy Acquedolci (Sicily)
- Coordinates: 38°3′N 14°35′E
- Country: Italy
- Region: Sicily
- Metropolitan city: Messina (ME)

Government
  - Mayor: Alvaro Riolo

Area
  - Total: 12 km^{2} (4.6 sq mi)
- Elevation: 15 m (49 ft)

Population (31 March 2016)
  - Total: 5,739
  - Density: 480/km^{2} (1,200/sq mi)
- Demonym: Acquedolcesi
- Time zone: UTC+1 (CET)
  - Summer (DST): UTC+2 (CEST)
- Postal code: 98070
- Dialing code: 0941
- Patron saint: St. Benedict the Moor
- Saint day: 4 April
- Website: www.comune.acquedolci.me.it

Acquedolci (Sicilian: Acquaduci) is an Italian town and comune in the Metropolitan City of Messina in Sicily.

Its name, that can be translated in English as "sweet waters", probably came from the fresh water springs which are part of the town territory. The inhabited centre was founded in 1922, following a landslide which damaged the town of San Fratello, forcing a large part of the population to relocate there. Acquedolci, which was a frazione of San Fratello, obtained comune status in 1969.

The history of Acquedolci has ancient origins that date back to Roman times. The name itself seems to derive from the fact that the ancient Romans, during the First Punic War, between 264 and 241 BC, identified an underwater spring off the coast that allowed them to supply water directly into the sea. During the Roman era, Acquedolci, crossed by the Consular Valeria, was a resting place where it was possible to change mules and exchange mail. The locality became part of the "Tavola Peutingeriana".
