= Giardino Bellini =

Urban park of Catania, Italy

Coordinates: 37.5110°N 15.0834°E

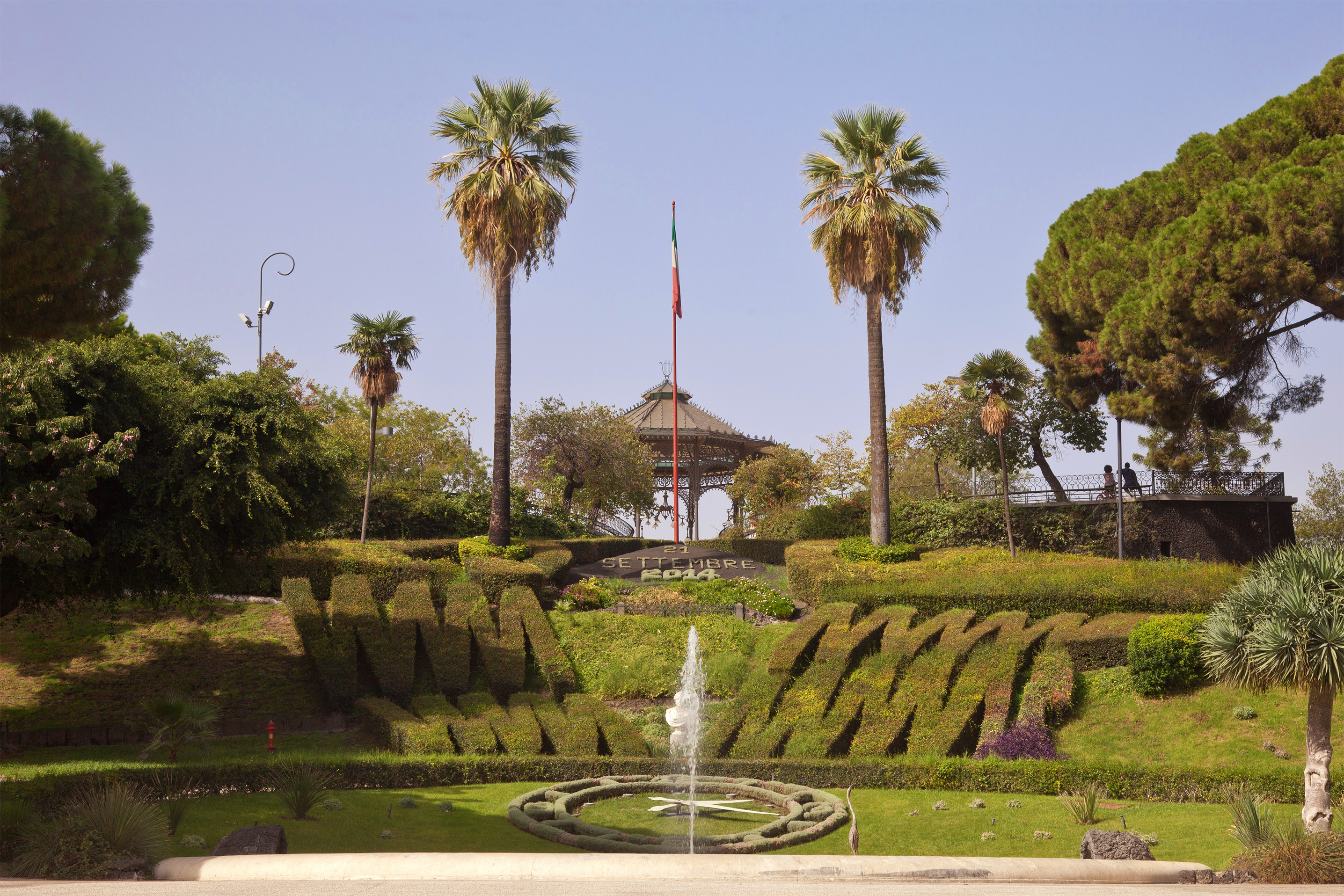
Landscape from the main entrance

The Giardino Bellini (English translation: "Bellini Garden", also known as Villa Bellini) is the oldest urban park of Catania.

It occupies 70.942 m².

== History ==
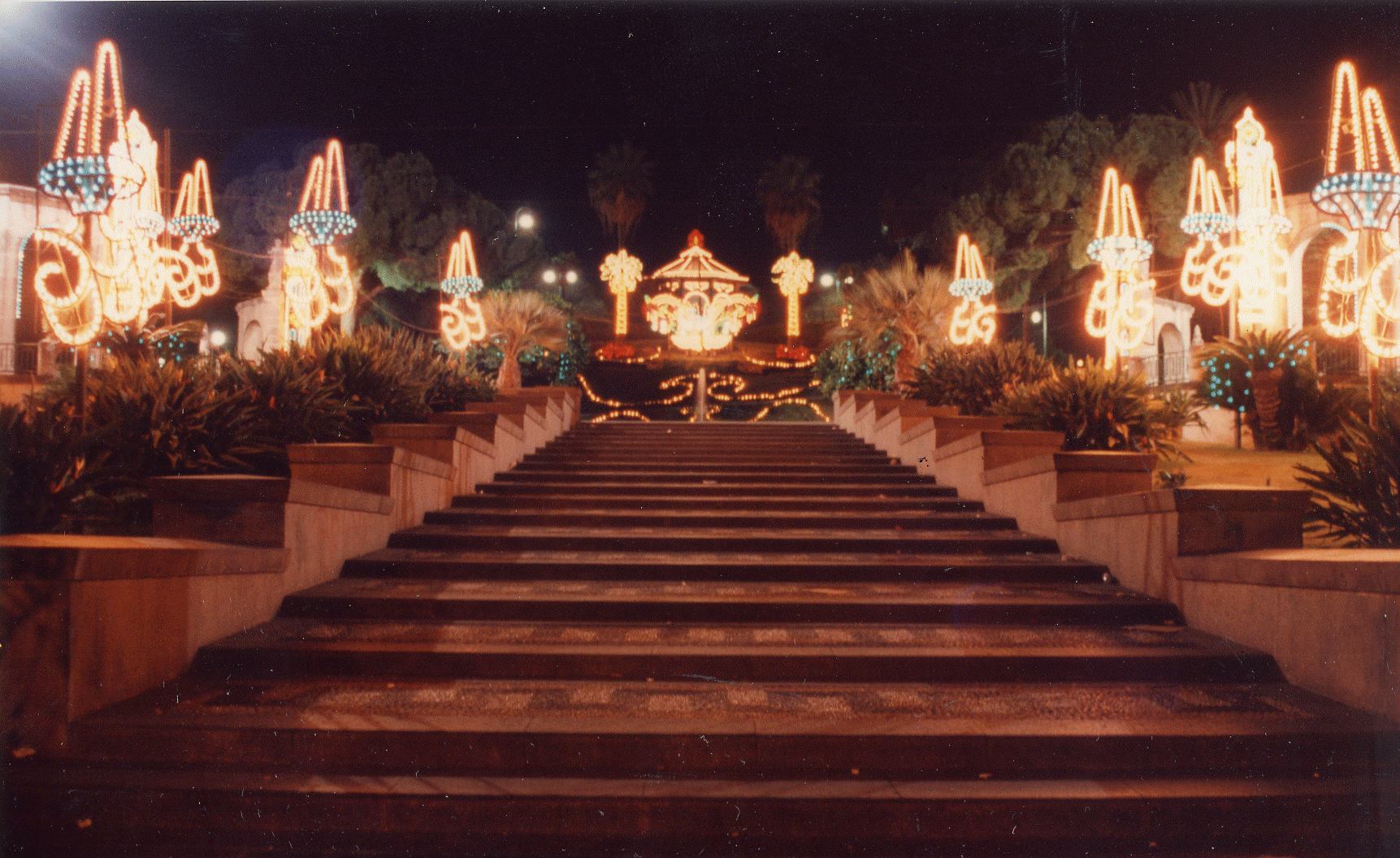
Main stairs during the Festival of Saint Agatha, 1993

Before the construction of a public garden, the area was occupied by the garden maze or labyrinth owned by the Ignazio Paternò Castello, prince of Biscari. In 1854, the Comune di Catania bought the area of the maze, and in 1864 started to adapt the area into a public garden. Starting from 1875, the municipality acquired several further areas surrounding the maze, and two years later the work to unify these areas was undertaken.

A guide from 1867 reports the gardens housed swan and geese, deer and cows, an aviary, and an enclosure of monkeys. The park has a white marble bust depicting Vincenzo Bellini and completed by Tito Angiolini.

The Giardino Bellini was finally inaugurated in 1883.

== See also ==
- Giardino Pacini
